= Mangelia pseudoattenuata =

Scientific classification
- Kingdom: Animalia
- Phylum: Mollusca
- Class: Gastropoda
- Subclass: Caenogastropoda
- Order: Neogastropoda
- Superfamily: Conoidea
- Family: Mangeliidae
- Genus: Mangelia
- Species: M. pseudoattenuata

Binomial name
- Mangelia pseudoattenuata Ardovin, 2004

Species of gastropod

Mangelia pseudoattenuata is a species of sea snail, a marine gastropod mollusk in the family Mangeliidae.

== Description ==
The length of the shell attains 5 mm.

== Distribution ==
This species occurs in the Atlantic Ocean off Senegal.
