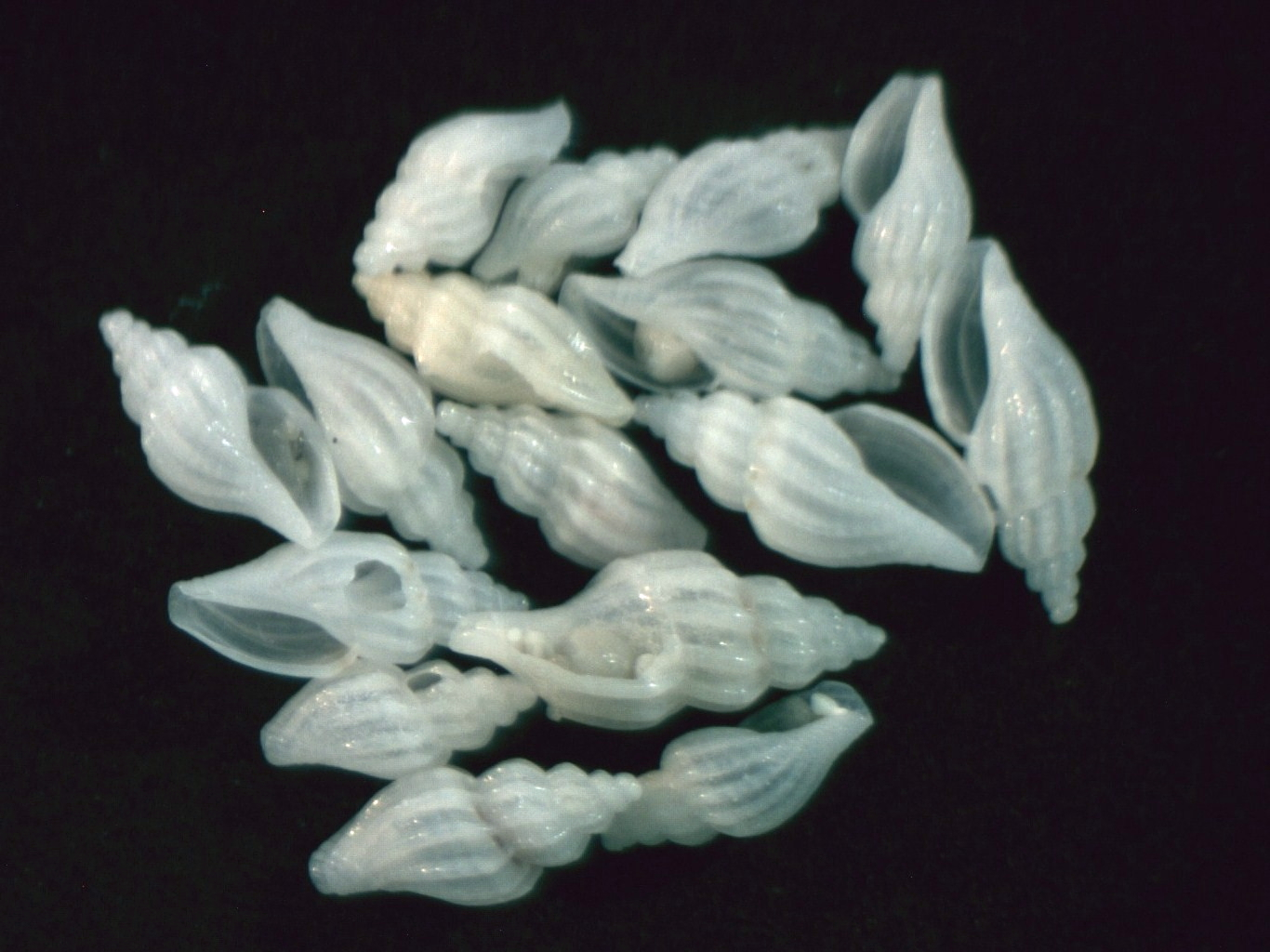
- Shells of Mangelia fieldeni

Scientific classification
- Kingdom: Animalia
- Phylum: Mollusca
- Class: Gastropoda
- Subclass: Caenogastropoda
- Order: Neogastropoda
- Superfamily: Conoidea
- Family: Mangeliidae
- Genus: Mangelia
- Species: M. fieldeni

Binomial name
- Mangelia fieldeni (van Aartsen & Fehr-de Wal, 1978)

Synonyms
- Mangiliella angelinae Cecalupo & Quadri, 1996; Mangiliella fieldeni Aartsen & Fehr-de Wal, 1978

= Mangelia fieldeni =

Species of gastropod

Mangelia fieldeni is a species of sea snail, a marine gastropod mollusk in the family Mangeliidae.

== Distribution ==
This species occurs in the Mediterranean Sea along Greece and Cyprus.
