= Mangelia theskeloides =

Scientific classification
- Kingdom: Animalia
- Phylum: Mollusca
- Class: Gastropoda
- Subclass: Caenogastropoda
- Order: Neogastropoda
- Superfamily: Conoidea
- Family: Mangeliidae
- Genus: Mangelia
- Species: M. theskeloides

Binomial name
- Mangelia theskeloides J.C. Melvill & R. Standen, 1899

Synonyms
- Mangilia theskeloides J.C. Melvill & R. Standen, 1901 (original combination)

Species of gastropod

Mangelia theskeloides is a species of sea snail, a marine gastropod mollusk in the family Mangeliidae.

== Description ==
The length of the shell attains 8 mm, its diameter 4 mm.

(Original description) The fusiform, somewhat solid shell becomes attenuate towards the apex. It contains seven whorls. The whorls of the protoconch are imperfect in all the examples examined. They are tinged with blackish brown. The subsequent whorls are turreted, tumid and brightly ochraceous. They are ornamented with strong longitudinal ribs, which number eleven on the body whorl. These are crossed by spiral close striae, which are not shown on elder worn specimens. The most conspicuous feature is a series of darker blackish-brown zones,.one just above the suture of each whorl and another in the centre of the lowest. These zones are interrupted and only appear between the ribs, the remainder of the surface being painted with light brown scattered dots and flames, a series of light spiral maculations just below the sutures being specially prominent. The aperture is narrow, oblong, the dark zone shows transversely across the interior. The outer lip is incrassate, sinus very obscure. The columella is straight and stained with brown at the base.

== Distribution ==
This marine species occurs off Karachi, Pakistan.
