= Mangelia ahuiri =

Scientific classification
- Kingdom: Animalia
- Phylum: Mollusca
- Class: Gastropoda
- Subclass: Caenogastropoda
- Order: Neogastropoda
- Superfamily: Conoidea
- Family: Mangeliidae
- Genus: Mangelia
- Species: M. ahuiri

Binomial name
- Mangelia ahuiri Cossignani & Ardovini, 2011

Species of gastropod

Mangelia ahuiri is a species of sea snail, a marine gastropod mollusc in the family Mangeliidae.

== Description ==
The length of the shell attains 8 mm.

== Distribution ==
This marine species occurs off the Western Sahara and Morocco.
