= Mangelia finterae =

Scientific classification
- Kingdom: Animalia
- Phylum: Mollusca
- Class: Gastropoda
- Subclass: Caenogastropoda
- Order: Neogastropoda
- Superfamily: Conoidea
- Family: Mangeliidae
- Genus: Mangelia
- Species: M. finterae

Binomial name
- Mangelia finterae Sowerby, G.B. III, 1894

Synonyms
- Mangilia finterae Sowerby, G.B. III, 1894

Species of gastropod

Mangelia finterae is a species of sea snail, a marine gastropod mollusk in the family Mangeliidae.

== Distribution ==
This marine species occurs off Mauritius
