= Mangelia hesperia =

Scientific classification
- Kingdom: Animalia
- Phylum: Mollusca
- Class: Gastropoda
- Subclass: Caenogastropoda
- Order: Neogastropoda
- Superfamily: Conoidea
- Family: Mangeliidae
- Genus: Mangelia
- Species: M. hesperia

Binomial name
- Mangelia hesperia H.A. Pilsbry & A.A. Olsson, 1941

Extinct species of gastropod

Mangelia hesperia is an extinct species of sea snail, a marine gastropod mollusc in the family Mangeliidae.

== Distribution ==
This extinct marine species was found in Pliocene strata of the Canoa Formation in Ecuador; age range: 5.332 to 2.588 Ma
