= Mangelia pontica =

Scientific classification
- Kingdom: Animalia
- Phylum: Mollusca
- Class: Gastropoda
- Subclass: Caenogastropoda
- Order: Neogastropoda
- Family: Mangeliidae
- Genus: Mangelia
- Species: M. pontica

Binomial name
- Mangelia pontica Milaschewitsch, 1908

Species of gastropod

Mangelia pontica is a species of sea snail, a marine gastropod mollusk in the family Mangeliidae.

== Distribution ==
This species occurs in the Mediterranean Sea along Greece.
