= Mangelia lastica =

Scientific classification
- Kingdom: Animalia
- Phylum: Mollusca
- Class: Gastropoda
- Subclass: Caenogastropoda
- Order: Neogastropoda
- Superfamily: Conoidea
- Family: Mangeliidae
- Genus: Mangelia
- Species: M. lastica

Binomial name
- Mangelia lastica (W.H. Dall, 1927)

Synonyms
- Mangilia lastica W.H. Dall, 1927

Species of gastropod

Mangelia lastica is a species of sea snail, a marine gastropod mollusk in the family Mangeliidae.

== Description ==
The length of the shell attains 11 mm, its diameter 4 mm.

(Original description) The small, slender shell is whitish, The aperture measures about one-third the whole length. The shell contains smooth protoconch of 1½ to two whorls and seven subsequent well rounded whorls. The suture is distinct, not appressed. The fasciole in front of it is flattish and sloping. The sculpture varies in strength in different individuals; usually stronger on the earlier whorls. The axial sculpture consists of numerous protractively oblique narrow ribs with subequal interspaces, flexuous but not prominent (as a rule) on the fasciole and absent from the base. The incremental lines are inconspicuous. The spiral sculpture consists of two equal threads just behind the suture, but not equally obvious in all the specimens, especially the young. In those with a strong sculpture there are two or three more or less evident small threads overriding the ribs, but in all young cases the base is smooth. The ribs stop abruptly. In the fully adult there may be a few obsolete spirals on the base, and a few evident ones on the siphonal canal. The aperture is subovate with a wide and short siphonal canal. The outer lip is protractively arcuate. The anal sinus is shallow and wide. The columella is short and attenuated in front. The axis is impervious.

== Distribution ==
This marine species was found off Fernandina, Florida, USA.
