= Mangelia beduina =

Scientific classification
- Kingdom: Animalia
- Phylum: Mollusca
- Class: Gastropoda
- Subclass: Caenogastropoda
- Order: Neogastropoda
- Superfamily: Conoidea
- Family: Mangeliidae
- Genus: Mangelia
- Species: M. beduina

Binomial name
- Mangelia beduina J. Thiele, 1925

Species of gastropod

Mangelia beduina is a species of sea snail, a marine gastropod mollusc in the family Mangeliidae.

== Distribution ==
This marine species occurs off Somalia
