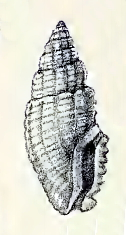
- Original image of a shell of Mangelia myrmecodes

Scientific classification
- Kingdom: Animalia
- Phylum: Mollusca
- Class: Gastropoda
- Subclass: Caenogastropoda
- Order: Neogastropoda
- Superfamily: Conoidea
- Family: Mangeliidae
- Genus: Mangelia
- Species: M. myrmecodes

Binomial name
- Mangelia myrmecodes J.C. Melvill & R. Standen, 1901

Synonyms
- Mangilia myrmecodes J.C. Melvill & R. Standen, 1901 (original combination)

= Mangelia myrmecodes =

Species of gastropod

Mangelia myrmecodes is a species of sea snail, a marine gastropod mollusk in the family Mangeliidae.

== Description ==
The length of the shell attains 5 mm, its diameter 2.55 mm.

(Original description) The solid shell is oblong and has a pale straw color. It contains six whorls. The protoconch is nipple-shaped and slightly translucent. The other whorls show pronounced noduled ribs (11 on the body whorl). The many spiral lirae form nodules when crossing the ribs. The aperture is narrow. The sinus is wide. The outer lip is incrassate and crenulate. The columella stands upright. It is best distinguished by its noduled ribs, which are particularly well defined.

== Distribution ==
This marine species occurs off Pakistan.
