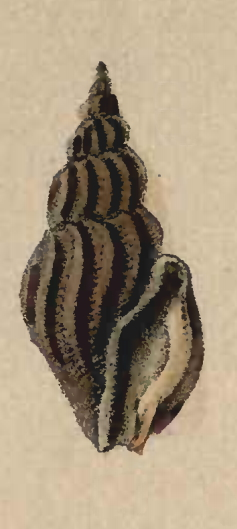
- Drawing of a shell of Mangelia sicula

Scientific classification
- Kingdom: Animalia
- Phylum: Mollusca
- Class: Gastropoda
- Subclass: Caenogastropoda
- Order: Neogastropoda
- Superfamily: Conoidea
- Family: Mangeliidae
- Genus: Mangelia
- Species: M. sicula

Binomial name
- Mangelia sicula L.A. Reeve, 1846

Synonyms
- Mangelia kieneri C. Maravigna, 1840; Mangelia philippii H.C. Weinkauff, 1868; Mangelia (Mangiliella) sicula (L.A. Reeve, 1846); Mangiliella sicula (L.A. Reeve, 1846); Pleurotoma kieneri Maravigna, C., 1840; Raphitoma philippii Weinkauff, H.C., 1868

= Mangelia sicula =

Species of gastropod

Mangelia sicula, common name the Sicilian mangelia, is a species of sea snail, a marine gastropod mollusk in the family Mangeliidae.

== Description ==
The length of the shell attains 12 mm.

(Original description) The shell is somewhat fusiform. The spire is acuminated. The whorls are rounded, rather gibbous, concentrically ribbed, smooth. The aperture is short and ovate. The sinus is rather conspicuous. The color of the shell is dark chesnut-brown within and without. The lip is yellowish, crossed with fine brown lines.

The color of the shell is chestnut- or chocolate-brown within and without, with narrow brown lines, more conspicuous on the thickened lip, which is lighter colored. The whorls are rounded, rather gibbous, those of the spire obtusely angulated.

== Distribution ==
This marine species occurs in the Mediterranean Sea off Cyprus and Italy; in the Atlantic Ocean off Madeira.
