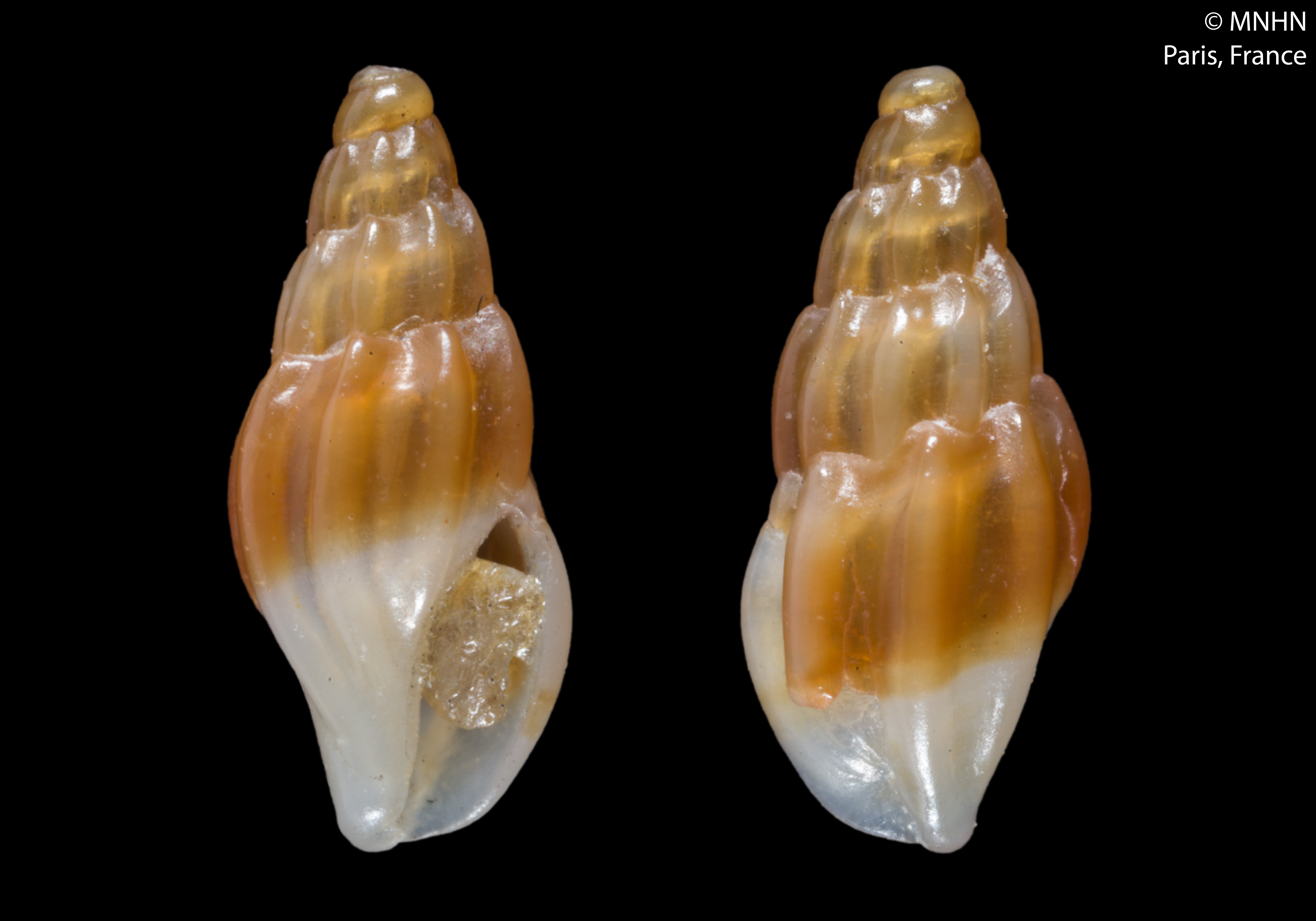
- Shell of Mangelia costata (syntype at MNHN, Paris)

Scientific classification
- Kingdom: Animalia
- Phylum: Mollusca
- Class: Gastropoda
- Subclass: Caenogastropoda
- Order: Neogastropoda
- Superfamily: Conoidea
- Family: Mangeliidae
- Genus: Mangelia
- Species: M. costata

Binomial name
- Mangelia costata (Pennant, 1777)

Synonyms
- Cytharella coarctata (Forbes, 1840); Fusus fasciatus Brown, C.T., 1827; Mangelia coarctata (Forbes, 1840) (junior synonym); Mangelia pennantiana Gray, J.E., 1852; Mangelia pusilla Reeve, L.A., 1846; Mangilia atlantica Pallary, 1920; Mangilia atlantica var. elongata Pallary, 1920; Mangilia patula Locard, 1892; Mangiliella atlantica (Pallary, 1920); Murex costatus Pennant, 1777; Pleurotoma coarctata Forbes, 1840 (original combination); Pleurotoma metcalfei Thorpe, J.P., 1844

= Mangelia costata =

Species of gastropod

Mangelia costata is a species of sea snail, a marine gastropod mollusk in the family Mangeliidae.

== Description ==
The length of the shell varies between 1.6 mm and 12 mm.

The shell has 7 or 8 stout ribs. The whorls are without shoulders. The spire varies in length. The spire and the upper half of the body whorl are chestnut- or chocolate-color, while the lower half of the body whorl is light yellowish brown, sometimes yellowish brown with darker lineations.

== Distribution ==
This species occurs in European waters, in the Atlantic Ocean off the Azores and in the Mediterranean Sea.

Fossils have been found in Pliocene strata of Italy and in Quaternary strata of Portugal; age range : 3.6 to 0.012 Ma
