= Mangelia sallespissensis =

Conservation status
- Extinct (IUCN 3.1)

Scientific classification
- Kingdom: Animalia
- Phylum: Mollusca
- Class: Gastropoda
- Subclass: Caenogastropoda
- Order: Neogastropoda
- Superfamily: Conoidea
- Family: Mangeliidae
- Genus: Mangelia
- Species: †M. sallespissensis

Binomial name
- †Mangelia sallespissensis M.A. Peyrot, 1932

Species of gastropod

Mangelia sallespissensis is a minute extinct species of sea snail, a marine gastropod mollusk in the family Mangeliidae.

== Description ==
The length of the shell attains 9 mm.

== Distribution ==
This extinct marine species was found in the Miocene strata of Aquitaine, France.
