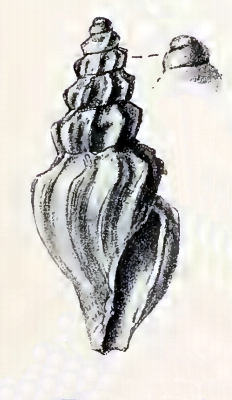
- Original image of a shell (and protoconch) of Mangelia woodwardiae

Scientific classification
- Kingdom: Animalia
- Phylum: Mollusca
- Class: Gastropoda
- Subclass: Caenogastropoda
- Order: Neogastropoda
- Superfamily: Conoidea
- Family: Mangeliidae
- Genus: Mangelia
- Species: M. woodwardiae

Binomial name
- Mangelia woodwardiae J.C. Melvill, 1917

Synonyms
- Mangilia woodwardiae J.C. Melvill, 1917 (original combination)

= Mangelia woodwardiae =

Species of gastropod

Mangelia woodwardiae is a species of sea snail, a marine gastropod mollusk in the family Mangeliidae.

== Description ==
The length of the shell attains 9 mm, its diameter 4 mm.

The small, whitish shell has a broadened fusiform shape. It contains 7 whorls, of which two vitreous and globular whorls in the protoconch. The shell shows a conspicuous central acute angle in the lower whorls. The whorls are longitudinally crossed by thickish oblique ribs (8 on the body whorl) and intersected by few spiral lirae. The narrow aperture is oblong. The outer lip is invrassate. The columellar margin is straight at its base. The sinus is very obscure. The siphonal canal is hardly produced.

== Distribution ==
This marine species occurs in the Persian Gulf.
