= Mangelia victoriana =

Scientific classification
- Kingdom: Animalia
- Phylum: Mollusca
- Class: Gastropoda
- Subclass: Caenogastropoda
- Order: Neogastropoda
- Superfamily: Conoidea
- Family: Mangeliidae
- Genus: Mangelia
- Species: M. victoriana

Binomial name
- Mangelia victoriana W. H. Dall, 1897

Synonyms
- Cytharella victoriana (Dall, W.H., 1897)

Species of gastropod

Mangelia victoriana is a species of sea snail, a marine gastropod mollusk in the family Mangeliidae.

== Distribution ==
This marine species occurs off Victoria, Vancouver Island, Canada.
