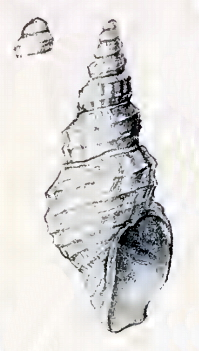
- Original image of a shell (and protoconch) of Mangelia olivieriana

Scientific classification
- Kingdom: Animalia
- Phylum: Mollusca
- Class: Gastropoda
- Subclass: Caenogastropoda
- Order: Neogastropoda
- Superfamily: Conoidea
- Family: Mangeliidae
- Genus: Mangelia
- Species: M. olivieriana

Binomial name
- Mangelia olivieriana J.C. Melvill, 1917

Synonyms
- Mangilia olivieriana J.C. Melvill, 1917

= Mangelia olivieriana =

Species of gastropod

Mangelia olivieriana is a species of sea snail, a marine gastropod mollusk in the family Mangeliidae.

== Description ==
The length of the shell can reach 9 mm, its diameter 3 mm.

This is a thin species that is sparse in its distribution. It has a milky-white or bluish colour, with an olive-brown fugitive epidermis. It is 8-whorled, three being only very slightly ridged, and crossed with coarsish distant raised lines. The aperture is wide. The outer lip is thin. The sinus is wide but very shallow. The columella is straight.

== Distribution ==
This marine species can be found off Baluchistan facing the coast of Oman.
