= Mangelia acuticostata =

Scientific classification
- Kingdom: Animalia
- Phylum: Mollusca
- Class: Gastropoda
- Subclass: Caenogastropoda
- Order: Neogastropoda
- Superfamily: Conoidea
- Family: Mangeliidae
- Genus: Mangelia
- Species: †M. acuticostata

Binomial name
- †Mangelia acuticostata P. Nyst, 1836

Extinct species of gastropod

Mangelia acuticostata is an extinct species of sea snail, a marine gastropod mollusk in the family Mangeliidae.

== Description ==
The length of the shell attains 17 mm.

== Distribution ==
This extinct marine species was found in Eocene strata in Ukraine.
