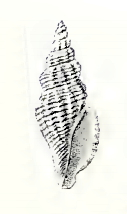
- Original image of a shell of Mangelia andamanensis

Scientific classification
- Kingdom: Animalia
- Phylum: Mollusca
- Class: Gastropoda
- Subclass: Caenogastropoda
- Order: Neogastropoda
- Superfamily: Conoidea
- Family: Mangeliidae
- Genus: Mangelia
- Species: M. andamanensis

Binomial name
- Mangelia andamanensis H.B. Preston, 1908

Synonyms
- Mangilia andamanensis H.B. Preston, 1908 (original description)

= Mangelia andamanensis =

Species of sea snail

Mangelia andamanensis is a species of sea snail, a marine gastropod mollusk in the family Mangeliidae.

== Description ==
The length of the shell attains 6 mm, its diameter 2 mm.

(Original description) The slenderly fusiform shell is pale yellowish brown, blotched here and there with light chestnut. It contains 7 whorls, convex, angled above. The first two are horny, the later whorls sculptured with transverse ridges and fine spiral striae, presenting a finely cancellate appearance. The sutures are deeply impressed. The aperture is oval. The outer lip is varicosely thickened. The sinus is broad but not deep.

== Distribution ==
This marine species occurs off the Andaman Islands
