= Mangelia maoica =

- Original image of a shell of Mangelia maoica

Scientific classification
- Kingdom: Animalia
- Phylum: Mollusca
- Class: Gastropoda
- Subclass: Caenogastropoda
- Order: Neogastropoda
- Superfamily: Conoidea
- Family: Mangeliidae
- Genus: Mangelia
- Species: M. maoica

Binomial name
- Mangelia maoica C.J. Maury, 1917

Synonyms
- Mangilia maoica C.J. Maury, 1917 (original combination)

Species of gastropod

Mangelia maoica is a minute extinct species of sea snail, a marine gastropod mollusk in the family Mangeliidae.

== Description ==
The length of the shell attains 4 mm, its diameter 1.5 mm.

(Original description) The small shell is turreted. The protoconch contains 4 whorls, glassy, the last volution carinated and delicately longitudinally ribbed. The 4 subsequent whorls are strongly carinated in young shells but in the adult the body whorl becomes gently rounded, losing the carina. In some specimens the entire surface is adorned with microscopic, frosty, beaded spiral threads alternating with still finer granular lines, in other shells the beaded spirals are inconspicuous over the general surface, but become progressively stronger on approaching the suture. The ones bordering the suture are the strongest. The whorls contain ten undulating ribs, slightly tuberculate at the carina, extending from suture to suture. The outer lip is thickened in adult, sinus U-shaped and deep.

== Distribution ==
This extinct marine species was found in Miocene strata of the Dominican Republic.
