= Mangelia angolensis =

Scientific classification
- Kingdom: Animalia
- Phylum: Mollusca
- Class: Gastropoda
- Subclass: Caenogastropoda
- Order: Neogastropoda
- Superfamily: Conoidea
- Family: Mangeliidae
- Genus: Mangelia
- Species: M. angolensis

Binomial name
- Mangelia angolensis J. Thiele, 1925

Species of gastropod

Mangelia angolensis is a species of sea snail, a marine gastropod mollusk in the family Mangeliidae.

== Description ==
The length of the shell attains 9 mm.

== Distribution ==
This marine species occurs off Guinea, West Africa.
