= Mangelia barashi =

Scientific classification
- Kingdom: Animalia
- Phylum: Mollusca
- Class: Gastropoda
- Subclass: Caenogastropoda
- Order: Neogastropoda
- Superfamily: Conoidea
- Family: Mangeliidae
- Genus: Mangelia
- Species: M. barashi

Binomial name
- Mangelia barashi (van Aartsen & Fehr-de Wal, 1978)

Synonyms
- Mangiliella barashi Aartsen & Fehr-de Wal, 1978

Species of gastropod

Mangelia barashi is a species of sea snail, a marine gastropod mollusk in the family Mangeliidae.

== Description ==
The length of the shell attains 5 mm.

== Distribution ==
This species occurs in the Mediterranean Sea.
