= Mangelia elegantissima =

Scientific classification
- Kingdom: Animalia
- Phylum: Mollusca
- Class: Gastropoda
- Subclass: Caenogastropoda
- Order: Neogastropoda
- Superfamily: Conoidea
- Family: Mangeliidae
- Genus: Mangelia
- Species: M. elegantissima

Binomial name
- Mangelia elegantissima E.W. Vredenburg, 1921

Extinct species of gastropod

Mangelia elegantissima is an extinct species of sea snail, a marine gastropod mollusk in the family Mangeliidae.

Not to be confounded with Mangelia elegantissima (Melvill & Standen, 1903), originally described as Cythara elegantissima and now a synonym of Paraclathurella gracilenta (Reeve, 1843)

== Distribution ==
This extinct marine species was found in Miocene strata of Myanmar
