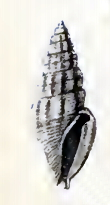
- Original image of a shell of Mangelia terpnisma

Scientific classification
- Kingdom: Animalia
- Phylum: Mollusca
- Class: Gastropoda
- Subclass: Caenogastropoda
- Order: Neogastropoda
- Superfamily: Conoidea
- Family: Mangeliidae
- Genus: Mangelia
- Species: M. terpnisma

Binomial name
- Mangelia terpnisma J.C. Melvill & R. Standen, 1901

Synonyms
- Mangilia terpnisma J.C. Melvill & R. Standen, 1901 (original combination)

= Mangelia terpnisma =

Species of gastropod

Mangelia terpnisma is a species of sea snail, a marine gastropod mollusk in the family Mangeliidae.

== Description ==
The length of the shell attains 9 mm, its diameter 3 mm.

(Original description) The fusiform shell is characterized by its stout build. The 8 whorls are once-angled. They are longitudinally crassicostate with straight ribs and spirally lirate with irregular lirae. Its color is whitish, banded and filleted with chestnut. The incrassate outer lip is much thickened, taeniate, within blood-red or, in one example, chestnut. The columella is stained at the base with the same colour. The aperture is narrow, cinereous or slate-coloured within. The very short siphonal canal is slightly curved.

== Distribution ==
This marine species occurs in the Gulf of Oman.
