= Mangelia fordii =

Scientific classification
- Kingdom: Animalia
- Phylum: Mollusca
- Class: Gastropoda
- Subclass: Caenogastropoda
- Order: Neogastropoda
- Superfamily: Conoidea
- Family: Mangeliidae
- Genus: Mangelia
- Species: M. fordii

Binomial name
- Mangelia fordii (E.A. Smith, 1888)

Synonyms
- Pleurotoma (Mangilia) fordii E.A. Smith, 1888 (original combination)

Species of gastropod

Mangelia fordii is a species of sea snail, a marine gastropod mollusk in the family Mangeliidae.

== Description ==
The length of the shell attains 4 1/3 mm, its diameter 1 1/2 mm.

The ovate-fusiform shell is white. The shell contains 6 whorls, of which 2 smooth whorls in the protoconch. The subsequent whorls are slightly convex. This unpretending little shell has for its chief distinctive characters the 8 rounded ribs and fine spiral striation, and the outer lip is thickened within at a little distance from the acute margin. The small aperture is narrow. The columella shows a small callus. The siphonal canal is very short.

== Distribution ==
The habitat is unknown.
