= Mangelia sciola =

Scientific classification
- Kingdom: Animalia
- Phylum: Mollusca
- Class: Gastropoda
- Subclass: Caenogastropoda
- Order: Neogastropoda
- Superfamily: Conoidea
- Family: Mangeliidae
- Genus: Mangelia
- Species: M. sciola

Binomial name
- Mangelia sciola K.H. Barnard, 1958

Synonyms
- Mangilia sciola K.H. Barnard, 1958

Species of gastropod

Mangelia sciola is a species of sea snail, a marine gastropod mollusk in the family Mangeliidae.

== Description ==
The length of the shell attains 3 mm, its diameter is 1.5 mm.

== Distribution ==
This marine species occurs off South Africa.
