= Mangelia pseudocordieri =

Scientific classification
- Kingdom: Animalia
- Phylum: Mollusca
- Class: Gastropoda
- Subclass: Caenogastropoda
- Order: Neogastropoda
- Superfamily: Conoidea
- Family: Mangeliidae
- Genus: Mangelia
- Species: M. pseudocordieri

Binomial name
- Mangelia pseudocordieri M.A. Peyrot, 1932

Species of gastropod

Mangelia pseudocordieri is a minute extinct species of sea snail, a marine gastropod mollusk in the family Mangeliidae.

== Description ==
The length of the shell attains 13 mm.

== Distribution ==
This extinct marine species was found in the Miocene strata of Aquitaine, France.
