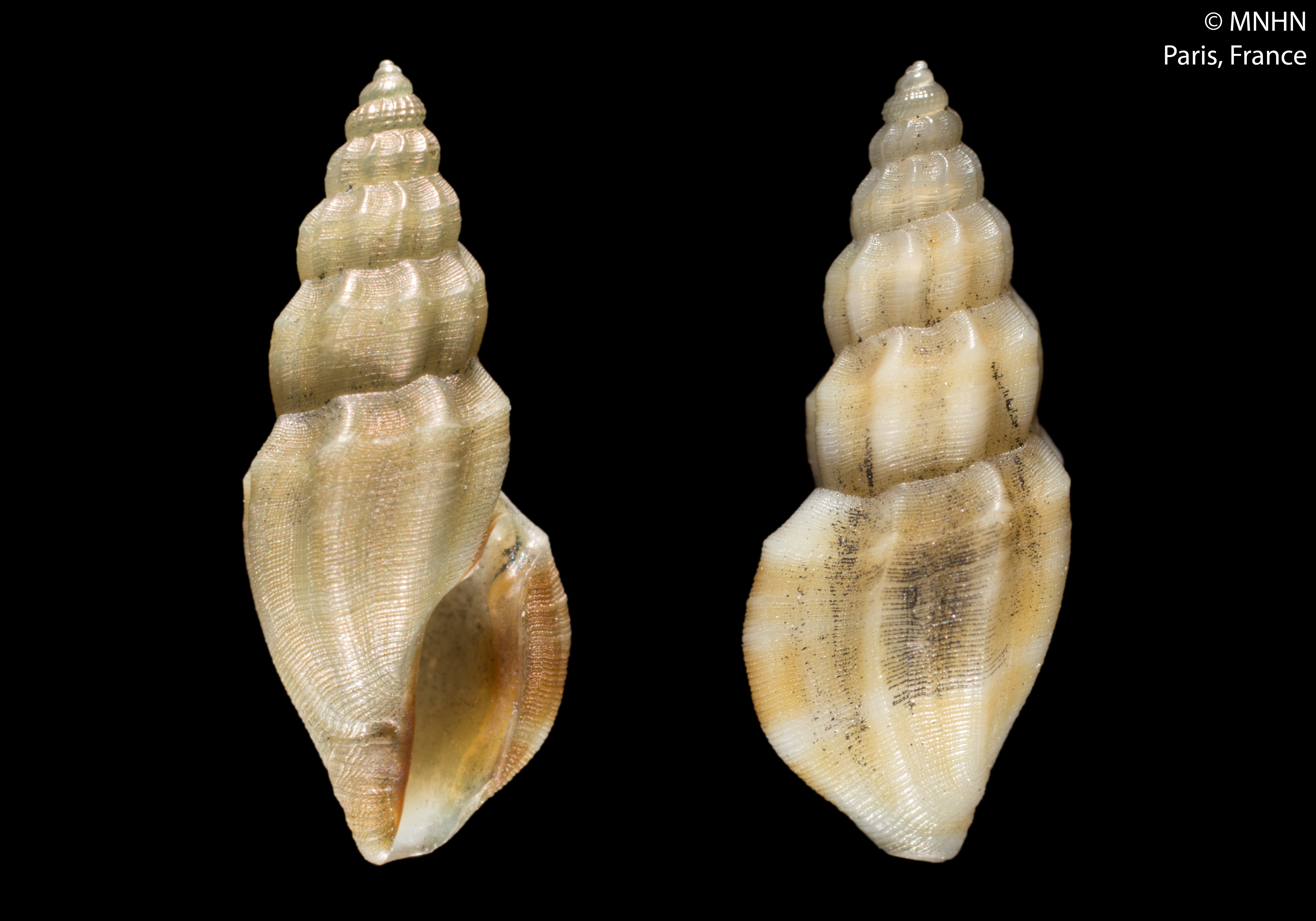

Scientific classification
- Kingdom: Animalia
- Phylum: Mollusca
- Class: Gastropoda
- Subclass: Caenogastropoda
- Order: Neogastropoda
- Superfamily: Conoidea
- Family: Mangeliidae
- Genus: Mangelia
- Species: M. inusitata

Binomial name
- Mangelia inusitata Rolan & Otero-Schmitt, 1999

= Mangelia inusitata =

Species of gastropod

Mangelia inusitata is a species of sea snail, a marine gastropod mollusk in the family Mangeliidae.

== Distribution ==
This marine species occurs off Angola.
