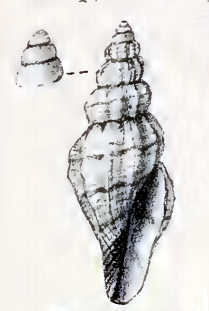
- Original image of a shell (and protoconch) of Mangelia tritaeniata

Scientific classification
- Kingdom: Animalia
- Phylum: Mollusca
- Class: Gastropoda
- Subclass: Caenogastropoda
- Order: Neogastropoda
- Superfamily: Conoidea
- Family: Mangeliidae
- Genus: Mangelia
- Species: M. tritaeniata

Binomial name
- Mangelia tritaeniata J.C. Melvill, 1917

Synonyms
- Mangilia tritaeniata J.C. Melvill, 1917 (original combination)

= Mangelia tritaeniata =

Species of gastropod

Mangelia tritaeniata is a species of sea snail, a marine gastropod mollusk in the family Mangeliidae.

== Description ==
The length of the shell attains 8 mm, its diameter 2.5 mm.

The small shell has a fusiform shape. It contains 8 whorls, of which two or three vitreous and globular whorls in the protoconch. The subsequent ventricose whorls are considerably impressed at the suture. They are longitudinally crossed by many, not very sharp ribs (about 15 on the body whorl) and intersected by thin, spiral lirae. The narrow aperture is oblong. The outer lip is thin. The columella is simple and oblique. The sinus is obscure. The siphonal canal is wide and produced. The shell shows three characteristic red bands on the body whorl.

== Distribution ==
This marine species occurs off Mumbai, Western India.
