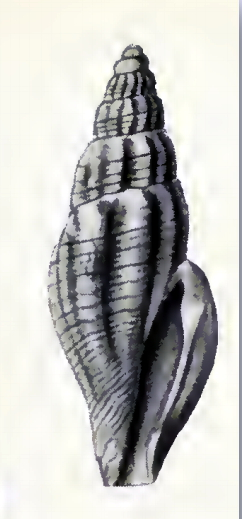
- Image of a shell of Mangelia elevata

Scientific classification
- Kingdom: Animalia
- Phylum: Mollusca
- Class: Gastropoda
- Subclass: Caenogastropoda
- Order: Neogastropoda
- Superfamily: Conoidea
- Family: Mangeliidae
- Genus: Mangelia
- Species: M. elevata

Binomial name
- Mangelia elevata W.M. Gabb, 1873

Synonyms
- Cythara elevata (W.M. Gabb, 1873)

= Mangelia elevata =

Extinct species of gastropod

Mangelia elevata is an extinct species of sea snail, a marine gastropod mollusk in the family Mangeliidae.

== Description ==
The length of the shell attains 6.3 mm, its diameter 2.5 mm.

This small species has 6½ whorls, of which the first 3 comprise the embryonic shell. These whorls are smooth and convex until the last half-whorl, which has close, fine backwardly arched riblets. Subsequent whorls have slightly protractive rounded ribs, eleven on the penultimate whorl, rather high, and compressed below the sutures. In the lower half of each whorl these are crossed by three spiral threads, in the intervals of which there are about three very low spirals. On the body whorl there are about 20 major spirals. They are closer anteriorly, where there are fewer of the low minor spirals, there being four in the upper intervals, down to one in the lower. The aperture is of nearly the same width throughout. The anal sinus is rounded.

== Distribution ==
This extinct marine species was found in Tertiary strata of Santo Domingo
