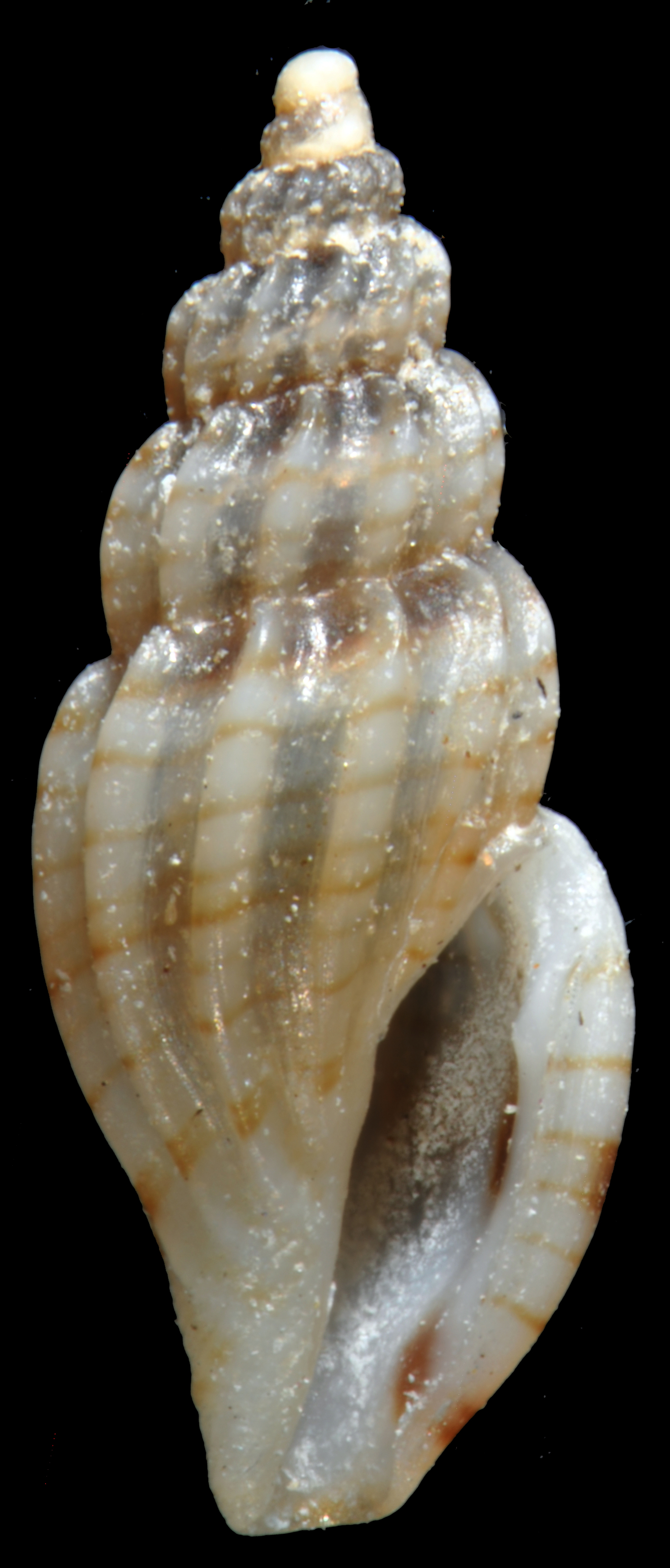
- Shell of Mangelia jerbaensis (holotype at MNHN, Paris)

Scientific classification
- Kingdom: Animalia
- Phylum: Mollusca
- Class: Gastropoda
- Subclass: Caenogastropoda
- Order: Neogastropoda
- Superfamily: Conoidea
- Family: Mangeliidae
- Genus: Mangelia
- Species: M. jerbaensis

Binomial name
- Mangelia jerbaensis Della Bella & Spada in Chirli, 1997

= Mangelia jerbaensis =

Species of gastropod

Mangelia jerbaensis is a species of sea snail, a marine gastropod mollusk in the family Mangeliidae, the cone snails and their allies.

== Distribution ==
This species occurs in the Mediterranean Sea off Tunisia.
