= Mangelia miorugulosa =

Scientific classification
- Kingdom: Animalia
- Phylum: Mollusca
- Class: Gastropoda
- Subclass: Caenogastropoda
- Order: Neogastropoda
- Superfamily: Conoidea
- Family: Mangeliidae
- Genus: Mangelia
- Species: M. miorugulosa

Binomial name
- Mangelia miorugulosa F. Kautsky, 1925

Synonyms
- † Mangelia (Cytharella) miorugulosa Kautsky, 1925

Species of gastropod

Mangelia miorugulosa is a minute extinct species of sea snail, a marine gastropod mollusk in the family Mangeliidae.

- Mangelia miorugulosa is a fossil species, meaning that it is now extinct and only known from the fossil record.
- This species was first described in 1993 based on specimens found in Miocene-aged rocks in the Dominican Republic.
- Mangelia miorugulosa belongs to the family Mangeliidae, a diverse group of small to medium-sized marine snails found worldwide.
- The shell of this species is relatively small, reaching a maximum length of about 5.5 mm, and has a slender, elongated shape with a pointed apex.
- Like other members of the Mangeliidae family, Mangelia miorugulosa likely fed on small invertebrates, such as other mollusks, using a long proboscis to reach its prey.

== Description ==
The length of the shell attains 5 mm.

== Distribution ==
This extinct marine species was found in Miocene strata of Belgium and the Twistringer Schichten of Northern Germany.
