= Mangelia luctuosa =

Scientific classification
- Kingdom: Animalia
- Phylum: Mollusca
- Class: Gastropoda
- Subclass: Caenogastropoda
- Order: Neogastropoda
- Superfamily: Conoidea
- Family: Mangeliidae
- Genus: Mangelia
- Species: M. luctuosa

Binomial name
- Mangelia luctuosa A. d'Orbigny, 1845

Species of gastropod

Mangelia luctuosa is a species of sea snail, a marine gastropod mollusk in the family Mangeliidae.

== Distribution ==
This marine species occurs off the West Indies and the eastern part of Panama.
