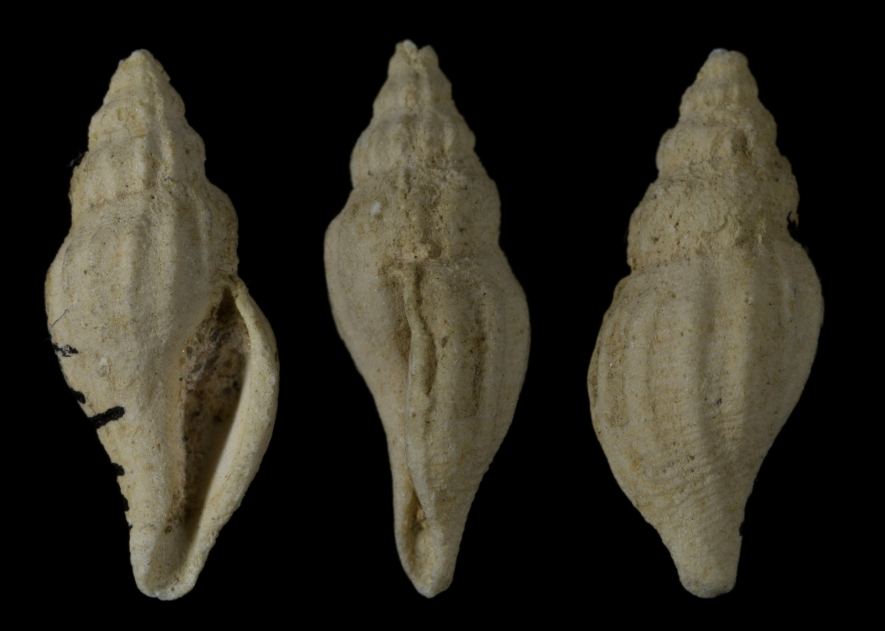
- Shell of Mangelia pivetaui (holotype at MNHN, Paris)

Scientific classification
- Kingdom: Animalia
- Phylum: Mollusca
- Class: Gastropoda
- Subclass: Caenogastropoda
- Order: Neogastropoda
- Superfamily: Conoidea
- Family: Mangeliidae
- Genus: Mangelia
- Species: †M. pivetaui

Binomial name
- †Mangelia pivetaui Chavan, 1945

= Mangelia pivetaui =

Extinct species of gastropod

Mangelia pivetaui is an extinct species of sea snail, a marine gastropod mollusk in the family Mangeliidae.

== Distribution ==
This extinct marine species was found in Miocene strata in Morocco.
