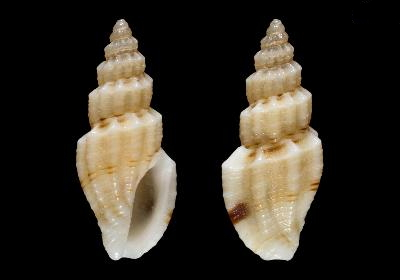
- Shell of Mangelia carinata (holotype in the MNHN, Paris)

Scientific classification
- Kingdom: Animalia
- Phylum: Mollusca
- Class: Gastropoda
- Subclass: Caenogastropoda
- Order: Neogastropoda
- Superfamily: Conoidea
- Family: Mangeliidae
- Genus: Mangelia
- Species: M. carinata

Binomial name
- Mangelia carinata Bozzetti, 2009

= Mangelia carinata =

Species of gastropod

Mangelia carinata is a species of sea snail, a marine gastropod mollusk in the family Mangeliidae.

== Description ==
The length of the shell attains 6.6 mm.

== Distribution ==
This marine species occurs off Madagascar.
