= Mangelia hiradoensis =

Scientific classification
- Kingdom: Animalia
- Phylum: Mollusca
- Class: Gastropoda
- Subclass: Caenogastropoda
- Order: Neogastropoda
- Superfamily: Conoidea
- Family: Mangeliidae
- Genus: Mangelia
- Species: M. hiradoensis

Binomial name
- Mangelia hiradoensis (Makiyama, 1927)

Synonyms
- Cytharella hiradoensis Makiyama, 1927

Species of gastropod

Mangelia hiradoensis is a species of sea snail, a marine gastropod mollusk in the family Mangeliidae.

== Distribution ==
This marine species occurs off Japan.
