= Mangelia miostriolata =

Scientific classification
- Kingdom: Animalia
- Phylum: Mollusca
- Class: Gastropoda
- Subclass: Caenogastropoda
- Order: Neogastropoda
- Superfamily: Conoidea
- Family: Mangeliidae
- Genus: Mangelia
- Species: M. miostriolata

Binomial name
- Mangelia miostriolata (Nordsieck, 1972 )

Species of gastropod

Mangelia miostriolata is a minute extinct species of sea snail, a marine gastropod mollusk in the family Mangeliidae.

== Description ==
The length of the shell attains 4 mm.

== Distribution ==
This extinct marine species was found in Miocene strata of the Netherlands.
