= Mangelia costellaria =

Scientific classification
- Kingdom: Animalia
- Phylum: Mollusca
- Class: Gastropoda
- Subclass: Caenogastropoda
- Order: Neogastropoda
- Superfamily: Conoidea
- Family: Mangeliidae
- Genus: Mangelia
- Species: M. costellaria

Binomial name
- Mangelia costellaria P. Nyst, 1836

Synonyms
- † Pleurotoma costellaria P. Nyst, 1836

Extinct species of gastropod

Mangelia costellaria is an extinct species of sea snail, a marine gastropod mollusk in the family Mangeliidae.

== Distribution ==
This extinct marine species was found in Oligocene strata in Belgium; age range : 33.9 to 28.4 Ma
