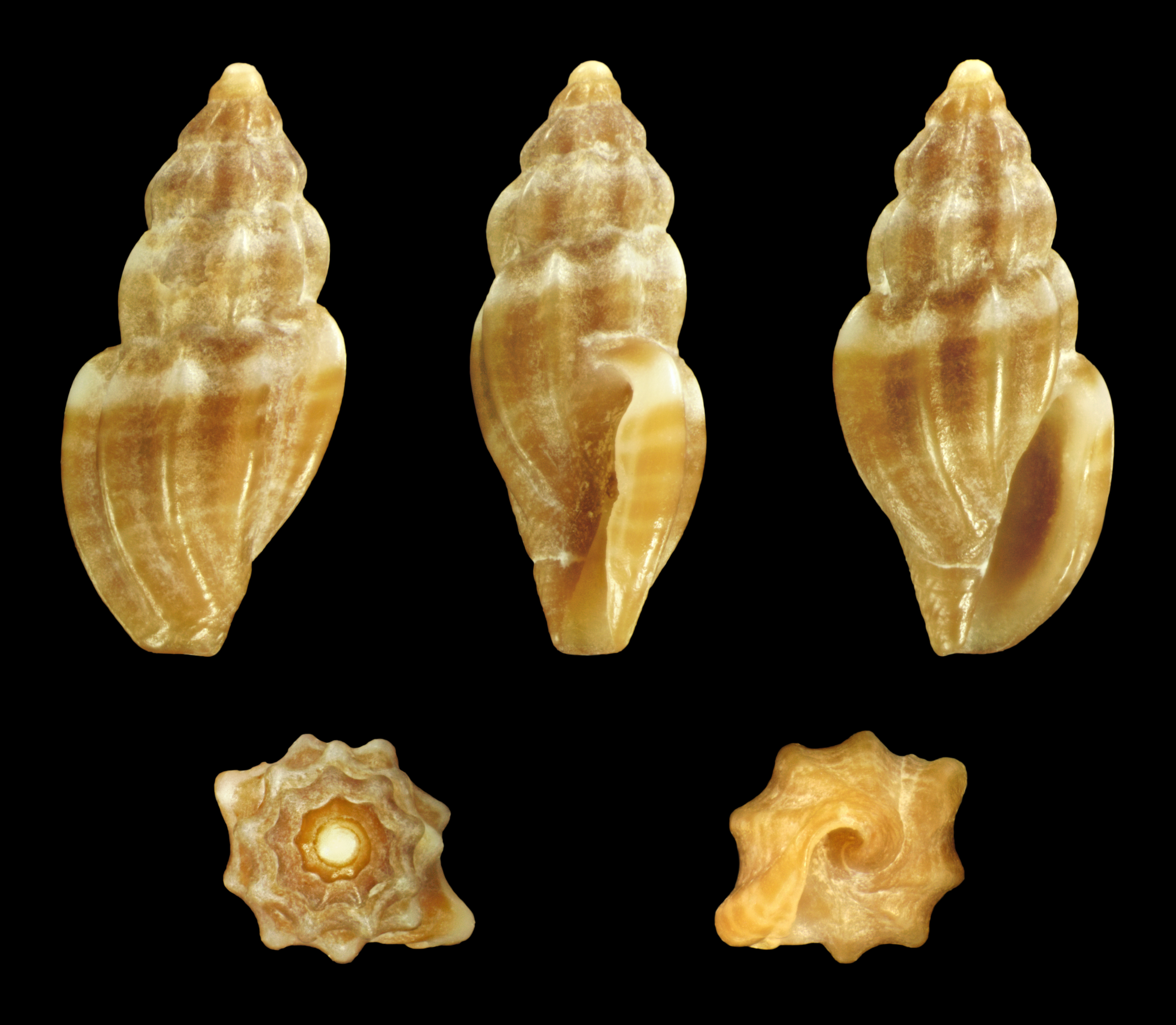
- Shell of Mangelia brusinae

Scientific classification
- Kingdom: Animalia
- Phylum: Mollusca
- Class: Gastropoda
- Subclass: Caenogastropoda
- Order: Neogastropoda
- Superfamily: Conoidea
- Family: Mangeliidae
- Genus: Mangelia
- Species: M. brusinae

Binomial name
- Mangelia brusinae van Aartsen & Fehr-de Wal, 1978

= Mangelia brusinae =

Species of gastropod

Mangelia brusinae is a species of sea snail in the family Mangeliidae.

== Description ==
The length of the shell attains 4 millimetres (0.16 in).

== Distribution ==
This species occurs in the Adriatic Sea.
