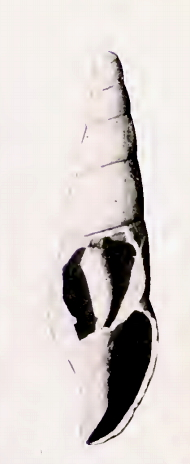
- Image of a shell of Mangelia perattenuata

Scientific classification
- Kingdom: Animalia
- Phylum: Mollusca
- Class: Gastropoda
- Subclass: Caenogastropoda
- Order: Neogastropoda
- Superfamily: Conoidea
- Family: Mangeliidae
- Genus: Mangelia
- Species: M. perattenuata

Binomial name
- Mangelia perattenuata (Dall, 1905)

Synonyms
- Mangilia perattenuata Dall, 1905 (original combination)

= Mangelia perattenuata =

Species of gastropod

Mangelia perattenuata is a species of sea snail, a marine gastropod mollusk in the family Mangeliidae.

It was originally published by W.H. Dall as Magilia perattenuata [sic].

== Description ==
The length of the shell attains 9.5 mm, its diameter 2.5 mm.

(Original description) The small, whitish shell is very slender..It contains one smooth turgid whorl in the protoconch, and six smooth normal subsequent whorls. The whorls are but slightly convex. The suture is very distinct, its posterior margin slightly overhanging or dominant. The aperture is narrow, short and simple. The outer lip is slightly concavely waved between the periphery and the suture. The siphonal canal is short, a little recurved and relatively rather wide.

== Distribution ==
This marine species was found off Monterey Bay, California, USA.
