= Mangelia horneana =

Scientific classification
- Kingdom: Animalia
- Phylum: Mollusca
- Class: Gastropoda
- Subclass: Caenogastropoda
- Order: Neogastropoda
- Superfamily: Conoidea
- Family: Mangeliidae
- Genus: Mangelia
- Species: M. horneana

Binomial name
- Mangelia horneana Smith, E.A., 1884

Species of gastropod

Mangelia horneana is a species of sea snail, a marine gastropod mollusk in the family Mangeliidae.

== Distribution ==
This marine species occurs off Yemen and Aden and in the Persian Gulf.
