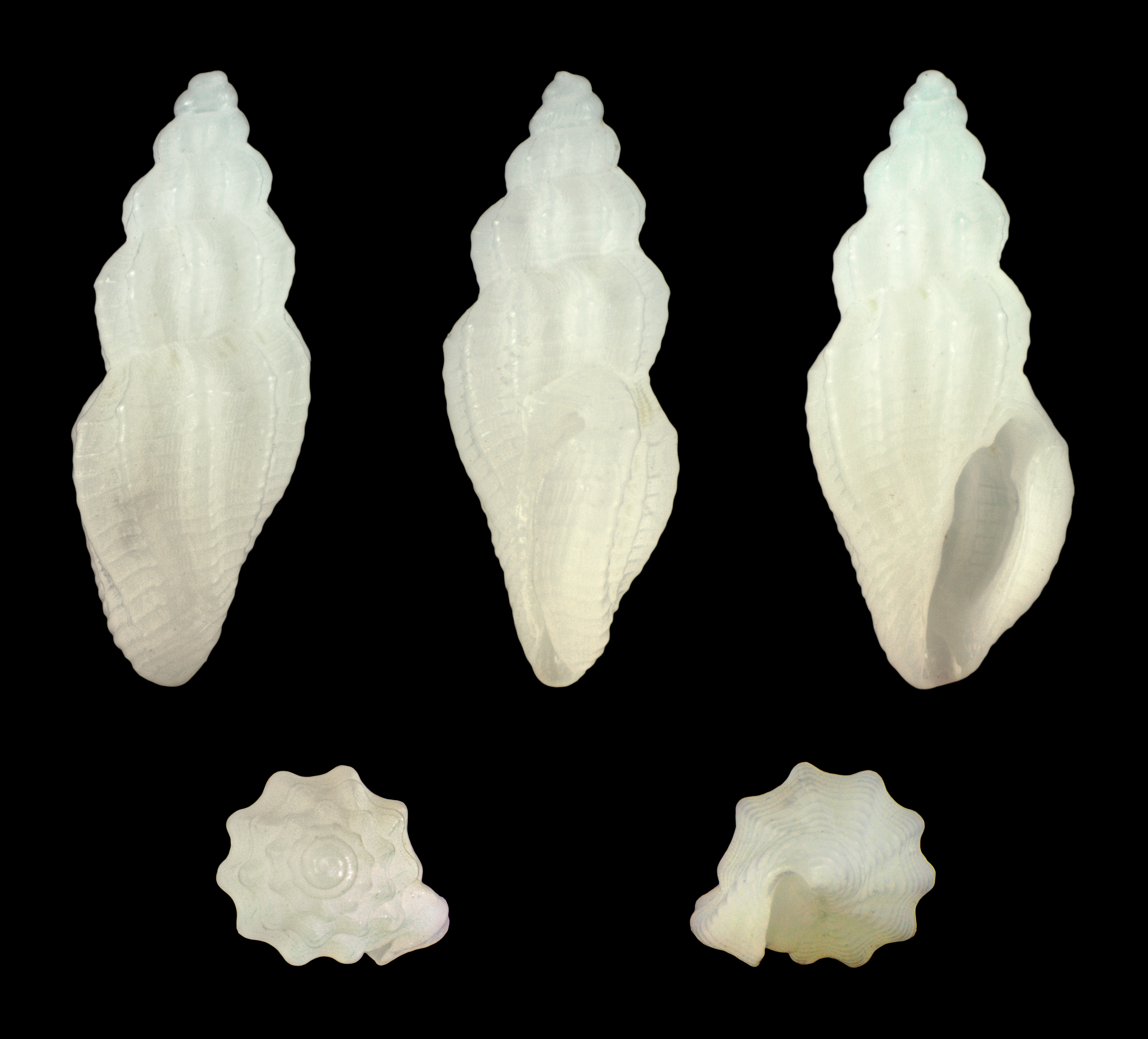
- Shells of Mangelia albolabiata

Scientific classification
- Kingdom: Animalia
- Phylum: Mollusca
- Class: Gastropoda
- Subclass: Caenogastropoda
- Order: Neogastropoda
- Superfamily: Conoidea
- Family: Mangeliidae
- Genus: Mangelia
- Species: M. albolabiata

Binomial name
- Mangelia albolabiata (Smith, E.A., 1884)

Synonyms
- Mangelia albolabrata (E.A. Smith, 1884); Pleurotoma (Mangilia ?) albolabiata E.A. Smith, 1884

= Mangelia albolabiata =

Species of gastropod

Mangelia albolabiata is a species of sea snail, a marine gastropod mollusk in the family Mangeliidae.

== Description ==
The length of the shell attains 5 mm, its diameter 2 mm.

The turreted shell has a subquadrate-ovate shape. It contains 6 whorls, of which the first two are smooth and convex. The third whorl shows many longitudinal and spiral striae. The rest contains 11 ribs that hardly stand out from the background and 3–4 spiral lirae (on the body whorl about 16). Between them are minute, granose striae. The spiral lirations, which are situated on the angle of the whorls, are rather stouter than the rest. They are a little noduled on crossing the ribs. The aperture is narrow and measures about half the total length. The white outer lip is incrassate and on top slightly sinuate, while the siphonal canal is short and narrow. The brown band on the body whorl is more decided towards the outer lip, and in some specimens it is only visible on that part of the whorl.

== Distribution ==
This species occurs in the Persian Gulf and in the Indian Ocean off Karachi and Bombay.
