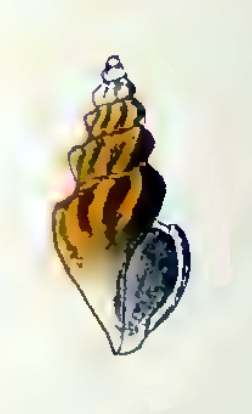
- Original image of a shell of Mangelia robusticostata

Scientific classification
- Kingdom: Animalia
- Phylum: Mollusca
- Class: Gastropoda
- Subclass: Caenogastropoda
- Order: Neogastropoda
- Superfamily: Conoidea
- Family: Mangeliidae
- Genus: Mangelia
- Species: M. robusticostata

Binomial name
- Mangelia robusticostata (E. A. Smith, 1879)

Synonyms
- Cytharella robusticostata (E. A. Smith, 1879); Mangilia robusticostata E.A. Smith, 1879 (original combination)

= Mangelia robusticostata =

Species of gastropod

Mangelia robusticostata is a species of sea snail, a marine gastropod mollusk in the family Mangeliidae.

== Description ==
The length of the shell attains 6.3 mm, its diameter 2.5 mm.

(Original description) The shell is ovately fusiform. The color is light brown, whitish at the base of the body whorl and outer lip. It contains 6 whorls with 1½ whorls in the apex. The succeeding whorls form the protoconch, globose, large, smooth. The subsequent whorls are turreted, angulated at the upper part at a short distance from the suture, beneath the angulation, which is rounded, sloping inward, so that they are much narrower at the lower part than at the angle, obliquely costate, and striated by the incremental lines. The ribs are very thick (12 on the penultimate whorl), subacute at their edge, and almost adjacent to one another at their bases, thinner and at times sublamellar at the upper extremities, and very obliquely flexuous from the angle downwards. On the last whorl they gradually become obsolete below the middle. The aperture is small, livid brown within, except near the lip, where it is whitish. The outer lip is thin at the extreme edge, strengthened exteriorly by the last well-developed rib, which is white with a single livid-brown spot a little below the middle. The sinus is scarcely discernible. The columella is smooth, slightly oblique, subrectilinear, covered with a thin callosity which unites at the upper extremity with the termination of the outer lip. The siphonal canal is very short.

The whorls are turreted, with a strongly angular periphery. They show twelve short, oblique ribs. The outer lip is thin at the edge, but thickened externally by one of the ribs. The sinus is scarcely discernible. The color of the shell is yellowish brown, whitish towards the base of the body whorl and outer lip.

== Distribution ==
This marine species was found off Japan.
