= Mangelia lalonis =

- Original image of a shell of Mangelia lalonis

Scientific classification
- Kingdom: Animalia
- Phylum: Mollusca
- Class: Gastropoda
- Subclass: Caenogastropoda
- Order: Neogastropoda
- Superfamily: Conoidea
- Family: Mangeliidae
- Genus: Mangelia
- Species: M. lalonis

Binomial name
- Mangelia lalonis C.J. Maury, 1917

Synonyms
- Mangilia lalonis C.J.Maury, 1917 (original combination)

Species of gastropod

Mangelia lalonis is a minute extinct species of sea snail, a marine gastropod mollusk in the family Mangeliidae.

== Description ==
The length of the shell varies 6 mm, its diameter 2.5 mm.

(Original description) The shell shows seven strongly carinate whorls. The first two form the protoconch, the apical being invariably set at an angle to the main axis of the shell, and the second strongly keeled and delicately ribbed. The five subsequent whorls are adorned with straight longitudinal ribs, extending from suture to suture, and numbering nine on the body whorl. The spiral sculpture consists of frosty, beaded threads, with groups of two or three finer between the larger threads. In adult shells the posterior sinus is inconspicuous. The outer lip is not thickened.

== Distribution ==
This extinct marine species was found in Pliocene strata of the Dominican Republic.
