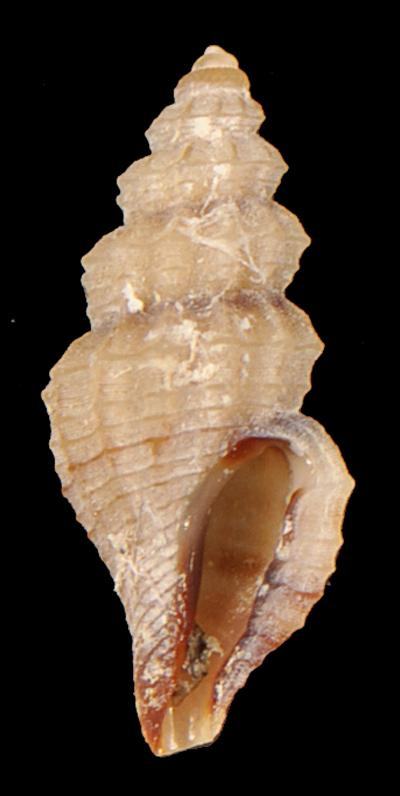
- Shell of Mangelia ceroplasta (museum specimen at MNHN, Paris)

Scientific classification
- Kingdom: Animalia
- Phylum: Mollusca
- Class: Gastropoda
- Subclass: Caenogastropoda
- Order: Neogastropoda
- Superfamily: Conoidea
- Family: Mangeliidae
- Genus: Mangelia
- Species: M. ceroplasta

Binomial name
- Mangelia ceroplasta (Bush, 1885)

Synonyms
- Mangilia ceroplasta Bush, 1885

= Mangelia ceroplasta =

Species of gastropod

Mangelia ceroplasta is a species of sea snail, a marine gastropod mollusk in the family Mangeliidae.

== Description ==
The length of the shell attains 5.5 mm.

== Distribution ==
This marine species occurs off North Carolina, USA and Martinique.
