= Mangelia mica =

Scientific classification
- Kingdom: Animalia
- Phylum: Mollusca
- Class: Gastropoda
- Subclass: Caenogastropoda
- Order: Neogastropoda
- Superfamily: Conoidea
- Family: Mangeliidae
- Genus: Mangelia
- Species: M. mica

Binomial name
- Mangelia mica (R. A. Philippi, 1849)

Synonyms
- Mangilia mica R.A. Philippi, 1849

Species of gastropod

Mangelia mica is a species of sea snail, a marine gastropod mollusk in the family Mangeliidae.

== Distribution ==
This species occurs in the Red Sea.
