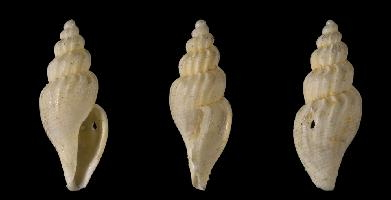
- Shell of † Mangelia coplicata (specimen at MNHN, Paris)

Scientific classification
- Kingdom: Animalia
- Phylum: Mollusca
- Class: Gastropoda
- Subclass: Caenogastropoda
- Order: Neogastropoda
- Superfamily: Conoidea
- Family: Mangeliidae
- Genus: Mangelia
- Species: M. coplicata

Binomial name
- Mangelia coplicata A. Pezant, 1905

Synonyms
- † Fusus plicatus Lamarck, 1803; † Mangelia (Mangiliella) coplicata (Pezant, 1905); † Mangilia capillacea Cossmann, 1902; † Mangilia coplicata Pezant, 1905; † Mangilia lamarcki Pezant, 1905; † Mangilia parisiensis Cossmann, 1889; † Pleurotoma plicata Lamarck, 1804; † Pleurotoma pseudoharpula d’Orbigny, 1850 (original description)

= Mangelia coplicata =

Extinct species of gastropod

Mangelia coplicata is an extinct species of sea snail, a marine gastropod mollusk in the family Mangeliidae. The length of the shell attains 9 mm. This extinct marine species was found in Eocene strata in the Paris Basin, France.
