= Mangelia hanna =

Scientific classification
- Kingdom: Animalia
- Phylum: Mollusca
- Class: Gastropoda
- Subclass: Caenogastropoda
- Order: Neogastropoda
- Superfamily: Conoidea
- Family: Mangeliidae
- Genus: Mangelia
- Species: M. hanna

Binomial name
- Mangelia hanna Thiele, 1925

Synonyms
- Cythara congoensis (Thiele, J., 1925)

Species of gastropod

Mangelia hanna is a species of sea snail, a marine gastropod mollusk in the family Mangeliidae.

== Distribution ==
This marine species occurs off East Africa.
