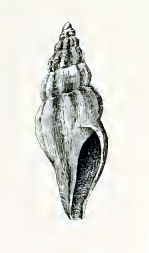
- Original image of a shell of Mangelia painei

Scientific classification
- Kingdom: Animalia
- Phylum: Mollusca
- Class: Gastropoda
- Subclass: Caenogastropoda
- Order: Neogastropoda
- Superfamily: Conoidea
- Family: Mangeliidae
- Genus: Mangelia
- Species: M. painei

Binomial name
- Mangelia painei R. Arnold, 1903

Synonyms
- Mangilia painei Arnold, 1903

= Mangelia painei =

Extinct species of gastropod

Mangelia painei is an extinct species of sea snail, a marine gastropod mollusk in the family Mangeliidae.

== Description ==
The length of the shell attains 12 mm, its diameter 4.2 mm.

(Original description) The small shell has an elongate-fusiform shape. The spire is elevated with a rounded apex It contains seven whorls, evenly convex, with about eleven slightly transverse, rounded ribs, which become obsolete at the sutures. The spiral sculpture is obsolete. The aperture is narrow, elliptical, narrowing anteriorly to siphonal canal. This siphonal canalis truncate in front. The posterior sinus is small. The outer lip is arcuate, thin, with a faint ridge on the interior. The suture is deeply impressed. The columella is long, smooth within, obsolete sculpture without. .

== Distribution ==
This extinct marine species was found in Pleistocene strata off San Pedro to San Diego, California, USA.
