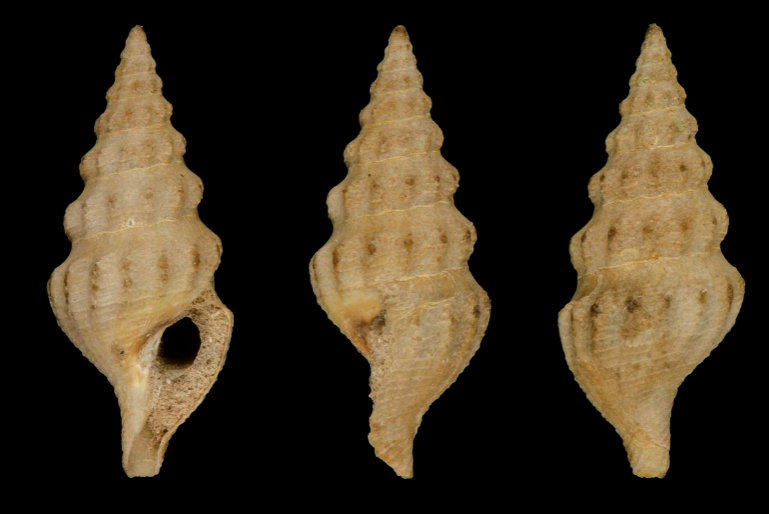
- Shell of Mangelia halitropis (holotype at the Smithsonian Institution)

Scientific classification
- Kingdom: Animalia
- Phylum: Mollusca
- Class: Gastropoda
- Subclass: Caenogastropoda
- Order: Neogastropoda
- Superfamily: Conoidea
- Family: Mangeliidae
- Genus: Mangelia
- Species: M. halitropis

Binomial name
- Mangelia halitropis W.H. Dall, 1889

Synonyms
- Mangilia halitropis W.H. Dall, 1889 (original combination)

= Mangelia halitropis =

Species of gastropod

Mangelia halitropis is a species of sea snail, a marine gastropod mollusk in the family Mangeliidae.

== Description ==
The length of the shell attains 17 mm.

(Original description) The shell contains eight whorls and a small protoconch. It is white or ashy, with a pointed spire and a broad body whorl. The surface of the shell is microscopically granose or shagreened. The fasciole is wide, smooth except for faint arched incremental lines, excavated, extending from the appressed suture to the angle of the whorls. The spiral sculpture consists of slender elevated threads, tending to run in pairs, with wide interspaces, and extending from the fasciole to the suture in front. There are five or six threads on the whorl next to the last and 20–22 on the body whorl including the siphonal canal. These, without becoming swollen, run over (on the body whorl 16) numerous oblique riblets, beginning at the angle of the whorls where they are largest, crossing the whorl and becoming obsolete on the base. The aperture is rather narrow. The outer lip is thin and arched. The notch at the suture is moderately deep and rounded. The inner lip is slightly excavated. The columella is straight and attenuated in front. The siphonal canal is short and slightly twisted.

== Distribution ==
This marine species occurs off the Virgin Islands.
