= Mangelia vacavillensis =

Scientific classification
- Kingdom: Animalia
- Phylum: Mollusca
- Class: Gastropoda
- Subclass: Caenogastropoda
- Order: Neogastropoda
- Superfamily: Conoidea
- Family: Mangeliidae
- Genus: Mangelia
- Species: M. vacavillensis

Binomial name
- Mangelia vacavillensis Bryant and Palmer 1923

Synonyms
- † Mangilia vacavillensis Bryant and Palmer 1923 (original combination)

Species of gastropod

Mangelia vacavillensis is a minute extinct species of sea snail, a marine gastropod mollusk in the family Mangeliidae.

== Description ==
The length of the shell attains 4.7 mm, its diameter is 2.3 mm.

== Distribution ==
This extinct marine species was found in Middle Eocene strata in California.
