= Mangelia tenuicostata =

Scientific classification
- Kingdom: Animalia
- Phylum: Mollusca
- Class: Gastropoda
- Subclass: Caenogastropoda
- Order: Neogastropoda
- Superfamily: Conoidea
- Family: Mangeliidae
- Genus: Mangelia
- Species: M. tenuicostata

Binomial name
- Mangelia tenuicostata Brugnone, 1862

Synonyms
- Pleurotoma attenuatum var. tenuicosta Brugnone, 1862

Species of gastropod

Mangelia tenuicostata is a species of sea snail, a marine gastropod mollusk in the family Mangeliidae.

== Description ==
The length of the shell attains 7 mm.

== Distribution ==
This species occurs in European waters, the Mediterranean Sea and in the Atlantic Ocean off the Cape Verdes and West Africa.

Fossils have been found in the Plaisancien strata of Orciano, Italy.
