= Mangelia cibori =

Scientific classification
- Kingdom: Animalia
- Phylum: Mollusca
- Class: Gastropoda
- Subclass: Caenogastropoda
- Order: Neogastropoda
- Superfamily: Conoidea
- Family: Mangeliidae
- Genus: Mangelia
- Species: M. cibori

Binomial name
- Mangelia cibori Bałuk, Wacław, 2003

Synonyms
- † Cythara (Mangelia) cibori Bałuk, Wacław, 2003

Extinct species of gastropod

Mangelia cibori is an extinct species of sea snail, a marine gastropod mollusk in the family Mangeliidae.

== Description ==
The length of the shell attains 6.4 mm, its diameter is 2.5 mm.

== Distribution ==
This extinct marine species was found in Middle Miocene strata in Poland.
