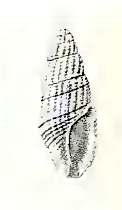
- Original image of a shell of Mangelia exasperata

Scientific classification
- Kingdom: Animalia
- Phylum: Mollusca
- Class: Gastropoda
- Subclass: Caenogastropoda
- Order: Neogastropoda
- Superfamily: Conoidea
- Family: Mangeliidae
- Genus: Mangelia
- Species: M. exasperata

Binomial name
- Mangelia exasperata H.B. Preston, 1908

Synonyms
- Mangilia exasperata H.B. Preston, 1908 (original description)

= Mangelia exasperata =

Species of gastropod

Mangelia exasperata is a species of sea snail, a marine gastropod mollusk in the family Mangeliidae.

== Description ==
The length of the shell attains 16.25 mm, its diameter 5.5 mm.

Original description: The shell has a fusiform shape. It is pale brown, narrowly banded with a deeper shade of the same colour. The shell contains 9 whorls, angular and convex. The first two are smooth, horny, polished, the remaining seven sculptured with coarse, transverse, varicose ridges, crossed by spiral lirae between which appear numerous fine striae. The sutures are impressed. The aperture is elongate. The outer lip is varicosely thickened.

== Distribution ==
This marine species occurs off the Andaman Islands
