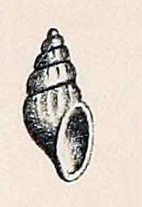
- Original image of a shell of Mangelia micropleura

Scientific classification
- Kingdom: Animalia
- Phylum: Mollusca
- Class: Gastropoda
- Subclass: Caenogastropoda
- Order: Neogastropoda
- Superfamily: Conoidea
- Family: Mangeliidae
- Genus: Mangelia
- Species: M. micropleura

Binomial name
- Mangelia micropleura R.J.L. Guppy, 1867

= Mangelia micropleura =

Species of gastropod

Mangelia micropleura is a minute extinct species of sea snail, a marine gastropod mollusk in the family Mangeliidae.

== Distribution ==
This extinct marine species was found in Pliocene strata of Trinidad.
