= Mangelia perrisi =

Scientific classification
- Kingdom: Animalia
- Phylum: Mollusca
- Class: Gastropoda
- Subclass: Caenogastropoda
- Order: Neogastropoda
- Superfamily: Conoidea
- Family: Mangeliidae
- Genus: Mangelia
- Species: M. perrisi

Binomial name
- Mangelia perrisi É.A. Benoist in M.A. Peyrot, 1931

Synonyms
- † Pleurotomoides perrisi É.A. Benoist in M.A. Peyrot, 1931

Species of gastropod

Mangelia perrisi is an extinct species of minute sea snail, a marine gastropod mollusk in the family Mangeliidae.

== Description ==
The length of the shell attains 30 mm.

== Distribution ==
This extinct marine species was found in the Middle Miocene strata of Aquitaine, France.
