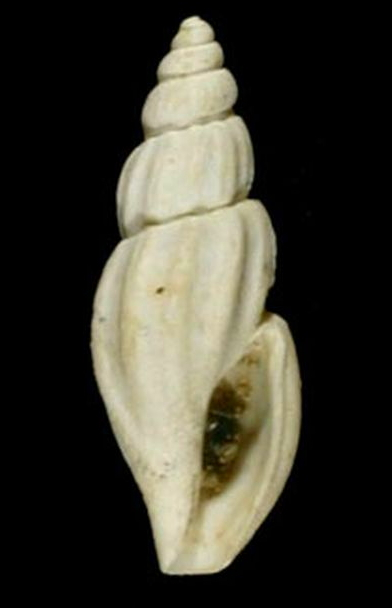
- Shell of Mangelia vandewouweri (specimen at the Natural History Museum, Rotterdam)

Scientific classification
- Kingdom: Animalia
- Phylum: Mollusca
- Class: Gastropoda
- Subclass: Caenogastropoda
- Order: Neogastropoda
- Superfamily: Conoidea
- Family: Mangeliidae
- Genus: Mangelia
- Species: M. vandewouweri

Binomial name
- Mangelia vandewouweri (M. Glibert, 1960 )

= Mangelia vandewouweri =

Species of gastropod

Mangelia vandewouweri is a minute extinct species of sea snail, a marine gastropod mollusk in the family Mangeliidae.

== Description ==
The length of the shell attains 5 mm.

== Distribution ==
This extinct marine species was found in Pliocene strata in Belgium.
