= Mangelia melitensis =

Scientific classification
- Kingdom: Animalia
- Phylum: Mollusca
- Class: Gastropoda
- Subclass: Caenogastropoda
- Order: Neogastropoda
- Superfamily: Conoidea
- Family: Mangeliidae
- Genus: Mangelia
- Species: M. melitensis

Binomial name
- Mangelia melitensis Cahcia & Misfud, 2008

Species of gastropod

Mangelia melitensis is a species of sea snail, a marine gastropod mollusk in the family Mangeliidae.

== Description ==
The length of the shell varies between 4 mm and 6.1 mm.

== Distribution ==
This species occurs in the Mediterranean Sea off Malta.
