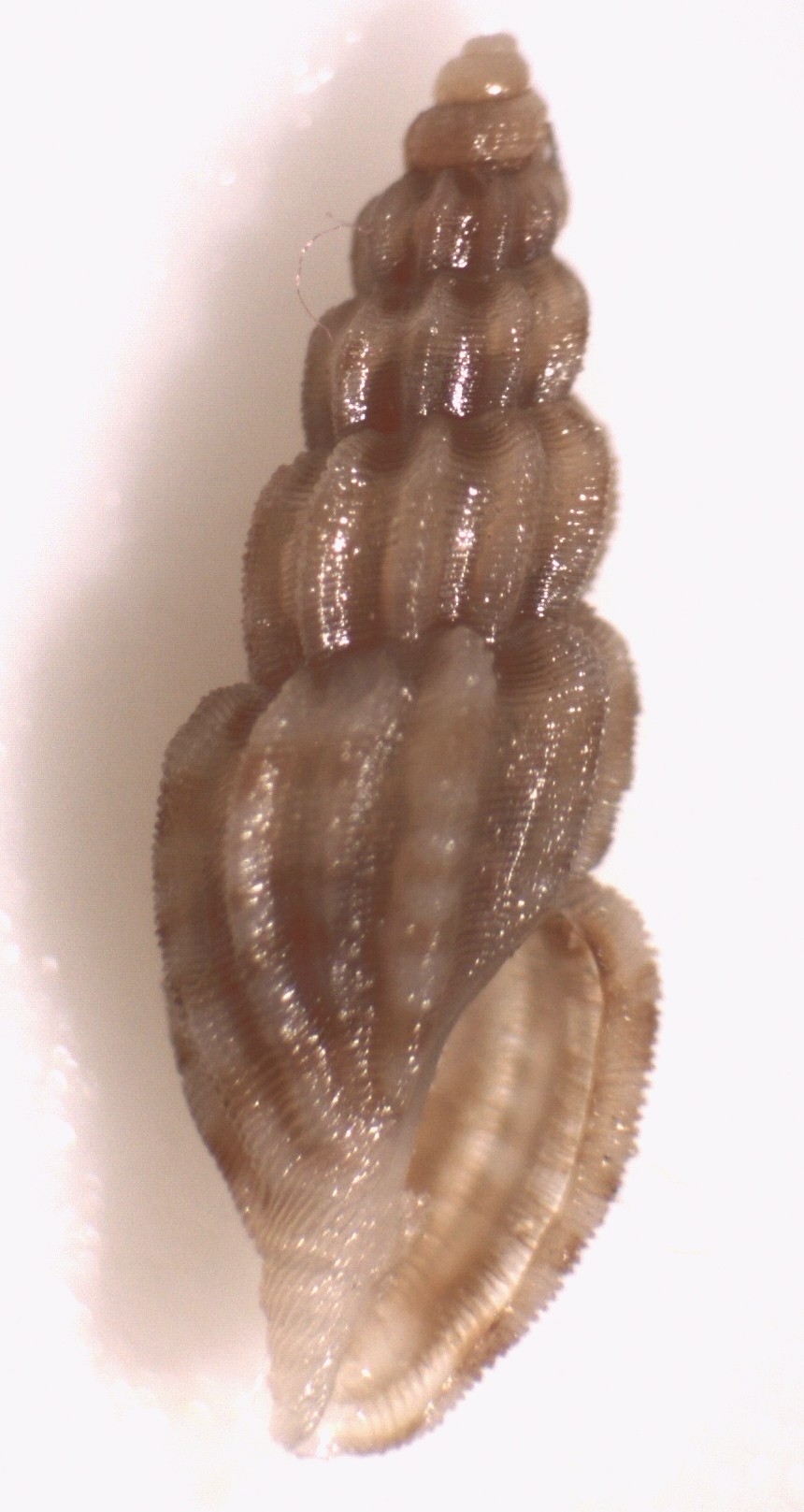
- Mangelia multilineolata

Scientific classification
- Kingdom: Animalia
- Phylum: Mollusca
- Class: Gastropoda
- Subclass: Caenogastropoda
- Order: Neogastropoda
- Superfamily: Conoidea
- Family: Mangeliidae
- Genus: Mangelia; Risso, 1826

Type species
- Mangelia striolata Risso, 1826

Species
- See text

Synonyms
- Cyrtocythara F. Nordsieck, 1977; Cythara (Cytharella) Monterosato, 1875; Cytharella Monterosato, 1875; Lyromangelia F. Nordsieck, 1977; Mangelia (Cytharella) Monterosato, 1875; Mangelia (Mangelia) Risso, 1826; Mangelia (Smithiella) Monterosato, 1890; Mangilia Lovén, 1846; Mangiliella Bucquoy, Dautzenberg & Dollfus, 1883; Pleurotoma (Mangelia); Pleurotoma (Mangilia); Rissomangelia Monterosato, 1917; Rugocythara Nordsieck, 1977; Smithia Monterosato, 1884 (Invalid: junior homonym of Smithia Milne-Edwards & Haime, 1851 [Cnidaria]; Smithiella is a replacement name); Smithiella Monterosato, 1890; Vielliersia Monterosato, 1884 (incorrect original spelling); Villiersia Monterosato, 1884 (Invalid: junior homonym of Villiersia d'Orbigny, 1837; Villiersiella is a replacement name); Villiersiella Monterosato, 1890

= Mangelia =

Genus of gastropods

Mangelia is a large genus of sea snails, marine gastropod mollusks in the family Mangeliidae.

The genus has been used for a long time as a wastebasket taxon. There have been many described species, many of which have become synonyms. Among the remaining accepted names a good number are still in doubt and are little known. They are only tentatively placed within the genus Mangelia.

This genus was named Mangelia by Leach and accepted by Risso in 1826. Later, some authors, such as Lovén in 1846, spelled it inadvertently as Mangilia, to honor the Italian malacologist Giuseppe Mangili (1767-1829). This had led to some confusion.

== Description ==
The shell has a fusiform shape. It is mostly longitudinally ribbed The spire is elongated, turriculated, acuminated. The lip is very finely rugosely denticulated. The lip is thickened and slightly sinuated at the upper part. The siphonal canal is short, more or less truncated. The columella is smooth. The sinus is near the suture. There is no operculum.

The genus Mangelia used to be defined by a multispiral protoconch, contrary to the genus Mangeliella Bucquoy, Dautzenberg & Dollfus, 1883 which was defined by a paucispiral protoconch. In 2011 the genus Mangeliella has been recognized as a synonym of Mangelia.

== Species ==
Species within the genus Mangelia include:

- † Mangelia acuticostata P. Nyst, 1836
- Mangelia adansoni (Knudsen, 1952)
- Mangelia ahuiri Cossignani & Ardovini, 2011
- Mangelia albaecostulis Bozzetti, 2020
- Mangelia albicincta A.A. Gould, 1860
- Mangelia albilonga Rolan & Otero-Schmitt, 1999
- Mangelia albolabiata E.A. Smith, 1882
- Mangelia algarvensis Spada, 2023
- Mangelia amatula W. H. Dall, 1919
- † Mangelia ambigua (Brugnone, 1862)
- Mangelia andamanensis H.B. Preston, 1908
- † Mangelia andersoni Wienrich & Janssen, 2007
- Mangelia androyensis Bozzetti, 2009
- Mangelia angolensis Thiele, 1925
- † Mangelia angulicosta Scarponi, Della Bella, Dell'Angelo, Huntley & Sosso, 2016
- † Mangelia anthetika J. Gardner, 1947
- † Mangelia asteria J. Gardner, 1947
- † Mangelia atlantica Pallary, 1912
- Mangelia attenuata (Montagu, 1803)
- Mangelia barashi (van Aartsen & Fehr-de Wal, 1978)
- † Mangelia barbadoides J. Gardner, 1938
- Mangelia beduina K.H.J. Thiele, 1925
- † Mangelia biondi (L.M.D. Bellardi, 1877)
- Mangelia boschi C.H. Oostingh, 1935
- † Mangelia branneri (R. Arnold, 1903)
- Mangelia brunnea Bozzetti, 2020
- Mangelia brusinae van Aartsen & Fehr-de Wal, 1978
- † Mangelia burgersae Landau, Van Dingenen & Ceulemans, 2020
- Mangelia caelata (R.B. Hinds, 1843)
- Mangelia callicredemna J.C. Melvill, 1917
- Mangelia callosa (Nordsieck, 1977)
- Mangelia carinata Bozzetti, 2009
- Mangelia carlottae (Dall, 1919)
- † Mangelia ceddensis Della Bella & Scarponi, 2010
- Mangelia ceroplasta (Bush, 1885)
- Mangelia cesta W. H. Dall, 1919
- † Mangelia chainei Peyrot, 1931
- † Mangelia chariessa J. Gardner, 1938
- † Mangelia china F.S. MacNeil, 1960
- Mangelia christina W. H. Dall, 1927
- † Mangelia cibori Bałuk W., 2003
- Mangelia cingulata (H. Strebel, 1908)
- Mangelia coarctata (Forbes, 1840)
- Mangelia colombi R.P.J. Hervier, 1897
- † Mangelia compsacosta J. Gardner, 1937
- Mangelia concinna A.A. Gould, 1860
- Mangelia congoensis Thiele, 1925
- † Mangelia coplicata Pezant, 1905
- Mangelia costata (Pennant, 1777)
- † Mangelia costellaria P. Nyst, 1836
- Mangelia costulata Risso, 1826
- Mangelia crebricostata Carpenter, 1864
- † Mangelia cryptopleura J. Gardner, 1937
- Mangelia decaryi P. Dautzenberg, 1932
- Mangelia decipiens E. A. Smith, 1888
- Mangelia dejanira W. H. Dall, 1919
- Mangelia densilineata (W. H. Dall, 1921)
- Mangelia diatula R.P.J. Hervier, 1897
- Mangelia difficilis (Locard & Caziot, 1900)
- Mangelia digressa Rolan & Otero-Schmitt, 1999
- Mangelia dina P. Bartsch, 1915
- Mangelia dobsoni A.W. Grabau & S.G. King, 1928
- Mangelia dorsuosa (A.A. Gould, 1860)
- † Mangelia dubia F.W. Harmer, 1919
- Mangelia dunkeri Kuroda, 1961
- † Mangelia ecuadoriana H.A. Pilsbry & A.A. Olsson, 1941
- Mangelia edentula O. Böttger, 1895
- † Mangelia elegantissima E.W. Vredenburg, 1921
- † Mangelia elevata W.M. Gabb, 1873
- Mangelia erminiana (L.G. Hertlein & A.M. Strong, 1951)
- Mangelia erymna J.C. Melvill, 1917
- Mangelia eucosmia P. Bartsch, 1915 (taxon inquirendum)
- Mangelia exasperata H.B. Preston, 1908
- Mangelia exigua K.H.J. Thiele, 1925
- Mangelia exstans K.H. Barnard, 1958
- Mangelia farina (F. Nordsieck, 1977) (nomen dubium)
- Mangelia fieldeni (van Aartsen & Fehr-de Wal, 1978)
- Mangelia finterae G.B. III Sowerby, 1894
- Mangelia forcellii Bozzetti, 2014
- Mangelia fordii E.A. Smith, 1888
- † Mangelia frumentum (Brugnone, 1874)
- † Mangelia gardnerae W.C. Mansfield, 1930
- Mangelia gazellae (Strebel, 1905)
- Mangelia gemmula W.H. Turton, 1932
- † Mangelia gouetensis A.E.M. Cossmann, 1898
- Mangelia grisea (F. Nordsieck, 1977) (nomen dubium)
- † Mangelia guerichi F. Kautsky, 1925
- Mangelia halitropis Dall, 1889
- † Mangelia hancocki L.G. Hertlein & A.M. Strong, 1939
- Mangelia hanna K.H.J. Thiele, 1925
- Mangelia hecetae W.H. Dall & P. Bartsch, 1910
- Mangelia helga P. Bartsch, 1915
- † Mangelia heptapleura H.A. Pilsbry & A.A. Olsson, 1941
- † Mangelia hesperia H.A. Pilsbry & A.A. Olsson, 1941
- Mangelia hiradoensis (Makiyama, 1927)
- † Mangelia hontensis M. Csepreghy, 1953
- † Mangelia hooveri R. Arnold, 1903
- Mangelia horneana E.A. Smith, 1884
- † Mangelia hyemalis (Mabille & Rochebrune, 1889)
- Mangelia imitatrix Della Bella & Scarponi, 2010
- Mangelia indistincta (Monterosato, 1875)
- † Mangelia interrupta Della Bella & Scarponi, 2010
- Mangelia inusitata Rolan & Otero-Schmitt, 1999
- † Mangelia isabellae C.J. Maury, 1910
- Mangelia isodoma R.P.J. Hervier, 1897
- Mangelia jerbaensis (Della Bella & Spada in Chirli, 1997)
- † Mangelia klimakota J. Gardner, 1937
- Mangelia kowiensis W.H. Turton, 1932
- Mangelia kraussi W.H. Turton, 1932
- † Mangelia labratula A.E.M. Cossmann, 1889
- † Mangelia lalonis C.J. Maury, 1917
- † Mangelia larga Scarponi, Della Bella, Dell'Angelo, Huntley & Sosso, 2016
- Mangelia lastica Dall, 1927
- Mangelia leuca J. Bush, 1893
- † Mangelia limata A.A. Olsson, 1922
- Mangelia lineorosata Rolan & Otero-Schmitt, 1999
- † Mangelia lissa J. Gardner, 1937
- Mangelia loraeformis Dall, 1927
- Mangelia louisa W.H. Dall, 1919
- Mangelia louisensis G.B. Sowerby III, 1894
- Mangelia luctuosa D'Orbigny, 1845
- † Mangelia luellingensis Wienrich & Janssen, 2007
- Mangelia lutea A.A. Gould, 1860
- Mangelia maculata (L.A. Reeve, 1846)
- Mangelia mangeri H.B. Preston, 1905
- † Mangelia maoica C.J. Maury, 1917
- Mangelia martensi (Strebel, 1905)
- Mangelia mediofasciata Maltzan, 1883
- Mangelia melitensis Cahcia & Misfud, 2008
- Mangelia mica (Philippi, 1849)
- Mangelia michaelseni (Strebel, 1905)
- † Mangelia micropleura R.J.L. Guppy, 1867
- Mangelia minuscula (E. A. Smith, 1910)
- † Mangelia miorugulosa F. Kautsky, 1925
- † Mangelia miostriolata (Nordsieck, 1972)
- Mangelia muiri K.H. Barnard, 1958
- Mangelia multilineolata (Deshayes, 1835)
- Mangelia munda (E.A. Smith, 1888)
- Mangelia myrmecodes J.C. Melvill & R. Standen, 1901
- Mangelia neapolitana S. Delle Chiaje, 1841
- Mangelia nisga P. Bartsch, 1915
- † Mangelia nivea Della Bella & Scarponi, 2010
- † Mangelia odovychenae Scarponi, Della Bella, Dell'Angelo, Huntley & Sosso, 2016
- Mangelia olivieriana J.C. Melvill, 1917
- Mangelia opulenta Thiele, 1925
- Mangelia orophoma J.C. Melvill & R. Standen, 1896
- Mangelia ossea (Nordsieck, 1968)
- † Mangelia ovata Della Bella & Scarponi, 2010
- Mangelia paciniana (Calcara, 1839)
- Mangelia paessleri (Strebel, 1905)
- † Mangelia painei Arnold, 1903
- Mangelia pallaryi (Nordsieck, 1977)
- † Mangelia parisiensis Cossmann, 1889
- Mangelia patagoniensis W.H. Dall, 1919
- † Mangelia paulae O. Böttger, 1901
- Mangelia payraudeauti (Deshayes, 1835)
- Mangelia perattenuata (Dall, 1905)
- † Mangelia perforata (Brusina, 1877)
- Mangelia perligera K.H.J. Thiele, 1925
- Mangelia perminima W.H. Turton, 1932
- † Mangelia perpulchra (S.V. Wood, 1848)
- † Mangelia perrisi É.A. Benoist in M.A. Peyrot, 1931
- Mangelia phoxos K.H. Barnard, 1958
- † Mangelia phrixae J. Gardner, 1937
- † Mangelia pivetaui Chavan, 1945
- Mangelia pomara W.H. Dall, 1919
- Mangelia pontica Milaschewitsch, 1908
- Mangelia pontyi (Dautzenberg, 1910)
- Mangelia posidonia J.C. Melvill, 1904
- Mangelia pseudoattenuata Ardovini, 2004
- † Mangelia pseudocordieri M.A. Peyrot, 1932
- † Mangelia pseudorugulosa Scarponi, Della Bella, Dell'Angelo, Huntley & Sosso, 2016
- Mangelia pulchrior (Dall, 1921)
- † Mangelia pyrgota J. Gardner, 1937
- Mangelia rhabdea Dall, 1927
- Mangelia robusticostata (E.A. Smith, 1879)
- Mangelia sagena (Dall, 1927)
- † Mangelia sallespissensis M.A. Peyrot, 1932
- Mangelia sandrii (Brusina, 1865)
- Mangelia scabra J.G. Jeffreys, 1847
- Mangelia scabrida Monterosato, 1890
- † Mangelia scalaria (Cristofori & Jan 1832)
- Mangelia sciola K.H. Barnard, 1958
- Mangelia sculpturata (Dall, 1887)
- Mangelia secreta (van Aartsen & Fehr-de Wal, 1978)
- Mangelia semen L.A. Reeve, 1846
- Mangelia semiassa A.A. Gould, 1860
- † Mangelia semicostulata G.P. Deshayes, 1865
- Mangelia senegalensis (Von Maltzan, 1883)
- Mangelia serrula K.H. Barnard, 1964
- † Mangelia sextoni J. Gardner, 1937
- Mangelia shepstonensis E.A. Smith, 1914
- Mangelia sicula Reeve, 1846
- † Mangelia spadiana Della Bella & Scarponi, 2010
- Mangelia stibarochila J.C. Melvill & R. Standen, 1896
- Mangelia stosiciana Brusina, 1869
- † Mangelia stoutjesdijki Schnetler & M. S. Nielsen, 2018
- Mangelia striolata Risso, 1826
- Mangelia striolatoides Sabelli & Spada, 2023
- † Mangelia stypteria J. Gardner, 1937
- Mangelia subaustralis H.H. Suter, 1899
- Mangelia subcircularis Dall, 1927
- † Mangelia subcostellata G.P. Deshayes, 1865
- Mangelia subgracilenta S. Nomura, 1940
- Mangelia subsida (Dall, 1881)
- Mangelia sulcosa (G.B. Sowerby I, 1832)
- Mangelia taeniata (Deshayes, 1835)
- Mangelia tanabensis J.C. Melvill, 1923
- Mangelia tanzaniana Bozzetti, 2020
- † Mangelia teirata J. Gardner, 1937
- Mangelia tenuicostata Brugnone, 1868
- Mangelia tenuisculpta Spada, 2023
- Mangelia terpnisma J.C. Melvill & R. Standen, 1901
- Mangelia thepalea J.C. Melvill & R. Standen, 1896
- Mangelia theskeloides J.C. Melvill & R. Standen, 1899
- Mangelia toreumata (W.H. Dall, 1889)
- Mangelia tranquilla K.H. Barnard, 1958
- Mangelia tritaeniata J.C. Melvill, 1917
- Mangelia unifasciata (Deshayes, 1835)
- † Mangelia vacavillensis E.G. Bryant & K.V.W. Palmer, 1923
- † Mangelia vandewouweri (M. Glibert, 1960)
- Mangelia vauquelini (Payraudeau, 1826)
- Mangelia verrucosa G.B. Sowerby III, 1897
- Mangelia vesta K.H.J. Thiele, 1925
- Mangelia victoriana W.H. Dall, 1897
- Mangelia vitrea Nomura & Zinbo, 1940
- Mangelia vulgata K.H.J. Thiele, 1925
- Mangelia woodwardiae J.C. Melvill, 1917

== Species brought into synonymy ==
Extended list of synonyms
- Mangelia abyssicola Reeve, 1846: synonym of Eucithara vittata (Hinds, 1843)
- Mangelia abyssorum (Locard, 1897): synonym of Gymnobela abyssorum (Locard, 1897)
- Mangelia adamantina Melvill, 1904: synonym of Raphitoma adamantina (J.C. Melvill, 1904)
- Mangelia africana G.B. III Sowerby, 1903: synonym of Citharomangelia africana (G.B. III Sowerby, 1903)
- Mangelia agna J.C. Melvill & R. Standen, 1896: synonym of Pseudorhaphitoma agna (J.C. Melvill & R. Standen, 1896)
- Mangelia alaskensis Dall, 1871: synonym of Propebela alaskensis (Dall, 1871)
- Mangelia alba C. B. Adams, 1850: synonym of Brachycythara alba (C. B. Adams, 1850)
- Mangelia albivestis Pilsbry, 1934: synonym of Eucithara albivestis (Pilsbry, 1934)
- Mangelia albolabiata E.A. Smith, 1882: synonym of Mangelia albolabrata E.A. Smith, 1882
- Mangelia albolaqueata Carpenter, 1865: synonym of Calliclava albolaqueata (Carpenter, 1865)
- Mangelia albula Thiele, 1925: synonym of Pseudorhaphitoma albula (Thiele, 1925)
- Mangelia aleutica W.H. Dall, 1871: synonym of Oenopota aleutica (W.H. Dall, 1871)
- Mangelia alfredi E. A. Smith, 1904: synonym of Pseudorhaphitoma alfredi (E. A. Smith, 1904)
- Mangelia alma Thiele, 1925: synonym of Pseudorhaphitoma alma (Thiele, 1925)
- Mangelia altenai Brackman, 1938: synonym of Mangelia costulata Risso, 1826
- Mangelia althorpi W.H. Dall, 1919: synonym of Oenopota althorpi (W.H. Dall, 1919)
- Mangelia amplexa A.A. Gould, 1860: synonym of Guraleus amplexus (A.A. Gould, 1860)
- Mangelia angelinae A. Cecalupo & P. Quadri, 1996: synonym of Mangelia fieldeni (J.J. Van Aartsen & M.C. Fehr-de Wal, 1978)
- Mangelia angulata Reeve, 1846: synonym of Leiocithara angulata (Reeve, 1846)
- Mangelia angulosa E. A. Smith, 1872: synonym of Anacithara angulosa (E. A. Smith, 1872)
- †Mangelia angusta (G. Jan, 1842): synonym of †Agathotoma angusta (Bellardi, 1847)
- Mangelia anna Jousseaume, 1883: synonym of Eucithara novaehollandiae (Reeve, 1846)
- Mangelia anomala (Angas, 1877): synonym of Macteola anomala (G.F. Angas, 1877)
- Mangelia antarctica Martens & Pfeffer, 1886: synonym of Falsimohnia albozonata (Watson, 1886)
- Mangelia antillarum Reeve, 1846: synonym of Eucithara antillarum (Reeve, 1846)
- Mangelia antiochroa Pilsbry & Lowe, 1932: synonym of Kurtziella antiochroa (Pilsbry & Lowe, 1932)
- Mangelia antipyrgus Pilsbry & Lowe, 1932: synonym of Kurtziella antipyrgus (Pilsbry & Lowe, 1932)
- Mangelia antonia (Dall, 1881): synonym of Benthomangelia antonia (Dall, 1881)
- Mangelia anxia Hedley, 1909: synonym of Kermia edychroa (Hervier, 1897): synonym of Exomilus edychrous (Hervier, 1897)
- †Mangelia appeliusi Bellardi, 1877: synonym of †Bela pseudoappeliusi Naldi, Della Bella & Scarponi, 2013
- Mangelia arteaga W.H. Dall & P. Bartsch, 1910: synonym of Kurtzia arteaga (W.H. Dall & P. Bartsch, 1910)
- Mangelia atkinsoni Tenison-Woods, 1876: synonym of Anachis atkinsoni (Tenison-Woods, 1876)
- Mangelia atra F. Nordsieck, 1977: synonym of Mangelia unifasciata (G.P. Deshayes, 1835)
- Mangelia aurea T.A. de M. Monterosato, 1884: synonym of Mangelia unifasciata (G.P. Deshayes, 1835)
- Mangelia aurea G.A. Brugnone, 1868: synonym of Mangelia unifasciata (G.P. Deshayes, 1835)
- Mangelia aurea F. Nordsieck, 1972: synonym of Mangelia unifasciata (G.P. Deshayes, 1835)
- Mangelia balteata Reeve, 1846: synonym of Pyrgocythara balteata (Reeve, 1846): synonym of Ithycythara lanceolata (C. B. Adams, 1850)
- Mangelia bandella (Dall, 1881): synonym of Benthomangelia bandella (Dall, 1881)
- Mangelia barbarensis I.M. Oldroyd, 1924: synonym of Kurtziella plumbea (R.B. Hinds, 1843)
- Mangelia bascauda J.C. Melvill & R. Standen, 1896: synonym of Eucithara bascauda (J.C. Melvill & R. Standen, 1896)
- Mangelia bertrandii (Payraudeau, 1826): synonym of Mangelia striolata Risso, 1826
- Mangelia bicolor Reeve, 1846: synonym of Eucithara bicolor (Reeve, 1846)
- Mangelia biconica C. B. Adams, 1850: synonym of Brachycythara biconica (C. B. Adams, 1850)
- Mangelia bivonae C. Maravigna, 1840: synonym of Mangelia multilineolata (Deshayes, 1835)
- Mangelia bivoniana C. Maravigna, 1853: synonym of Mangelia multilineolata (Deshayes, 1835)
- Mangelia boakei Tryon, 1884: synonym of Citharomangelia boakei (Nevill & Nevill, 1869)
- Mangelia brevis C. B. Adams, 1850: synonym of Brachycythara brevis (C. B. Adams, 1850)
- Mangelia burchi L.G. Hertlein & A.M. Strong, 1951: synonym of Tenaturris verdensis (W.H. Dall, 1919)
- Mangelia caerulans (Philippi, 1844): synonym of Mangelia striolata Risso, 1826
- Mangelia calcata Hedley, 1909: synonym of Pseudorhaphitoma calcata (Hedley, 1909)
- Mangelia caledonica Smith, 1882: synonym of Eucithara caledonica (E.A. Smith, 1882)
- Mangelia capillacea Reeve, 1846: synonym of Eucithara coronata (Hinds, 1843)
- Mangelia castanea Reeve, 1846: synonym of Eucithara castanea (Reeve, 1846)
- Mangelia cavernosa Angas (not Reeve), 1865: synonym of Etrema paucimaculata (Angas, 1880)
- Mangelia celebensis Hinds, 1843: synonym of Eucithara celebensis (Hinds, 1843)
- Mangelia cerina (Kurtz & Stimpson, 1851): synonym of Kurtziella cerina (Kurtz & Stimpson, 1851)
- Mangelia cetolacea Dall, 1908: synonym of Glyptaesopus oldroydi (Arnold, 1903)
- Mangelia cincta Reeve, 1846: synonym of Eucithara cincta (Reeve, 1846)
- Mangelia cinnamomea Hinds, 1843: synonym of Eucithara cinnamomea (Hinds, 1843)
- Mangelia cithara Gould, 1849: synonym of Eucithara coronata (Hinds, 1843)
- Mangelia clavata G. B. Sowerby II, 1870: synonym of Clavus clavata (G. B. Sowerby II, 1870)
- Mangelia climakis (Watson, 1886): synonym of Belomitra quadruplex
- Mangelia cognata Thiele, 1925: synonym of Pseudorhaphitoma cognata (Thiele, 1925)
- Mangelia columbelloides Reeve, 1846: synonym of Eucithara columbelloides (Reeve, 1846)
- Mangelia companyoi Bucquoy, Dautzenberg & Dollfus, 1883: synonym of Mangelia unifasciata (Deshayes, 1835)
- Mangelia conata Hedley, 1909: synonym of Anacithara conata (Hedley, 1909)
- Mangelia coniformis Reeve, 1846: synonym of Eucithara coniformis (Reeve, 1846)
- Mangelia connectens Sowerby III, 1896: synonym of Guraleus cuspis (G. B. Sowerby III, 1896)
- Mangelia conohelicoides Reeve, 1846: synonym of Eucithara conohelicoides (Reeve, 1846)
- Mangelia contracta Brazier, 1876: synonym of Paraclathurella gracilenta (Reeve, 1843)
- Mangelia coppingeri (E.A. Smith, 1881): synonym of Savatieria coppingeri (E. A. Smith, 1881)
- Mangelia corallina R.B. Watson, 1881: synonym of Kurtziella serga (W.H. Dall, 1881)
- Mangelia coronata Hinds, 1843: synonym of Eucithara coronata (Hinds, 1843)
- Mangelia costulata Blainville, 1829: synonym of Mangelia costulata Risso, 1826
- Mangelia costulata R.W. Dunker, 1860: synonym of Mangelia dunkeri J.T. Kuroda, 1961
- Mangelia crassilabrum Reeve, 1846: synonym of Eucithara novaehollandiae (Reeve, 1846)
- Mangelia crenulata J.V. Carus, 1893: synonym of Mangelia stosiciana (Š. Brusina, 1869)
- Mangelia cyclophora von Martens, 1880: synonym of Otitoma cyclophora (Deshayes, 1863)
- Mangelia cylindrica Reeve, 1846: synonym of Gingicithara cylindrica (Reeve, 1846)
- Mangelia damleyensis Tryon, 1884: synonym of Pseudorhaphitoma darnleyi (Brazier, 1876)
- Mangelia delicatula Tenison-Woods, 1879: synonym of Guraleus delicatula (Tenison-Woods, 1879)
- Mangelia dempsta A.A. Gould, 1860: synonym of Raphitoma dempsta (A.A. Gould, 1860)
- Mangelia densegranosa Thiele, 1925: synonym of Paraclathurella densegranosa (Thiele, 1925)
- Mangelia densestriata C. B. Adams, 1850: synonym of Pyrgocythara densestriata (C. B. Adams, 1850)
- Mangelia derelicta Reeve, 1846: synonym of Mangelia unifasciata derelicta (Deshayes, 1835)
- Mangelia desalesii Tenison-Woods, 1876: synonym of Asperdaphne desalesii (Tenison-Woods, 1877)
- Mangelia descendens Martens, 1904: synonym of Strombina descendens (Martens, 1904)
- †Mangelia detmersiana O. Böttger, 1901: synonym of Mangelia perforata (Brusina, 1877)
- Mangelia devia Suter, 1908: synonym of Comptella devia (Suter, 1908)
- Mangelia difficilis É.A.A. Locard & E. Caziot, 1900: synonym of Mangelia unifasciata (G.P. Deshayes, 1835)
- Mangelia digitale Reeve, 1846: synonym of Kermia pumila (Mihels, 1845)
- Mangelia donovani J.E. Gray, 1847: synonym of Mangelia costata (T. Pennant, 1777)
- Mangelia dubia (C. B. Adams, 1845): synonym of Tenaturris dubia (C. B. Adams, 1845)
- Mangelia dysoni Reeve, 1846: synonym of Tenaturris dysoni (Reeve, 1846)
- Mangelia eburnea And. Bivona-Bernardi, 1838: synonym of Mangelia taeniata (G.P. Deshayes, 1835)
- Mangelia eburnea Sars M., 1859: synonym of Spirotropis confusa (Seguenza, 1880)
- Mangelia elata W.H. Dall, 1889: synonym of Platycythara elata (W.H. Dall, 1889)
- Mangelia elegans Reeve, 1846: synonym of Eucithara elegans (Reeve, 1846)
- Mangelia elegantissima (Melvill & Standen, 1903): synonym of Paraclathurella gracilenta (Reeve, 1843)
- Mangelia ella Thiele, 1925: synonym of Eucithara ella (Thiele, 1925)
- Mangelia elusiva (Dall, 1881): synonym of Pleurotomella elusiva (Dall, 1881)
- Mangelia emina Hedley, 1905: synonym of Paraguraleus emina (Hedley, 1905)
- Mangelia epicharis R. Sturany, 1903: synonym of Pseudodaphnella epicharis (Sturany, 1903)
- Mangelia eriopis W.H. Dall, 1919: synonym of Oenopota eriopis W.H. Dall, 1919
- Mangelia eriphyle (W.H. Dall, 1919): synonym of Crockerella eriphyle (Dall, 1919)
- Mangelia eumerista Melvill & Standen, 1896: synonym of Eucithara eumerista (J.C. Melvill & R. Standen, 1896)
- Mangelia euryclea W.H. Dall, 1919: synonym of Agathotoma alcippe (W.H. Dall, 1918)
- Mangelia evadne W.H. Dall, 1919: synonym of Crockerella evadne (Dall, 1919)
- Mangelia exigua H. von Maltzan, 1884: synonym of Mangelia exigua K.H.J. Thiele, 1925
- Mangelia exsculpta R.B. Watson, 1881: synonym of Belomitra pourtalesii (Dall, 1881)
- Mangelia fairbanki G. Nevill & H. Nevill, 1875: synonym of Pseudorhaphitoma fairbanki (G. Nevill & H. Nevill, 1875)
- Mangelia flavescens Angas, 1877: synonym of Guraleus flavescens (Angas, 1877)
- Mangilia fulgens E.A. Smith, 1888: synonym of Tenaturris fulgens (E.A. Smith, 1888)
- Mangelia fulvicans (Strebel, 1908): synonym of Falsimohnia fulvicans (Strebel, 1908)
- Mangelia funebris Reeve, 1846: synonym of Eucithara funebris (Reeve, 1846)
- Mangelia funiculata Reeve, 1846: synonym of Eucithara funiculata (Reeve, 1846)
- Mangelia fusca (C. B. Adams, 1845): synonym of Pyrgocythara cinctella (Pfeiffer, 1840)
- Mangelia fuscata (Deshayes, 1835): synonym of Bela fuscata (Deshayes, 1835)
- Mangelia fuscescens Thiele, 1925: synonym of Pseudorhaphitoma fuscescens (Thiele, 1925)
- Mangelia fuscoligata Carpenter, 1856: synonym of Pyrgocythara fuscoligata (Carpenter, 1856)
- Mangelia fusiformis Reeve, 1846: synonym of Eucithara fusiformis (Reeve, 1846)
- Mangelia gibbosa Reeve, 1846: synonym of Eucithara gibbosa (Reeve, 1846)
- Mangelia ginnania Risso, 1826: synonym of Haedropleura septangularis (Montagu, 1803)
- Mangelia gisna P. Bartsch, 1915: synonym of Mangelia minuscula (E. A. Smith, 1910)
- Mangelia glareosa A.A. Gould, 1860: synonym of Cythara glareosa (A.A. Gould, 1860)
- Mangelia glypta Bush, 1885: synonym of Nassarina glypta (Bush, 1885)
- Mangelia goodalliana Leach, 1852: synonym of Mangelia unifasciata (Deshayes, 1835)
- Mangelia goodallii Reeve, 1846: synonym of Mangelia unifasciata (Deshayes, 1835)
- Mangelia gracilenta Brazier, 1876: synonym of Paraclathurella gracilenta (Reeve, 1843)
- Mangelia gracilis Reeve, 1846: synonym of Eucithara gracilis (Reeve, 1846)
- Mangelia granitica W.H. Dall, 1919: synonym of Oenopota granitica (W.H. Dall, 1919)
- Mangelia granulossisima Hedley, 1903: synonym of Guraleus granulossisimus Tennison-Woods, 1878
- Mangelia hamata Carpenter, 1865: synonym of Pyrgocythara hamata (Carpenter, 1865)
- Mangelia harrisoni Tenison-Woods, 1878: synonym of Daphnella harrisoni (Tenison-Woods, 1878)
- Mangelia harrisoni Tenison-Woods, 1877: synonym of Parviterebra brazieri (Angas, 1875)
- Mangelia hexagona Gabb, 1865: synonym of Cytharella hexagona (Gabb, 1865)
- Mangelia hexagonalis Brazier, 1876: synonym of Pseudorhaphitoma hexagonalis (Reeve, 1845)
- Mangelia hilum Hedley, 1908: synonym of Austropusilla hilum (Hedley, 1908)
- Mangelia himerodes J.C. Melvill & R. Standen, 1896: synonym of Guraleus himerodes (J.C. Melvill & R. Standen, 1896)
- Mangelia holböllii Möller, 1842: synonym of Astyris rosacea (Gould, 1840)
- Mangelia hollboelli Møller, 1842: synonym of Astyris rosacea (Gould, 1840)
- Mangelia hornbeckii Reeve, 1846: synonym of Eucithara coronata (Hinds, 1843)
- Mangelia hukuiensis Nomura & Niino, 1940: synonym of Nannodiella hukuiensis (Nomura & Niino, 1940)
- Mangelia humerosa P. Bartsch, 1915: synonym of Guraleus amplexus (A.A. Gould, 1860)
- Mangelia immaculata Tenison-Woods, 1876: synonym of Paracuneus immaculatus (Tenison-Woods, 1876)
- Mangelia incerta Pritchard & Gatliff, 1906: synonym of Mitrithara incerta (Pritchard & Gatliff, 1906)
- Mangelia infanda W.H. Webster, 1906: synonym of Antiguraleus infandus (W.H. Webster, 1906)
- Mangelia infulata Hedley, 1909: synonym of Leiocithara infulata (Hedley, 1909)
- Mangelia innocens Thiele, 1925: synonym of Benthomangelia antonia (Dall, 1881)
- Mangelia inornata Sowerby III, 1896: synonym of Marita inornata (G.B. III Sowerby, 1896)
- Mangelia insculpta Adams & Angas, 1864: synonym of Marita insculpta (Adams & Angas, 1864)
- Mangelia intaminata Gould, 1860: synonym of Pseudodaphnella intaminata (Gould, 1860)
- Mangelia intercedens Melvill, 1923: synonym of Daphnella intercedens (Melvill, 1923)
- Mangelia interfossa Carpenter, 1864: synonym of Perimangelia interfossa (Carpenter, 1864)
- Mangelia interlineata W. Kobelt, 1905: synonym of Mangelia multilineolata (Deshayes, 1835)
- Mangelia interlirata Stearns, 1872: synonym of Perimangelia interfossa (Carpenter, 1864)
- Mangelia intermedia And. Bivona-Bernardi, 1838: synonym of Bela powisiana (P. Dautzenberg, 1887)
- Mangelia interrupta Reeve, 1846: synonym of Macteola interrupta (Reeve, 1846)
- Mangelia jacksonensis Angas, 1877: synonym of Guraleus jacksonensis (Angas, 1877)
- Mangelia janira (Dall, 1919): synonym of Tenaturris janira (Dall, 1919)
- Mangelia kieneri C. Maravigna, 1840: synonym of Mangelia sicula L.A. Reeve, 1846
- Mangelia kochi P.M. Pallary, 1904: synonym of Mangelia pallaryi (Nordsieck, 1977)
- Mangelia labecula Gould, 1862: synonym of Astyris labecula Gould, 1862
- Mangelia laevigata T.A. de M. Monterosato, 1884: synonym of Bela powisiana (P. Dautzenberg, 1887)
- Mangelia lallemantiana Angas, 1877: synonym of Guraleus lallemantianus (Crosse & Fischer, 1865)
- Mangelia lamellata Reeve, 1846: synonym of Eucithara lamellata (Reeve, 1846)
- Mangelia lanceolata C. B. Adams, 1850: synonym of Ithycythara lanceolata (C. B. Adams, 1850)
- Mangelia latirella J.C. Melvill & R. Standen, 1896: synonym of Glyphostoma latirella (Melvill, J.C. & R. Standen, 1897, "1896")
- Mangelia letoumeuxiana Angas, 1867: synonym of Turrella letourneuxiana (Crosse & Fischer, 1865)
- Mangelia levidensis Carpenter, 1864: synonym of Oenopota levidensis (Carpenter, 1864)
- Mangelia linearis (Montagu, 1803): synonym of Raphitoma linearis (Montagu, 1803)
- Mangelia lineata G.F. Angas, 1865: synonym of Guraleus pictus vincentinus (J.C.H. Crosse & P.H. Fischer, 1835)
- Mangelia lineatus T. Brown, 1827: synonym of Mangelia multilineolata (Deshayes, 1835)
- Mangelia lineolata Risso, 1826: synonym of Mangelia multilineolata (Deshayes, 1835) (treated by Spada et al. 2023 as nomen oblitum)
- Mangelia lischkei (Smith E. A., 1888): synonym of Leiocithara lischkei (E. A. Smith, 1888)
- Mangelia lutaria Hedley, 1907: synonym of Exomilus lutaria (Hedley, 1907)
- Mangelia lyra Reeve, 1846: synonym of Eucithara lyra (Reeve, 1846)
- Mangelia lyrica Reeve, 1846: synonym of Gingicithara lyrica (Reeve, 1846)
- Mangelia macrocephala Thiele, 1925: synonym of Leiocithara macrocephala (Thiele, 1925)
- Mangelia magellanica (Martens, 1881): synonym of Oenopota magellanica (Martens, 1881)
- Mangelia marginelloides Reeve, 1846: synonym of Eucithara marginelloides (Reeve, 1846)
- Mangelia melanitica (Dall in Dall & Simpson, 1901): synonym of Nannodiella vespuciana (d'Orbigny, 1847)
- Mangelia melanosticta Pilsbry & Lowe, 1932: synonym of Steironepion piperata (E. A. Smith, 1882)
- Mangelia mellissi E.A. Smith, 1890: synonym of Stellatoma mellissi (E.A. Smith, 1890)
- Mangelia meredithiae Tenison-Woods, 1876: synonym of Guraleus pictus (A. Adams & Angas, 1864)
- Mangelia merlini P. Dautzenberg, 1910: synonym of Agathotoma merlini (P. Dautzenberg, 1910)
- Mangelia mirabilis (P.M. Pallary, 1904): synonym of Mangelia pallaryi (Nordsieck, 1977)
- Mangelia misera Thiele, 1925: synonym of Pseudorhaphitoma alfredi (E. A. Smith, 1904)
- Mangelia monocingulata (Dall, 1889): synonym of Saccharoturris monocingulata (Dall, 1889)
- Mangelia munda H.H. Suter, 1909: synonym of Antiguraleus mundus (H.H. Suter, 1909)
- Mangelia muricoides C. B. Adams, 1850: synonym of Ithycythara muricoides (C. B. Adams, 1850)
- Mangelia musae Thiele, 1925: synonym of Leiocithara musae (Thiele, 1925)
- Mangelia nana Reeve, 1846: synonym of Eucithara nana (Reeve, 1846)
- Mangelia nanisca Hervier, 1897: synonym of Anacithara nanisca (Hervier, 1897)
- Mangelia nanodes J.C. Melvill, 1923: synonym of Brachycythara nanodes (J.C. Melvill, 1923)
- Mangelia nassoides Hedley, 1913: synonym of Bela nassoides J. Gardner, 1938
- Mangelia naufraga Hedley, 1909: synonym of Anacithara naufraga (Hedley, 1909)
- Mangelia nebula (Montagu, 1803): synonym of Bela nebula (Montagu, 1803)
- Mangelia neglecta C. B. Adams, 1852: synonym of Agathotoma neglecta (C. B. Adams, 1852)
- Mangelia nereis H.A. Pilsbry & H.N. Lowe, 1932: synonym of Tenaturris merita (R.B. Hinds, 1843)
- Mangelia nigropunctata Martens, 1885: synonym of Falsimohnia albozonata (Watson, 1886)
- Mangelia nitens Carpenter, 1864: synonym of Perimangelia nitens (Carpenter, 1864)
- Mangelia novaehollandiae Reeve, 1846: synonym of Eucithara novaehollandiae (Reeve, 1846)
- Mangelia nuperrima (Tiberi, 1855): synonym of Bela nuperrima (Tiberi, 1855)
- Mangelia obeliscus Reeve, 1846: synonym of Pseudorhaphitoma pyramis (Hinds, 1843)
- Mangelia obesa Reeve, 1846: synonym of Eucithara obesa (Reeve, 1846)
- Mangelia oldroydi R. Arnold, 1903: synonym of Glyptaesopus oldroydi (Arnold, 1903)
- Mangelia ordinaria (E.A. Smith, 1882): synonym of Agathotoma ordinaria (E.A. Smith, 1882)
- Mangelia ornata G.B. III Sowerby, 1896: synonym of Guraleus ornatus (G.B. III Sowerby, 1896)
- Mangelia ossea P.M. Pallary, 1920: synonym of Mangelia indistincta (Monterosato, 1875)
- Mangelia pacinii [sic]: synonym of Mangelia paciniana (Calcara, 1839)
- Mangelia padangensis Thiele, 1925: synonym of Paraclathurella padangensis (Thiele, 1925)
- Mangelia pallida Reeve, 1846: synonym of Eucithara coronata (Hinds, 1843)
- Mangelia parilis E.A. Smith, 1888: synonym of Agathotoma alcippe (W.H. Dall, 1918)
- Mangelia paschalis Thiele, 1925: synonym of Belomitra paschalis (Thiele, 1925)
- Mangelia paucicostata Risso, 1826: synonym of Mangelia striolata Risso, 1826
- Mangelia paucimaculata Sowerby, 1896: synonym of Etrema paucimaculata (Angas, 1880)
- Mangelia paciniana É.A.A. Locard & E. Caziot, 1900: synonym of Mangelia paciniana (Calcara, 1839)
- Mangelia paula Thiele, 1925: synonym of Pseudorhaphitoma paula (Thiele, 1925)
- Mangelia payraudeaui G.P. Deshayes, 1835: synonym of Mangelia payraudeauti (Deshayes, 1835)
- Mangelia pelagia (Dall, 1881): synonym of Leucosyrinx pelagia (Dall, 1881)
- Mangelia pellucida Reeve, 1846: synonym of Citharomangelia pellucida (Reeve, 1846)
- Mangelia perissa Hedley, 1909: synonym of Asperdaphne perissa (Hedley, 1909)
- Mangelia pertabulata R. Sturany, 1903: synonym of Clathurella pertabulata (Sturany, 1903)
- Mangelia pessulata Reeve, 1846: synonym of Gingicithara pessulata (Reeve, 1846)
- Mangelia phaethusa (Dall, 1919): synonym of Notocytharella phaethusa (Dall, 1919)
- Mangelia philippii H.C. Weinkauff, 1868: synonym of Mangelia sicula L.A. Reeve, 1846
- Mangelia picta Adams & Angas, 1864: synonym of Guraleus picta (Adams & Angas, 1864)
- Mangelia planilabrum Reeve, 1846: synonym of Lienardia planilabrum (Reeve, 1846)
- Mangelia plicatilis Risso, 1826: synonym of Bela plicatilis (Risso, 1826)
- Mangelia plicifera Schmidt, 1872: synonym of Oenopota harpa (Dall, 1885)
- Mangelia plicosa C. B. Adams, 1850: synonym of Pyrgocythara plicosa (C. B. Adams, 1850)
- Mangelia poli Delle Chiaje, 1830: synonym of Rissoina bruguieri (Payraudeau, 1826)
- Mangelia poliana Risso, 1826: synonym of Rissoina bruguieri (Payraudeau, 1826)
- Mangelia polita Š. Brusina, 1865: synonym of Bela powisiana (P. Dautzenberg, 1887)
- Mangelia ponderosa Reeve, 1846: synonym of Gingicithara ponderosa (Reeve, 1846)
- Mangelia pourtalesii W.H. Dall, 1881: synonym of Belomitra pourtalesii (Dall, 1881)
- Mangelia powisiana (Dautzenberg, 1887): synonym of Bela powisiana (Dautzenberg, 1887)
- Mangelia problematica Thiele, 1925: synonym of Belomitra problematica (Thiele, 1925)
- Mangelia psila Bush, 1885: synonym of Ithycythara psila (Bush, 1885)
- Mangelia pulchella Reeve, 1846: synonym of Eucithara pulchella (Reeve, 1846)
- Mangelia pupiformis (E. A. Smith, 1884): synonym of Ceritoturris pupiformis (E. A. Smith, 1884)
- Mangelia pura L.A. Reeve, 1846: synonym of Mangelia vauquelini (B.C.M. Payraudeau, 1826)
- Mangelia pura Gould, 1860: synonym of Hemidaphne gouldi Yen, 1944: synonym of Otitoma gouldi (Yen, 1944)
- Mangelia purissima (Strebel, 1908): synonym of Typhlodaphne purissima (Strebel, 1908)
- Mangelia pusilla A. Scacchi, 1836: synonym of Mangelia multilineolata (Deshayes, 1835)
- Mangelia pyramidalis Reeve, 1846: synonym of Pseudorhaphitoma pyramidalis (Reeve, 1846)
- Mangelia pyrrhula W.H. Dall, 1919: synonym of Agathotoma alcippe (W.H. Dall, 1918)
- Mangelia quadrata (Reeve, 1845): synonym of Glyphoturris quadrata (Reeve, 1845)
- Mangelia quadrata monocingulata W.H. Dall, 1889: synonym of Saccharoturris monocingulata (W.H. Dall, 1889)
- Mangelia quadrilineata (C. B. Adams, 1850): synonym of Cryoturris quadrilineata (C. B. Adams, 1850)
- Mangelia recta E.A. Smith, 1888: synonym of Pleurotoma antiope W.H. Dall, 1918
- Mangelia reeveana G.P. Deshayes: synonym of Mangelia indistincta (Monterosato, 1875)
- Mangelia reevei G.W. Tryon, 1884: synonym of Eucithara novaehollandiae (L.A. Reeve, 1846)
- Mangelia reticulata Reeve, 1846: synonym of Eucithara obesa (Reeve, 1846)
- Mangelia reticulata Risso, 1826: synonym of Rissoina bruguieri (Payraudeau, 1826)
- Mangelia rietensis W.H. Turton, 1932: synonym of Guraleus amplexus (Gould, 1860)
- Mangelia rigida Reeve, 1846: synonym of Haedropleura septangularis (Montagu, 1803)
- Mangelia rigorata Hedley, 1909: synonym of Heterocithara rigorata (Hedley, 1909)
- Mangelia rikuzenica S. Nomura & N. Zinbo, 1940: synonym of Guraleus deshayesii (R.W. Dunker, 1860)
- Mangelia rossmaesleri H.E. Anton, 1838: synonym of Mangelia vauquelini (B.C.M. Payraudeau, 1826)
- Mangelia rubella Kurtz & Stimpson, 1851: synonym of Rubellatoma rubella (Kurtz & Stimpson, 1851)
- Mangelia rufanensis W.H. Turton, 1932: synonym of Mangelia eucosmia P. Bartsch, 1915
- Mangelia rugirima W.H. Dall, 1889: synonym of Glyphoturris rugirima (W.H. Dall, 1889)
- Mangelia rugulosa (Philippi, 1844): synonym of Mangelia unifasciata (Deshayes, 1835)
- Mangelia sanctigallae J.E. Tenison-Woods, 1877: synonym of Guraleus incrusta (J.E. Tenison-Woods, 1877)
- Mangelia sandrii Š. Brusina, 1865: synonym of Mangelia paciniana (Calcara, 1839)
- Mangelia scipio (Dall, 1889): synonym of Famelica scipio (Dall, 1889)
- Mangelia secalina (Philippi, 1844): synonym of Haedropleura secalina (Philippi, 1844)
- Mangelia serga (Dall, 1881): synonym of Kurtziella serga (Dall, 1881)
- Mangelia serga elongata É.A.A. Locard, 1897: synonym of Kurtziella serga (Dall, 1881)
- Mangelia sericifila (W.H. Dall, 1927): synonym of Pleurotomella bureaui (Dautzenberg & H. Fischer, 1897)
- Mangelia severa Thiele, 1925: synonym of Pseudorhaphitoma severa (Thiele, 1925)
- Mangelia signum J.C. Melvill & R. Standen, 1896: synonym of Eucithara eumerista (J.C. Melvill & R. Standen, 1896)
- Mangelia simplex J.P.S. Grateloup, 1847: synonym of Mangelia subsida (W.H. Dall, 1881)
- Mangelia smithii (Forbes, 1840): synonym of Mangelia costulata Risso, 1826
- Mangelia solida Reeve, 1846: synonym of Eucithara solida (Reeve, 1846)
- Mangelia souverbiei Tryon, 1884: synonym of Eucithara souverbiei (G.W. Tryon, 1884)
- † Mangelia sparsa (Boettger, 1901): synonym of † Raphitoma sparsa O. Boettger, 1902
- Mangelia spica (Hedley, 1907): synonym of Exomilopsis spica (Hedley, 1907)
- Mangelia splendida A. Adams, 1867: synonym of Horaiclavus splendidus (A. Adams, 1867)
- Mangelia stellata Stearns, 1872: synonym of Stellatoma stellata (Stearns, 1872)
- Mangelia stossiciana Brusina, 1869: synonym of Mangelia stosiciana Brusina, 1869
- Mangelia stromboides Reeve, 1846: synonym of Eucithara stromboides (Reeve, 1846)
- Mangelia strongyla Dall, 1927: synonym of Teretia strongyla (Dall, 1927)
- Mangelia subcancellata W. H. Turton, 1932: synonym of Clathurella grayi (Reeve, 1845)
- Mangelia subdiaphana Carpenter, 1864: synonym of Pyrgocythara subdiaphana (Carpenter, 1864)
- Mangelia subecaudata And. Bivona-Bernardi, 1838: synonym of Mangelia multilineolata (Deshayes, 1835)
- Mangelia tabulata Carpenter, 1864: synonym of Oenopota tabulata (Carpenter, 1864)
- Mangelia taeniata Reeve, 1846: synonym of Mangelia taeniata (Deshayes, 1835)
- Mangelia tenebrosa Reeve, 1846: synonym of Eucithara tenebrosa (Reeve, 1846)
- Mangelia tenuilirata Hedley, 1903: synonym of Guraleus tenuiliratus (Angas, 1871)
- Mangelia teres (Reeve, 1844): synonym of Teretia teres (Reeve, 1844)
- Mangelia tetragona Gould, 1861: synonym of Pseudorhaphitoma tetragona (Gould, 1861)
- Mangelia thalycra Melvill & Standen, 1896: synonym of Iredalea thalycra (Melvill, J.C. & R. Standen, 1897, "1896");
- Mangelia thecla Thiele, 1925: synonym of Paraclathurella thecla (Thiele, 1925)
- Mangelia theskela J.C. Melvill & R. Standen, 1895: synonym of Macteola theskela (J.C. Melvill & R. Standen, 1895)
- Mangelia toreumata (Dall, 1889): synonym of Crockerella toreumata (Dall, 1889)
- Mangelia trachys Tenison-Woods, 1878: synonym of Paramontana rufozonata (Angas, 1877)
- Mangelia trivittata Adams & Reeve, 1850: synonym of Eucithara trivittata (Adams & Reeve, 1850)
- Mangelia trizonata E.A. Smith, 1882: synonym of Neoguraleus trizonata (E. A. Smith, 1882)
- Mangelia tropica Thiele, 1925: synonym of Pseudorhaphitoma tropica (Thiele, 1925)
- Mangelia turricula Reeve, 1846: synonym of Eucithara turricula (Reeve, 1846)
- Mangelia turricula (Montagu, 1803): synonym of Propebela turricula (Montagu, 1803)
- Mangelia umbrosa Melvill, 1923: synonym of Pilsbryspira umbrosa (Melvill, 1923)
- Mangelia undaticosta Brazier, 1876: synonym of Anacithara undaticosta (Reeve, 1845)
- Mangelia undulata Risso, 1826: synonym of Mangelia unifasciata (Deshayes, 1835) (treated by Spada et al. 2023 as nomen oblitum)
- Mangelia unifasciata O.G. Costa, 1844: synonym of Mangelia vauquelini (B.C.M. Payraudeau, 1826)
- Mangelia vanaartseni Öztürk, 2021: synonym of Mangelia callosa (F. Nordsieck, 1977)
- Mangelia variegata Carpenter, 1864: synonym of Clathromangelia variegata (Carpenter, 1864)
- Mangelia vatovai F. Nordsieck, 1971: synonym of Kurtziella serga (W.H. Dall, 1881)
- Mangelia vauquelini É.A.A. Locard & E. Caziot, 1900: synonym of Mangelia vauquelini (B.C.M. Payraudeau, 1826)
- Mangelia vauquelini T.A. de M. Monterosato, 1878: synonym of Mangelia vauquelini (B.C.M. Payraudeau, 1826)
- Mangelia vauquelini M.E.J. Bucquoy, P. Dautzenberg & G.F. Dollfus, 1883: synonym of Mangelia vauquelini (B.C.M. Payraudeau, 1826)
- Mangelia vauquelini E. Réquien, 1848: synonym of Mangelia vauquelini (B.C.M. Payraudeau, 1826)
- Mangelia vexillum Reeve, 1846: synonym of Eucithara vexillum (Reeve, 1846)
- Mangelia villiersii A. Michaud, 1826: synonym of Mangelia attenuata (Montagu, G., 1803)
- Mangelia vincentina Angas, 1865: synonym of Guraleus pictus vincentinus (Crosse & Fischer, 1865)
- †Mangelia virginiana Conrad, 1862: synonym of †Bellaspira virginiana (Conrad, 1862)
- Mangelia vitrea Risso, 1826: synonym of Mitrella minor (Scacchi, 1836)
- Mangelia vitrea Bozzetti, 2009: synonym of Mangelia androyensis Bozzetti, 2009
- Mangelia vittata Hinds, 1843: synonym of Eucithara vittata (Hinds, 1843)
- Mangelia wareni Piani, 1980: synonym of Bela costulata (Risso, 1826): synonym of Mangelia costulata Risso, 1826
- Mangelia weinkauffi J.V. Carus, 1893: synonym of Mangelia unifasciata (G.P. Deshayes, 1835)
- Mangelia yuraensis Nomura & Zinbo, 1940: synonym of Zafra mitriformis A. Adams, 1860
- Mangelia zebuensis Reeve, 1846: synonym of Heterocithara zebuensis (Reeve, 1846)
- Mangelia zonata Reeve, 1846: synonym of Eucithara coronata (Hinds, 1843)
- Mangelia farina (Nordsieck, 1977): (nomen dubium)
- Mangelia grisea (Nordsieck, 1977): (nomen dubium)
- †Mangelia menardiana Risso, 1826 (Species inquirenda)
