= Mangelia edentula =

Scientific classification
- Kingdom: Animalia
- Phylum: Mollusca
- Class: Gastropoda
- Subclass: Caenogastropoda
- Order: Neogastropoda
- Superfamily: Conoidea
- Family: Mangeliidae
- Genus: Mangelia
- Species: M. edentula

Binomial name
- Mangelia edentula O. Böttger, 1895

Synonyms
- Guraleus edentula (Boettger, 1895); Mangilia edentula O. Böttger, 1895 (original description)

Species of gastropod

Mangelia edentula is a species of sea snail, a marine gastropod mollusk in the family Mangeliidae.

== Description ==
The length of the shell attains 6 mm, its diameter 2 mm.

== Distribution ==
This marine species occurs off the Philippines.
