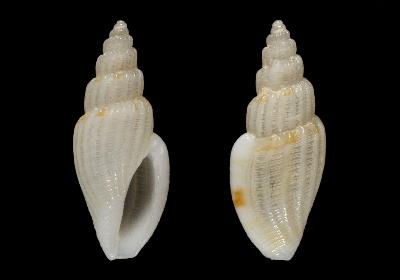
- Shell of Mangelia androyensis (holotype in the MNHN, Paris)

Scientific classification
- Kingdom: Animalia
- Phylum: Mollusca
- Class: Gastropoda
- Subclass: Caenogastropoda
- Order: Neogastropoda
- Superfamily: Conoidea
- Family: Mangeliidae
- Genus: Mangelia
- Species: M. androyensis

Binomial name
- Mangelia androyensis L. Bozzetti, 2009

Synonyms
- Mangelia vitrea Bozzetti, L., 2009 (Invalid: primary homonym of Mangelia vitrea Risso, 1826)

= Mangelia androyensis =

Species of gastropod

Mangelia androyensis is a species of sea snail, a marine gastropod mollusk in the family Mangeliidae.

== Description ==
The length of the shell attains 7.5 mm, its shape holding a spiral cone tip and a hollow bottom. It has subtle spiral threads and varices giving it a sort of 'grid' or 'threaded' pattern. It has an aperture and a thick outer lip.

== Distribution ==
This species occurs in the Indian Ocean off Madagascar.
