= Mangelia limata =

Scientific classification
- Kingdom: Animalia
- Phylum: Mollusca
- Class: Gastropoda
- Subclass: Caenogastropoda
- Order: Neogastropoda
- Superfamily: Conoidea
- Family: Mangeliidae
- Genus: Mangelia
- Species: M. limata

Binomial name
- Mangelia limata (A.A. Olsson, 1922)

Synonyms
- † Cytharella limata A.A. Olsson, 1922

Extinct species of sea snail

Mangelia limata is an extinct species of sea snail, a marine gastropod mollusk in the family Mangeliidae, known from one fossil.

== Description ==
The shell is 9 mm long and 3.5 mm in diameter. It is nearly smooth and porcellaneous. The spire is slightly shorter than the narrow aperture. The protoconch consists of three smooth convex whorls, then a half whorl finely and closely ribbed. Three and a half subsequent whorls consist in sculpture of narrow, slightly oblique ribs which pass across the spire-whorls between sutures. On the body whorl, eight follow down the anterior canal to its tip. The spaces between the ribs are wide, flat and smooth. The tops and sides of the ribs are etched with fine subobsolete spiral lines. The aperture is linear-elliptical. The outer lip is somewhat thickened by the last rib, and smooth within. The anterior canal is long and straight.

== Distribution ==
This fossil was found in the Gatun Stage of Pliocene strata in Costa Rica.
