= Mangelia ecuadoriana =

Scientific classification
- Kingdom: Animalia
- Phylum: Mollusca
- Class: Gastropoda
- Subclass: Caenogastropoda
- Order: Neogastropoda
- Superfamily: Conoidea
- Family: Mangeliidae
- Genus: Mangelia
- Species: M. ecuadoriana

Binomial name
- Mangelia ecuadoriana H.A. Pilsbry & A.A. Olsson, 1941

Extinct species of gastropod

Mangelia ecuadoriana is an extinct species of sea snail, a marine gastropod mollusk in the family Mangeliidae.

== Description ==
The length of the shell attains 3 mm, its diameter 1.8 mm.

== Distribution ==
This extinct marine species was found in Pliocene-Pleistocene strata of Ecuador; age range: 5.332 to 2.588 Ma.
