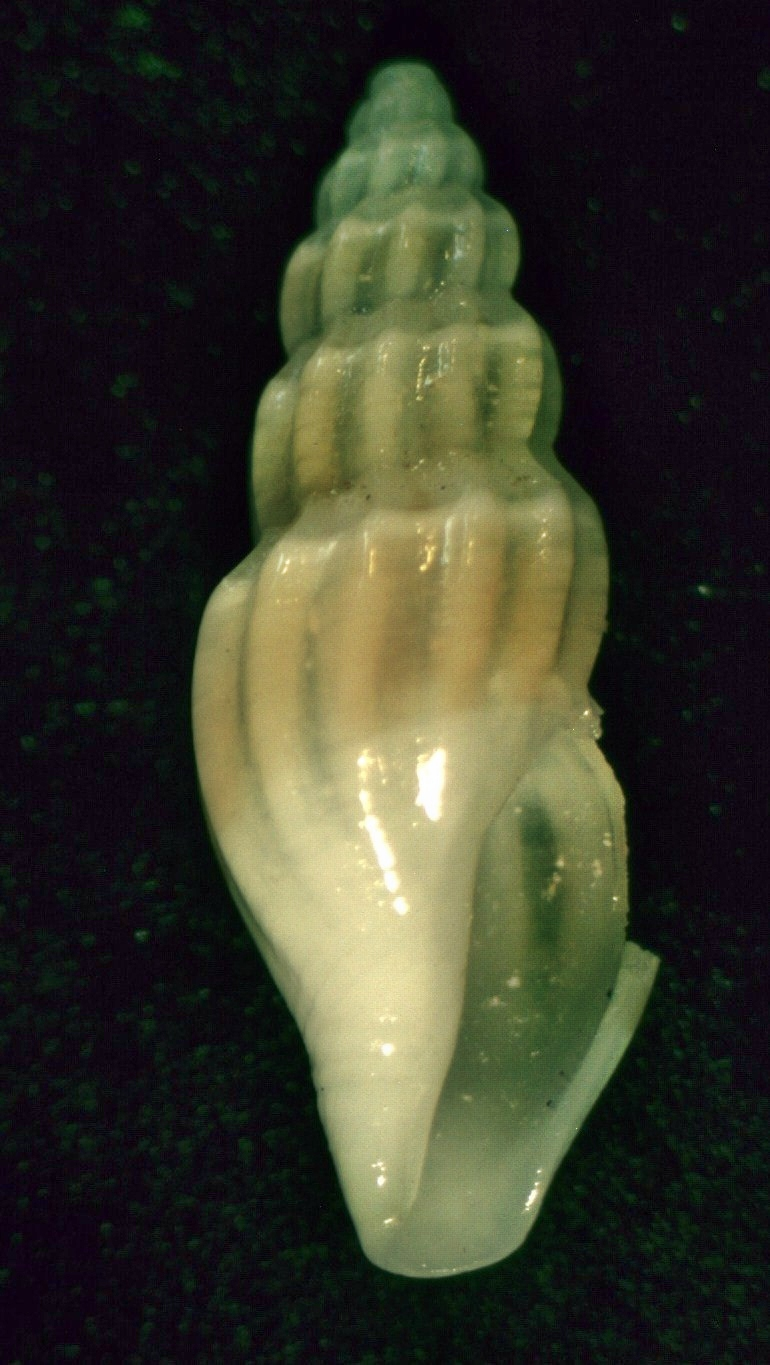
- Guraleus pictus

Scientific classification
- Kingdom: Animalia
- Phylum: Mollusca
- Class: Gastropoda
- Subclass: Caenogastropoda
- Order: Neogastropoda
- Superfamily: Conoidea
- Family: Mangeliidae
- Genus: Guraleus; Hedley, 1918

Type species
- Mangelia picta Adams & Angas, 1864

Species
- See text

Synonyms
- Euguraleus Cotton, 1947; Guraleus (Euguraleus) Cotton, 1947 ·

= Guraleus =

Genus of molluscs

Guraleus is a genus of sea snails, marine gastropod mollusks in the family Mangeliidae.

== Description ==
The thin shell is fusiform or subcylindrical. The colour ranges from uniform buff, with or without chocolate spiral lines or bands, to entire chocolate. The protoconch consists of two or three smooth helicoid whorls. Fasciole don't interrupt the sculpture, and are scarcely indicated by the curvature of growth lines.

Sculpture :—The radials vary from bold spaced ribs projecting at the shoulder to fine close riblets. The entire shell, except the protoconch, is overrun with fine, close, beaded or unbeaded threads. The aperture measures about half the length of the shell, with or without armature. The outer lip is slightly inflected. The sinus is subsutural, deeply rounded. The siphonal canal is short and open.

== Distribution ==
This genus of marine species occurs off Sumatra (Indonesia) and Australia (New South Wales, Queensland, South Australia, Tasmania, Victoria, Western Australia). One species, Guraleus amplexus, occurs off South Africa, another, Guraleus kamakuranus off Japan and Korea.

== Species ==
According to the World Register of Marine Species (WoRMS) the following species with valid names are included within the genus Guraleus:

- † Guraleus adelaidensis A. W. B. Powell, 1944
- Guraleus alucinans (Sowerby III, 1896)
- Guraleus amplexus (Gould, 1860)
- Guraleus anisus (Cotton, 1947)
- Guraleus asper Laseron, 1954
- Guraleus bordaensis Cotton, 1947
- Guraleus brazieri (Angas, 1871)
- † Guraleus chapplei A. W. B. Powell, 1944
- Guraleus colmani Shuto, 1983
- Guraleus cuspis (Sowerby III, 1896)
- Guraleus delicatulus (Tenison-Woods, 1879)
- Guraleus deshayesii (Dunker, 1860)
- Guraleus diacritus Cotton, 1947
- † Guraleus dubius Maxwell, 1992
- † Guraleus eocenicus D. C. Long, 1981
- Guraleus fallaciosus (Sowerby III, 1896)
- Guraleus fascinus Hedley, 1922
- Guraleus fijiensis Ladd, 1982
- Guraleus flaccidus (Pritchard & Gatliff, 1899):
- Guraleus flavescens (Angas, 1877)
- Guraleus florus Cotton, 1947
- † Guraleus formosus Ladd, 1982
- Guraleus fossa Laseron, 1954
- Guraleus halmahericus (Schepman, 1913)
- † Guraleus harrisi A. W. B. Powell, 1944
- Guraleus himerodes (Melvill & Standen, 1896)
- Guraleus incrustus (Tenison Woods, 1877)
- † Guraleus janjukiensis A. W. B. Powell, 1944
- Guraleus kamakuranus (Pilsbry, 1904)
- Guraleus lallemantianus (Crosse & Fischer, 1865)
- † Guraleus ludbrookae A. W. B. Powell, 1944
- Guraleus nanus Laseron, 1954
- Guraleus ornatus (Sowerby III, 1896)
- Guraleus pictus (Adams & Angas, 1864)
- † Guraleus powelli (Ludbrook, 1958)
- Guraleus savuensis (Schepman, 1913)
- † Guraleus singletoni A. W. B. Powell, 1944
- † Guraleus subnitidus Ludbrook, 1941
- Guraleus tabatensis (Tokunaga, 1906)
- Guraleus tasmanicus (Tenison-Woods, 1876)
- Guraleus tasmantis Laseron, 1954
- Guraleus thornleyanus (Laseron, 1954)
- Guraleus tokunagae (Finlay, 1926)
- Guraleus verhoeffeni (Martens, 1904)
- † Guraleus vitilevensis Ladd, 1982
- † Guraleus volutiformis Chapman & Crespin, 1928
- Guraleus wilesianus Hedley, 1922
- Guraleus yangzhiganlu L.-W. Lin, J.-L. Jiang & Y. Shao, 2025

Species brought into synonymy

- Guraleus australis (Adams & Angas, 1864): synonym of Mitraguraleus mitralis (Adams & Angas, 1864)
- Guraleus bellus (Adams, A. & G.F. Angas, 1864): synonym of Antiguraleus adcocki (G. B. Sowerby III, 1896)
- Guraleus comptus (Adams & Angas, 1864): synonym of Marita compta (A. Adams & Angas, 1864)
- Guraleus costatus Hedley, 1922: synonym of Antiguraleus costatus (Hedley, 1922)
- † Guraleus cuspidatus Chapple, 1934: synonym of † Pleurotomella cuspidata (Chapple, 1934)
- Guraleus fallaciosa (Sowerby III, 1896): synonym of * Guraleus fallaciosus (Sowerby III, 1896)
- Guraleus incrusta (Tenison-Woods, 1877): synonym of Guraleus incrustus (Tenison-Woods, 1877)
- Guraleus inornatus (Sowerby, 1897): synonym of Marita inornata (Sowerby III, 1896)
- Guraleus insculptus (Adams & Angas, 1864): synonym of Marita insculpta (Adams & Angas, 1864)
- Guraleus jacksonensis (Angas, 1877): synonym of Guraleus tasmanicus (Tenison Woods, 1876) (unaccepted > junior subjective synonym)
- Guraleus letouneuxianus Crosse and Fischer, 1865: synonym of Turrella letourneuxiana (Crosse and Fischer, 1865)
- Guraleus morologus Hedley, 1922: synonym of Turrella morologus (Hedley, 1922)
- Guraleus nitidus Hedley, 1922 : synonym of Marita nitidus (Hedley, 1922)
- Guraleus permutatus Hedley, 1922 : synonym of Antiguraleus permutatus (Hedley, 1922)
- Guraleus pulchripicta (Melvill & Standen, 1901): synonym of Lienardia pulchripictus (Melvill & Standen, 1901)
- Guraleus schoutenensis May, 1901: synonym of Marita schoutenensis (May, 1911)
- Guraleus semicarinatus (H.A. Pilsbry, 1904): synonym of Heterocithara semicarinatus (H.A. Pilsbry, 1904)
- Guraleus vulgata (J.Thiele, 1925);: synonym of Mangelia vulgata J. Thiele, 1925 (taxon inquirendum)
