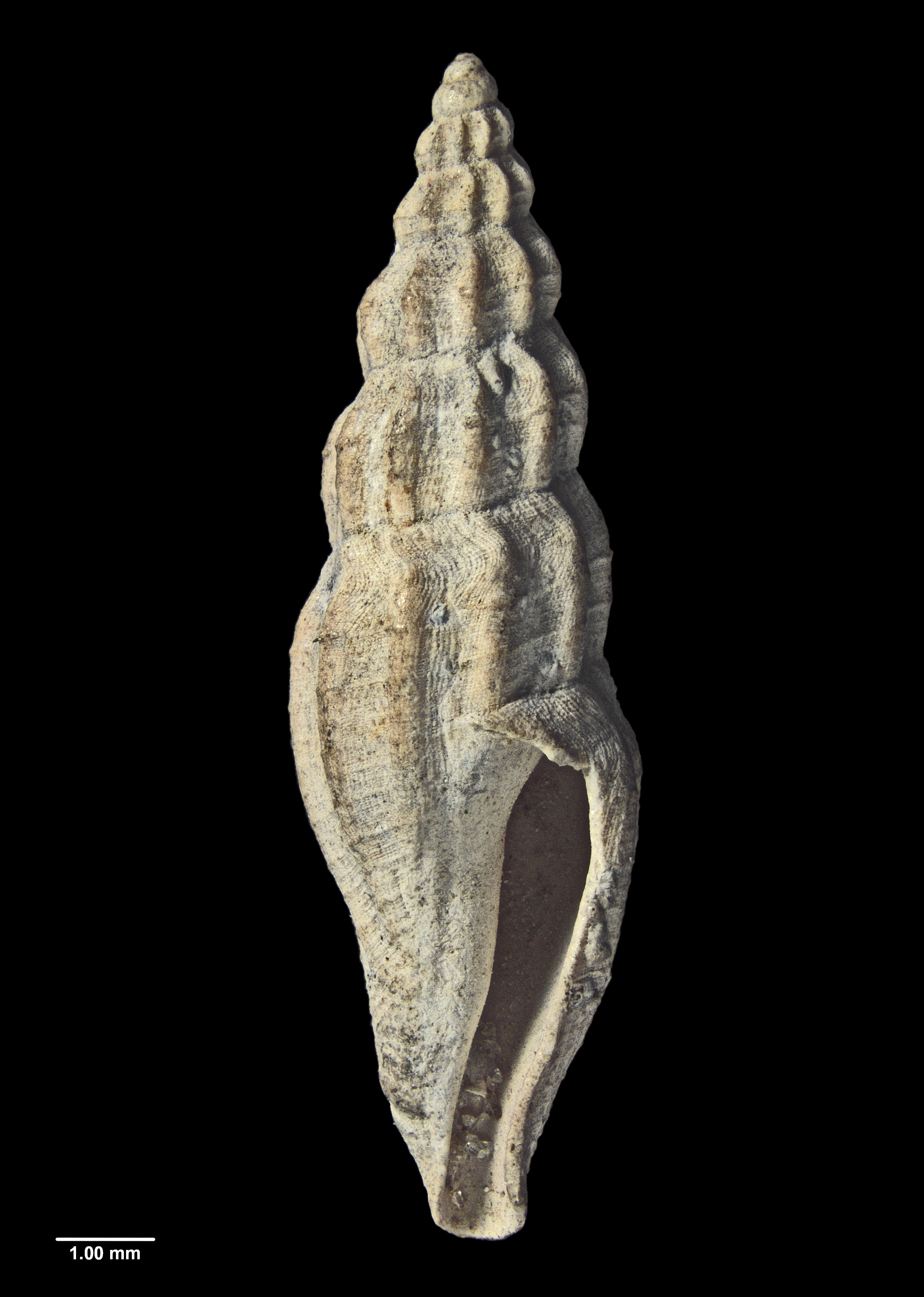
- Holotype from Auckland War Memorial Museum

Scientific classification
- Kingdom: Animalia
- Phylum: Mollusca
- Class: Gastropoda
- Subclass: Caenogastropoda
- Order: Neogastropoda
- Family: Mangeliidae
- Genus: Guraleus
- Species: †G. chapplei

Binomial name
- †Guraleus chapplei A. W. B. Powell, 1944

Synonyms
- Guraleus (Guraleus) chapplei A. W. B. Powell, 1944

= Guraleus chapplei =

Guraleus chapplei Temporal range: middle Miocene

Extinct species of gastropod

Guraleus chapplei is an extinct species of sea snail, a marine gastropod mollusc, in the family Mangeliidae. Fossils of the species date to middle Miocene strata of the St Vincent Basin of South Australia.

== Description ==
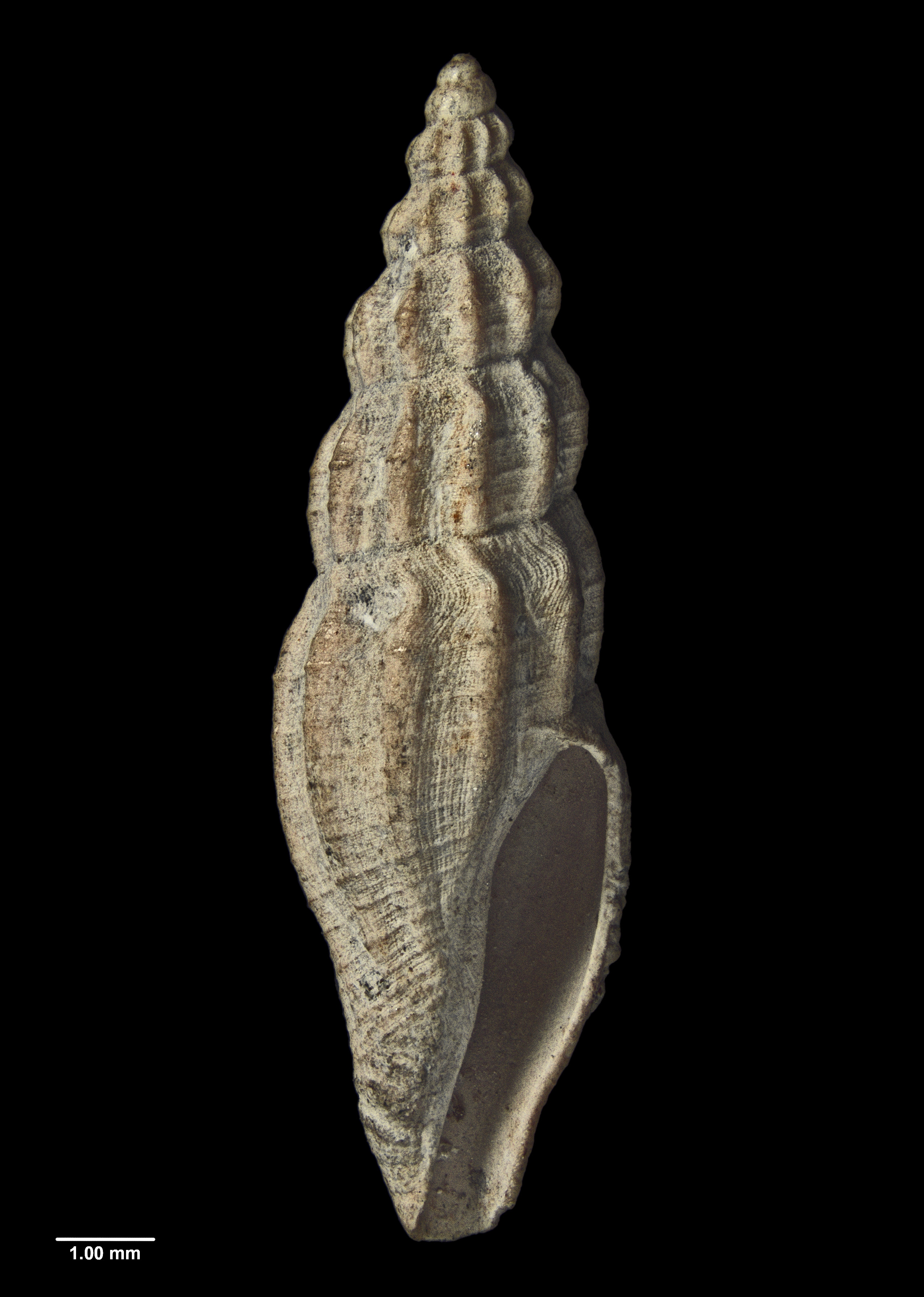
Reverse view of holotype

In the original description, Powell described the species as follows:

Elongate-fusiform, like the Recent tasmanicus (T.-Woods), but narrower. Whorls bluntly angled just above the middle, sculptured with strong rounded axials, 10 per whorl, extending from upper suture completely over base, crossed by distant narrow primary cords and fine interstitial lirations. Spire-whorls with exceedingly fine and numerous lirae on the shoulder, three primary cords from angle to lower suture, and about ten primaries on the body-whorl, six of them distantly spaced, remainder bunched at the neck. The interspaces each have three secondary lirations crossed by much finer dense axial threads. The anterior end is finely lirate. Sinus, aperture and protoconch all typical of the genus.

The holotype of the species measures 12.5 mm (0.49 in) in length and has a diameter of 3.9 mm (0.15 in). It differs from G. ludbrookae due to having different numbers of ribs per whorl, by being more elongated, and the greater validity of spirals.

== Taxonomy ==
The species was first described by A. W. B. Powell in 1944. The holotype was collected by W. Howchin and J.C. Verco in 1919 from the Metropolitan Abattoirs Bore in Adelaide, South Australia, at a depth of between 122–152 m (400–499 ft). It is held in the collections of Auckland War Memorial Museum.

== Distribution ==
This extinct marine species occurs in middle Miocene strata of the St Vincent Basin of South Australia, including the Dry Creek Sands.
