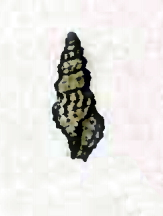
- Drawing of a shell of Guraleus incrustus

Scientific classification
- Kingdom: Animalia
- Phylum: Mollusca
- Class: Gastropoda
- Subclass: Caenogastropoda
- Order: Neogastropoda
- Superfamily: Conoidea
- Family: Mangeliidae
- Genus: Guraleus
- Species: G. incrustus

Binomial name
- Guraleus incrustus (Tenison-Woods, 1877)

Synonyms
- Clathurella st. Gallae (sic.) Verco, J.C. 1909; Clathurella incrusta Tryon, 1884; Drillia incrusta Tenison-Woods, 1877; Guraleus (Guraleus) incrusta (Tenison-Woods, 1877); Guraleus incrustus (Tenison-Woods, 1877); Mangelia st-gallae Tenison-Woods, 1877; Pleurotoma (Drilla ?) incrusta Tenison-Woods, 1877 (original combination)

= Guraleus incrustus =

Species of gastropod

Guraleus incrustus is a species of sea snail, a marine gastropod mollusk in the family Mangeliidae.

== Description ==
The length of the shell attains 7 mm. It is a smaller shell than Guraleus lallemantianus (Crosse & Fischer, 1865), with two of the revolving striae more prominent (on the body whorl 8–9), slightly keel-like.

== Distribution ==
This marine species is endemic to Australia and can be found off Western Australia, South Australia, Tasmania and Victoria.
