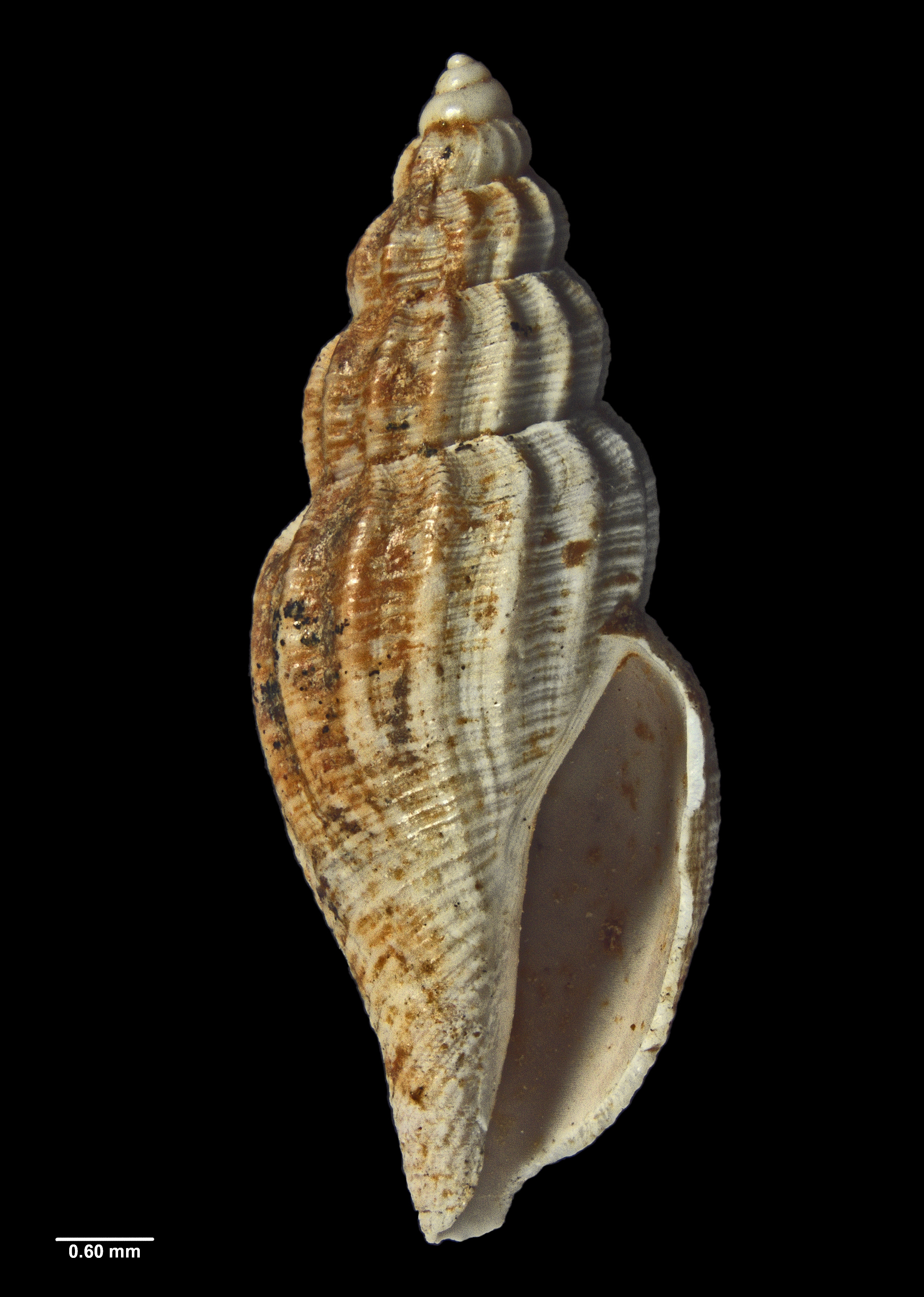
- Holotype from Auckland War Memorial Museum

Scientific classification
- Kingdom: Animalia
- Phylum: Mollusca
- Class: Gastropoda
- Subclass: Caenogastropoda
- Order: Neogastropoda
- Family: Mangeliidae
- Genus: Guraleus
- Species: †G. harrisi

Binomial name
- †Guraleus harrisi A. W. B. Powell, 1944

= Guraleus harrisi =

Guraleus harrisi Temporal range: middle Miocene

Extinct species of gastropod

Guraleus harrisi is an extinct species of sea snail, a marine gastropod mollusc, in the family Mangeliidae. Fossils of the species date to middle Miocene strata of the Otway Basin of South Australia and Victoria.

== Description ==
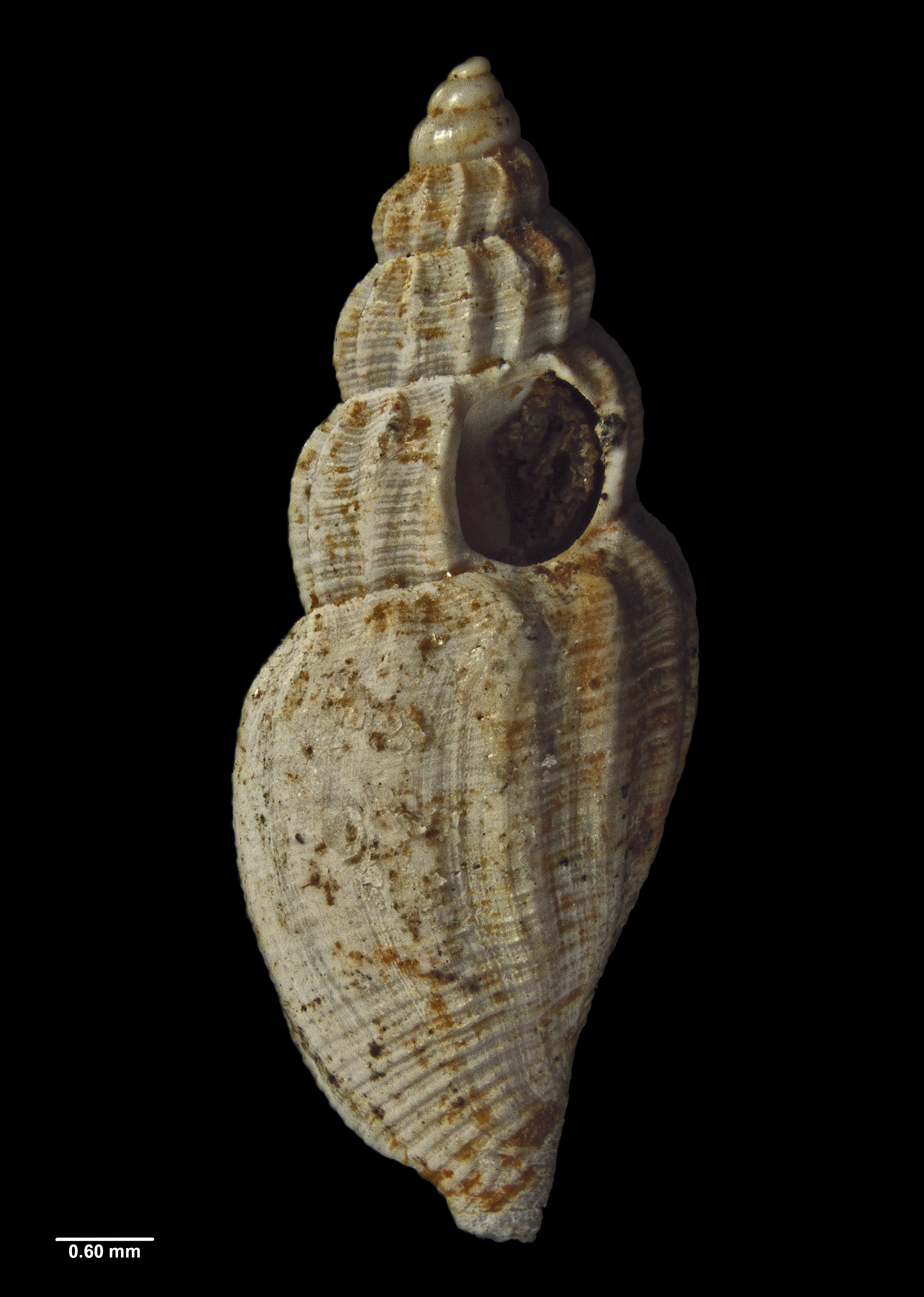
Reverse view of holotype

In the original description, Powell described the species as follows:

Similar to janjukiensis, but whorls not so strongly convex, weakly angled above middle and with stronger sculpture, consisting of primary and secondary spirals. Axials strong, rounded, 14 per whorl, extending from upper suture completely over base. Spiral sculpture consisting of 8 fine lirations on the shoulder or sinus area, 5 primary spirals with a thread in each interspace from shoulder angle to lower suture, and about 26 primary spirals on body-whorl, the interstitial threads not continuing below the upper third of the base. Protoconch polygyrate, conic, of 3 smooth whorls, with minute exserted tip, followed by a half whorl of straight vertical brephic axial threads.

The holotype of the species measures 7.75 mm (0.305 in) in length and has a diameter of 3 mm (0.12 in).

== Taxonomy ==
The species was first described by A. W. B. Powell in 1944. The holotype was collected at an unknown date prior to 1945 from Clifton Bank, Hamilton, Victoria, and is held in the collections of Auckland War Memorial Museum.

== Distribution ==
This extinct marine species occurs in middle Miocene strata of the Otway Basin of South Australia and Victoria, including the Muddy Creek Formation.
