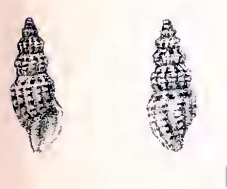
- Original image of a shell of Guraleus ornatus

Scientific classification
- Kingdom: Animalia
- Phylum: Mollusca
- Class: Gastropoda
- Subclass: Caenogastropoda
- Order: Neogastropoda
- Superfamily: Conoidea
- Family: Mangeliidae
- Genus: Guraleus
- Species: G. ornatus

Binomial name
- Guraleus ornatus (G. B. Sowerby III, 1896)

Synonyms
- Mangilia alucinans var. ornata G. B. Sowerby III, 1896 (basionym)

= Guraleus ornatus =

Species of gastropod

Guraleus ornatus is a species of sea snail, a marine gastropod mollusk in the family Mangeliidae.

== Description ==
The length of the shell attains 8.5 mm, its diameter 3 mm.

Originally described by Sowerby III as a variety of Mangilia alucinans (synonym of Guraleus alucinans), but with a longer spire and with red spots on the ribs. .

== Distribution ==
This marine species is endemic to Australia and can be found off South Australia.
