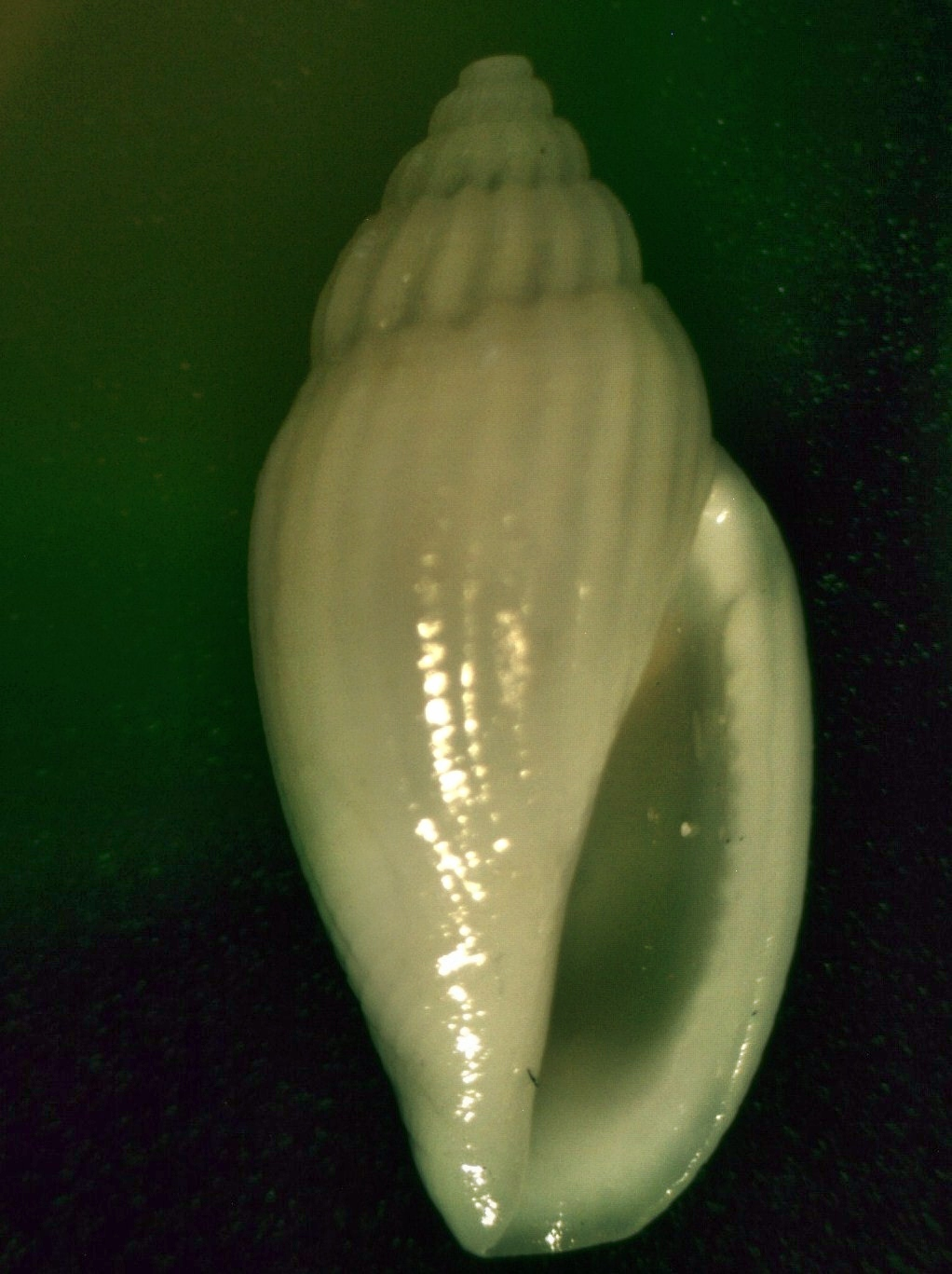
- Shell of Marita compta

Scientific classification
- Kingdom: Animalia
- Phylum: Mollusca
- Class: Gastropoda
- Subclass: Caenogastropoda
- Order: Neogastropoda
- Superfamily: Conoidea
- Family: Mangeliidae
- Genus: Marita; Hedley, 1922

Type species
- Cithara compta Adams & Angas, 1864

Synonyms
- Guraleus (Marita) Hedley, 1922

= Marita (gastropod) =

Genus of gastropods

Marita is a genus of sea snails, marine gastropod mollusks in the family Mangeliidae.

== Description ==
Originally considered a subgenus of Guraleus, it was separated by Charles Henley in 1922 because of these special characteristics: rounded shoulder, ovate contour, shorter spire, and a smoother sculpture.

== Distribution ==
This marine genus is endemic to Australia and occurs off New South Wales, South Australia, Tasmania, Victoria and Western Australia

== Species ==
Species within the genus Marita include according to the World Register of Marine Species (WoRMS)

- Marita compta (Adams & Angas, 1864)
- Marita elongata Laseron, 1954
- Marita inornata (Sowerby III, 1896)
- Marita insculpta (Adams & Angas, 1864)
- Marita nitida (Hedley, 1922)
- Marita schoutenensis (May, 1901)
- Marita tumida Laseron, 1954

Species brought into synonymy

- Marita bella (Adams & Angas, 1864): synonym of Antiguraleus adcocki (G. B. Sowerby III, 1896)
- Marita peregrina A.A. Gould, 1860: synonym of Marita compta (Adams & Angas, 1864)
- Marita varix J.E. Tenison-Woods, 1877: synonym of Marita compta (Adams & Angas, 1864)
