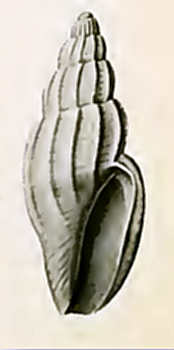
- Original image of a shell of Marita nitida

Scientific classification
- Kingdom: Animalia
- Phylum: Mollusca
- Class: Gastropoda
- Subclass: Caenogastropoda
- Order: Neogastropoda
- Superfamily: Conoidea
- Family: Mangeliidae
- Genus: Marita
- Species: M. nitida

Binomial name
- Marita nitida (Hedley, 1922)

Synonyms
- Guraleus nitidus Hedley, 1922 (original combination); Guraleus (Guraleus) nitidus Hedley, 1922

= Marita nitida =

Species of gastropod

Marita nitida is a species of sea snail, a marine gastropod mollusk in the family Mangeliidae.

== Description ==
The length of the shell attains 7.5 mm, its diameter 3 mm.

The small, thin shell is translucent, glossy and narrow-ovate. Its colour is white, with a few faint rusty spots. It contains 5½ whorls, two of which compose the protoconch.

Sculpture The radials are elevate narrow spaced ribs—on the first adult whorl eleven, on the body whorl eight. Between these ribs are incised spiral lines, increasing from six on the first adult whorl to about twenty-four on the last.

Aperture :—The aperture is narrow. The varix is slight. The sinus is indefinite.

== Distribution ==
This marine species is endemic to Australia and occurs off South Australia.
