= Guraleus bordaensis =

Scientific classification
- Kingdom: Animalia
- Phylum: Mollusca
- Class: Gastropoda
- Subclass: Caenogastropoda
- Order: Neogastropoda
- Superfamily: Conoidea
- Family: Mangeliidae
- Genus: Guraleus
- Species: G. bordaensis

Binomial name
- Guraleus bordaensis B.C. Cotton, 1947

Synonyms
- Guraleus (Guraleus) bordaensis (Cotton, 1947)

Species of gastropod

Guraleus bordaensis is a species of sea snail, a marine gastropod mollusk in the family Mangeliidae.

== Distribution ==
This marine species is endemic to Australia and can be found off Western Australia, South Australia and Tasmania.
