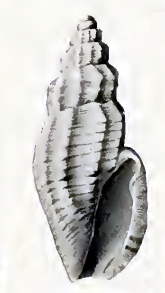
- Shell of Guraleus flaccidus

Scientific classification
- Kingdom: Animalia
- Phylum: Mollusca
- Class: Gastropoda
- Subclass: Caenogastropoda
- Order: Neogastropoda
- Superfamily: Conoidea
- Family: Mangeliidae
- Genus: Guraleus
- Species: G. flaccidus

Binomial name
- Guraleus flaccidus (Pritchard & Gatliff, 1899)

Synonyms
- Guraleus (Guraleus) flaccidus Laseron, 1954; Mangilia flaccida Pritchard & Gatliff, 1899 (original combination)

= Guraleus flaccidus =

Species of gastropod

Guraleus flaccidus is a species of sea snail, a marine gastropod mollusk in the family Mangeliidae.

== Description ==
The length of the shell varies between 9 mm and 15 mm.

(Original description) The shell is narrowly elongate, with a rather acute apex in unworn specimens, but most of the adult specimens hitherto examined appear blunt and obtuse on account of apical erosion. The about two embryonic whorls are smooth and shining, and slightly convex. The succeeding whorls number about four or five, and are strongly costate. The spire whorls are subangulate a little below the suture, giving t he latter the appearance of being somewhat impressed. Each whorl bears from ten to twelve strong costae, usually the former number. The costae are slightly oblique, are usually narrower than the interspaces between them and extend of a uniform breadth from the anterior suture to the posterior angulation, thence to the posterior suture tapering slightly, and forwardly directed to a slight extent. On the anterior lower half of the body whorl the costae are backwardly arched, and thin out towards the columella. The costae and interspaces are both crossed transversely by fairly strong and intermediate fine series of spiral threads, the strong and prominent threads numbering from three to six to a whorl, with several tine threadlets between them. In young, and in well preserved adult shells, the coarser spiral threads where they cross the costae, cause the latter to have a regular beaded or granulated appearance, but in some adult specimens there appears to be a tendency for this type of ornament to become indistinct or obsolete towards the body whorl. Parallel to the costae fine strife-like lines of growth are discernible under a lens. The aperture is ovate, with a somewhat narrow but well defined sinus posteriorly just below the suture, and with a short broad and shallow anterior canal. The columella is smooth and slightly twisted. The outer lip in adult specimens has a thin edge from the sinus to the anterior lower margin of the siphonal canal, with a well-marked varicose thickening behind, extending from the anterior canal up to and then round the sinus to the suture, where it thins out in a pad-like form on the inner lip. The outer lip is somewhat effuse anteriorly. The colour of the shell is white to creamy, with a pale or faded violet-brown broad band on the anterior slope of the body whorl, and a faint narrow band near the suture, and usually just discernible above the anterior suture of the penultimate whorl. Occasionally darker spots of a brownish colour are to be seen on the costae of the body whorl at or a little below the centre of the whorl.

== Distribution ==
This marine species is endemic to Australia and can be found off South Australia, Tasmania, Victoria
