= Guraleus dubius =

Scientific classification
- Kingdom: Animalia
- Phylum: Mollusca
- Class: Gastropoda
- Subclass: Caenogastropoda
- Order: Neogastropoda
- Superfamily: Conoidea
- Family: Mangeliidae
- Genus: Guraleus
- Species: G. dubius

Binomial name
- Guraleus dubius Maxwell, 1992

Extinct species of gastropod

Guraleus dubius is an extinct species of sea snail, a marine gastropod mollusk in the family Mangeliidae.

== Distribution ==
This marine species occurs as a fossil in Middle to Late Eocene strata of New Zealand.
