= Guraleus colmani =

Scientific classification
- Kingdom: Animalia
- Phylum: Mollusca
- Class: Gastropoda
- Subclass: Caenogastropoda
- Order: Neogastropoda
- Superfamily: Conoidea
- Family: Mangeliidae
- Genus: Guraleus
- Species: G. colmani

Binomial name
- Guraleus colmani T. Shuto, 1983

Synonyms
- Guraleus (Euguraleus) colmani T. Shuto, 1983

Species of gastropod

Guraleus colmani is a species of sea snail, a marine gastropod mollusk in the family Mangeliidae.

== Distribution ==
This marine species is endemic to Australia and can be found off the Northern Territory.
