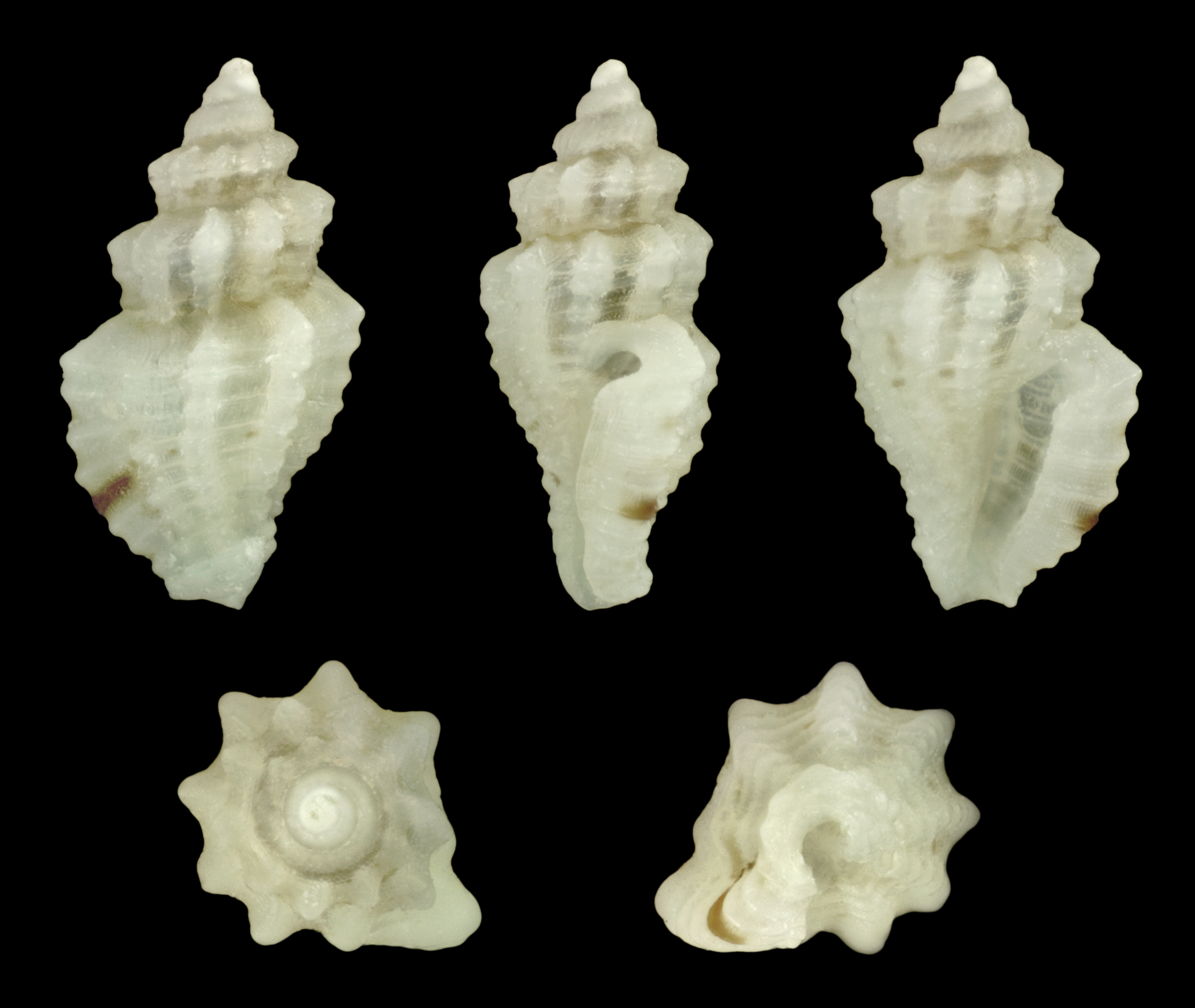
- Shell of Guraleus himerodes

Scientific classification
- Kingdom: Animalia
- Phylum: Mollusca
- Class: Gastropoda
- Subclass: Caenogastropoda
- Order: Neogastropoda
- Superfamily: Conoidea
- Family: Mangeliidae
- Genus: Guraleus
- Species: G. himerodes

Binomial name
- Guraleus himerodes (Melvill & Standen, 1896)

Synonyms
- Mangilia himerodes Melvill & Standen, 1896 (original combination)

= Guraleus himerodes =

Species of gastropod

Guraleus himerodes is a species of sea snail, a marine gastropod mollusk in the family Mangeliidae.

== Description ==
The length of the shell attains 6.5 mm, its diameter 2.5 mm.

(Original description) A pure white, extremely delicate little species, subvitreous, fusiform. It contains seven whorls, two of which are glassy and apical, the remainder being all very delicately ribbed, with spiral lirae, the interstices longitudinally striolate. At the sutures and the angle of the whorls there is a pale ochre band, again appearing, but almost obsoletely, in the middle of the body whorl. It is very conspicuous, however, just at the back of the outer lip. The aperture is narrow. The outer lip is thickened. The columella is simple.

== Distribution ==
This marine species occurs in the central Pacific Ocean. The original specimen was found off Lifou Island.
