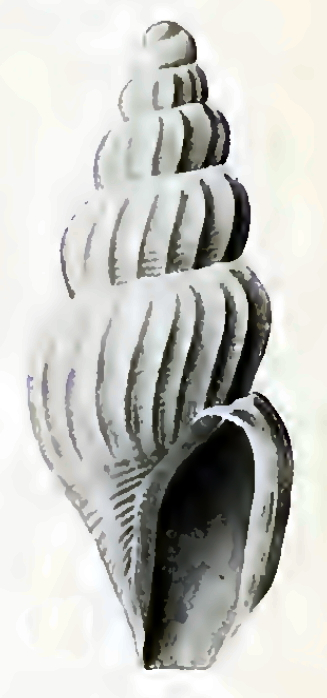
- Original image of a shell of Antiguraleus costatus

Scientific classification
- Kingdom: Animalia
- Phylum: Mollusca
- Class: Gastropoda
- Subclass: Caenogastropoda
- Order: Neogastropoda
- Superfamily: Conoidea
- Family: Mangeliidae
- Genus: Antiguraleus
- Species: A. costatus

Binomial name
- Antiguraleus costatus (Hedley, 1922)

Synonyms
- Antiguraleus costatus wilesianus (Hedley, 1922); Guraleus costatus Hedley, 1922 (original combination); Guraleus costatus wilesianus Hedley, 1922; Guraleus wilesianus Hedley, 1922; Paraguraleus costatus (Hedley, 1922)

= Antiguraleus costatus =

Species of gastropod

Antiguraleus costatus is a species of sea snail, a marine gastropod mollusk in the family Mangeliidae.

== Taxonomy ==
The World Register of Marine Species still accepts the name Guraleus wilesianus Hedley, 1922 as the accepted name, relying on the original description by Hedley as Guraleus costatus var. wilesianus Hedley, 1922 However, Sealifebase accepts the name Antiguraleus wilesianus (Hedley, 1922). To complicate the matter, the Australian Museum records this species as Antiguraleus costatus (Hedley, 1922) with the syntype Guraleus costatus wilesianus Hedley, 1922 and accepts it as Antiguraleus costatus wilesianus (Hedley, 1922) As of 2017 there has been no authoritative revision of this group.

== Description ==
The length of the shell attains 10 mm, its diameter 3 mm.

(Original description) The small, thin shell has an elongate-ovate shape. Its colour is pale cream, with one or two faint and narrow buff zones. Itcontains six whorls, of which two form the protoconch. The upper whorls are glossy. The sculpture shows narrow, sharp radials, elevated riblets, becoming closer and smaller as growth proceeds, and vanishing on the base. The first adult whorl has sixteen riblets, which increase to about twenty-seven on the body whorl. The base of the shell has about ten incised spiral lines. The aperture is wide. The outer lip is thin, not inflected, with a wide and shallow sinus.

== Distribution ==
This marine species is endemic to Australia and occurs off New South Wales.
