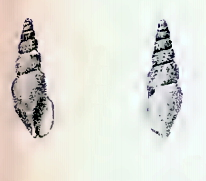
- Original drawing of a shell of Guraleus fallaciosus

Scientific classification
- Kingdom: Animalia
- Phylum: Mollusca
- Class: Gastropoda
- Subclass: Caenogastropoda
- Order: Neogastropoda
- Superfamily: Conoidea
- Family: Mangeliidae
- Genus: Guraleus
- Species: G. fallaciosus

Binomial name
- Guraleus fallaciosus (G. B. Sowerby III, 1896)

Synonyms
- Daphnella (?) fallaciosa G. B. Sowerby III, 1896 (original combination); Guraleus (Guraleus) fallaciosus (G.B. Sowerby III, 1897); Mangilia fallaciosa (G.B. Sowerby III, 1897)

= Guraleus fallaciosus =

Species of gastropod

Guraleus fallaciosus is a species of sea snail, a marine gastropod mollusk in the family Mangeliidae.

== Description ==
The length of the shell attains 10 mm, its diameter 3.25 mm.

(Original description) The dirty white, elongately turreted shell has an acuminate spire with a papillary apex . It contains 6½ convex whorls, barely angulate and densely spirally striated. The sutures are narrowly canaliculate. The aperture is fairly wide. The outer lip is thin and backwards slightly sinuate. The columella is rather straight. .It is a shell of simple character, with a rather long spire and short mouth. It is closely spirally striated, only the upper whorls showing ribs or plicae.

== Distribution ==
This marine species is endemic to Australia and can be found off South Australia, Tasmania, Victoria.
