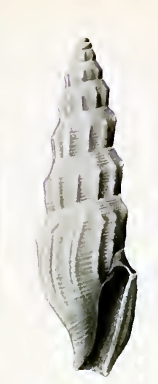
- Shell of Guraleus brazieri

Scientific classification
- Kingdom: Animalia
- Phylum: Mollusca
- Class: Gastropoda
- Subclass: Caenogastropoda
- Order: Neogastropoda
- Superfamily: Conoidea
- Family: Mangeliidae
- Genus: Guraleus
- Species: G. brazieri

Binomial name
- Guraleus brazieri (Angas, G.F., 1871)

Synonyms
- Clathurella brazieri Angas, 1871 (original combination); Daphnella brazieri Hedley, 1903; Guraleus (Guraleus) brazieri (Angas, 1871)

= Guraleus brazieri =

Species of gastropod

Guraleus brazieri is a species of sea snail, a marine gastropod mollusk in the family Mangeliidae.

== Description ==
The *Guraleus brazieri*, or 'Brazier’s turrid', is a sea snail with a thin, fusiform or subcylindrical shell. Its color varies from buff with possible chocolate spiral lines or bands to a complete chocolate hue. The shell's protoconch features two to three smooth helicoid whorls, and its overall sculpture includes either bold spaced ribs or fine close riblets, overlaid with fine, close threads that may be beaded or unbeaded. The aperture makes up about half the shell's length, with an outer lip that is slightly inflected and a short, open siphonal canal.

== Distribution ==
This gastropod is native and endemic to southeastern Australia, including the regions of New South Wales, Tasmania, and Victoria. It is typically found subtidally among rocks and seaweed. In Tasmania, it has been specifically recorded at Flinders Island, indicating its presence in this locale.
