= Guraleus fossa =

Scientific classification
- Kingdom: Animalia
- Phylum: Mollusca
- Class: Gastropoda
- Subclass: Caenogastropoda
- Order: Neogastropoda
- Superfamily: Conoidea
- Family: Mangeliidae
- Genus: Guraleus
- Species: G. fossa

Binomial name
- Guraleus fossa Laseron, 1954

Species of gastropod

Guraleus fossa is a species of sea snail, a marine gastropod mollusk in the family Mangeliidae.

== Description ==
The length of the shell attains 5 mm.

== Distribution ==
This marine species is endemic to Australia and can be found off New South Wales, Tasmania, Western Australia
