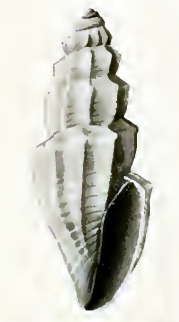
- Shell of Guraleus flavescens

Scientific classification
- Kingdom: Animalia
- Phylum: Mollusca
- Class: Gastropoda
- Subclass: Caenogastropoda
- Order: Neogastropoda
- Superfamily: Conoidea
- Family: Mangeliidae
- Genus: Guraleus
- Species: G. flavescens

Binomial name
- Guraleus flavescens (Angas, 1877)

Synonyms
- Guraleus (Guraleus) flavescens (Angas, 1877); Mangelia flavescens Angas, 1877 (original combination); Mangilia flavescens Angas, 1877

= Guraleus flavescens =

Species of gastropod

Guraleus flavescens is a species of sea snail, a marine gastropod mollusk in the family Mangeliidae.

== Description ==
(Original description) The shell is ovately fusiformly turreted, solid, pale buff, sometimes tinged with yellowish orange on the ribs. It contains 6½ whorls, conspicuously angled below the sutures and longitudinally distantly stoutly ribbed. The ribs are sharply nodulous at the angle, the lower half of the body whorl finely transversely ridged. The aperture is elongately ovate. The outer lip is flattened inwards. The posterior sinus is moderate, slanting upwards.

== Distribution ==
This marine species is endemic to Australia and can be found off Western Australia, New South Wales and Tasmania.
