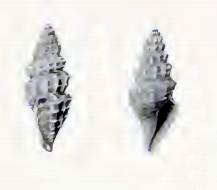
- Original image of two shells of Guraleus halmahericus

Scientific classification
- Kingdom: Animalia
- Phylum: Mollusca
- Class: Gastropoda
- Subclass: Caenogastropoda
- Order: Neogastropoda
- Superfamily: Conoidea
- Family: Mangeliidae
- Genus: Guraleus
- Species: G. halmahericus

Binomial name
- Guraleus halmahericus (M.M. Schepman, 1913)

Synonyms
- Mangilia halmaherica Schepman, 1913 (original combination)

= Guraleus halmahericus =

Species of gastropod

Guraleus halmahericus is a species of sea snail, a marine gastropod mollusk in the family Mangeliidae.

== Description ==
The length of the shell attains 7.5 mm, its width 3 mm.

(Original description) The fusiform, pellucid, white shell has a rather short siphonal canal. It contains about 8 whorls, of which about 3 form the protoconch, which is large, convexly-whorled, at first smooth and then axially ribbed;. The teleoconch whorls are angular and concave above. The sculpture consists of rather narrow axial ribs, about 12 or 13 on body whorl, crossed by spirals, of which one more or less strong one, just below the suture, another at the angle and one or two on the lower part. The body whorl with siphonal canal, with about 12 spirals, those on the upper whorls and 5 upper ones on body whorl are sharply tubercled in passing the ribs, those on the contracted part of body whorl and siphonal canal are more plain. Moreover, the whole shell is covered with fine growth lines. The aperture s elongately oval, angular above, with a rather short, wide siphonal canal below. The peristome is thin, with a moderately deep sinus above. The columellar margin is slightly concave above and is directed to the left below.

== Distribution ==
This marine species is endemic to Indonesia and can be found in the Halmahera Sea.
