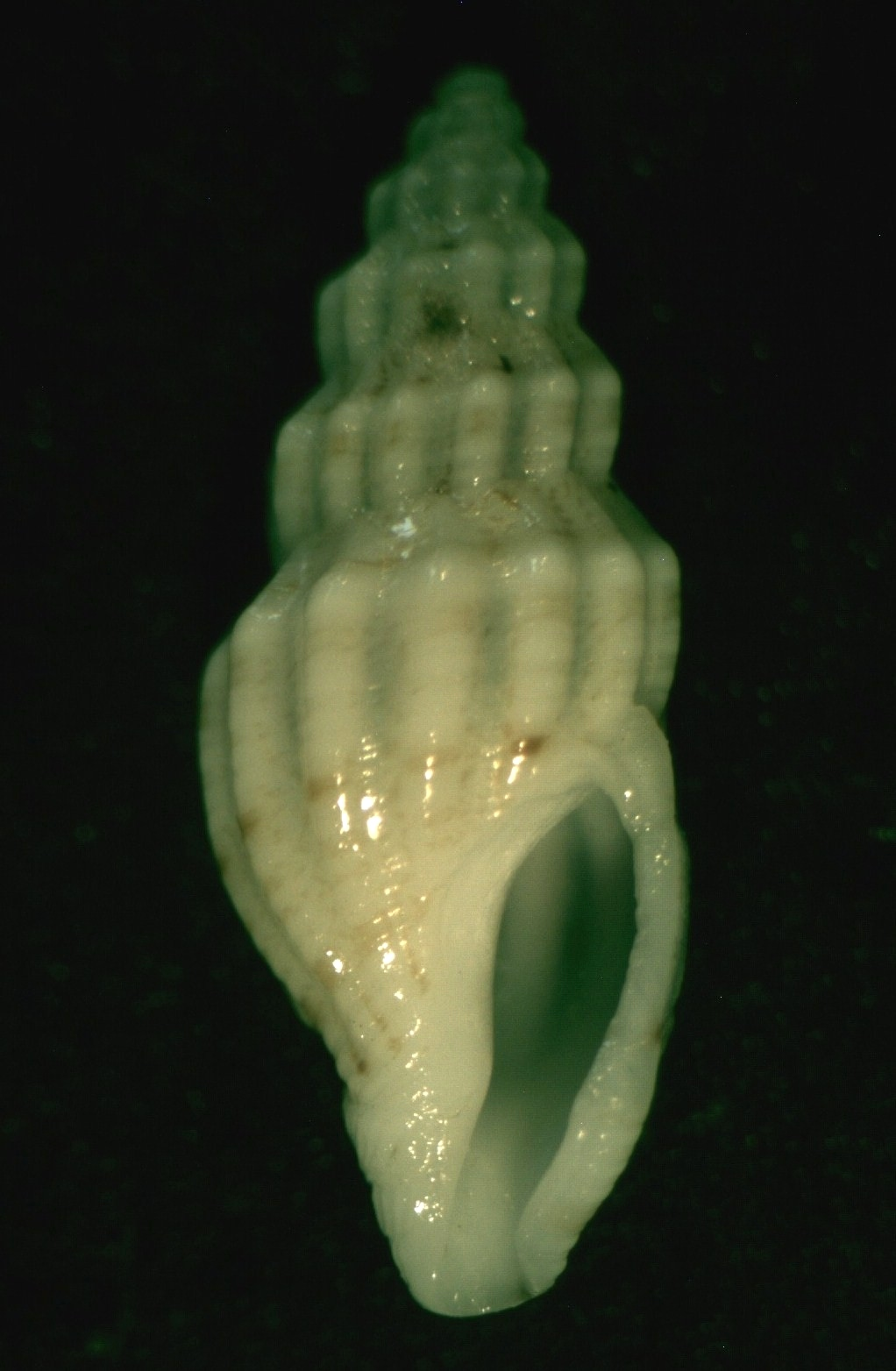
- Shell of Guraleus alucinans

Scientific classification
- Kingdom: Animalia
- Phylum: Mollusca
- Class: Gastropoda
- Subclass: Caenogastropoda
- Order: Neogastropoda
- Superfamily: Conoidea
- Family: Mangeliidae
- Genus: Guraleus
- Species: G. alucinans

Binomial name
- Guraleus alucinans (G. B. Sowerby III, 1896)

Synonyms
- Clathurella browniana Tate & May, 1901; Daphnella (Mangilia) alucinans (G. B. Sowerby III, 1896); Guraleus (Guraleus) pictus vincentinus (Crosse & Fischer, 1865); Mangilia alucinans G. B. Sowerby III, 1896 (original combination); Mangilia lineata Angas, 1865; Pleurotoma (Mangelia) vincentina Crosse & Fischer, 1865

= Guraleus alucinans =

Species of gastropod

Guraleus alucinans is a species of sea snail, a marine gastropod mollusk in the family Mangeliidae.

== Description ==
The length of the shell attains 12 mm, its diameter 3 mm.

(Original description) This is one of the most widespread and variable of Australian marine temperate gastropods. . The short fusiform shell contains 7–8 obtusely angulated whorls. This species may be distinguished by its thick, rounded, straight ribs. The spiral grooves are more or less distinct. Some specimens are nearly white; in others numerous sienna brown spiral lines, which extends from the angle down to the suture, cross the ribs, interrupted by the interstices, as in Guraleus pictus. There is generally a brown line just above the angle.

== Distribution ==
This marine species is endemic to Australia and can be found off South Australia and New South Wales.
