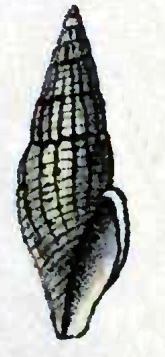
- Shell of Guraleus delicatulus

Scientific classification
- Kingdom: Animalia
- Phylum: Mollusca
- Class: Gastropoda
- Subclass: Caenogastropoda
- Order: Neogastropoda
- Superfamily: Conoidea
- Family: Mangeliidae
- Genus: Guraleus
- Species: G. delicatulus

Binomial name
- Guraleus delicatulus (Tenison-Woods, 1879)

Synonyms
- Daphnella delicatula G.W. Tryon, 1884; Guraleus (Guraleus) insculptus delicatulus (Tenison-Woods, 1879); Mangelia delicatula Tenison-Woods, 1879 (original combination)

= Guraleus delicatulus =

Species of gastropod

Guraleus delicatulus is a species of sea snail, a marine gastropod mollusk in the family Mangeliidae.

== Description ==
The length of the shell attains 9 mm.

The shell is subdiaphanous, shining; pale yellow, slenderly and irregularly zoned with red lines.

(Original description) The shell is small, narrowly fusiform, and turretted. It is subdiaphanous, shining, and pale yellow in color, featuring slender and irregular bands of red lines. In total, the shell consists of eight whorls, which includes three protoconch ones. These whorls slope and are obtusely angular at the top; they are also closely and neatly ribbed, as well as conspicuously spirally striate. The ribs are elevated, sloping, and continuous all the way to the well-impressed suture, with fourteen ribs present on the body whorl. The striae are somewhat widely spaced and pass directly over these ribs. Furthermore, the protoconch is smooth, fulvous, and polished, ending in a minutely obtuse apex. The shell's aperture is narrowly ovate and features a wide sinus. Finally, the outer lip is thin, acute, and exactly defined, leading into a wide and short siphonal canal.

== Distribution ==
This marine species is endemic to Australia and can be found off South Australia, Tasmania, and Victoria.
