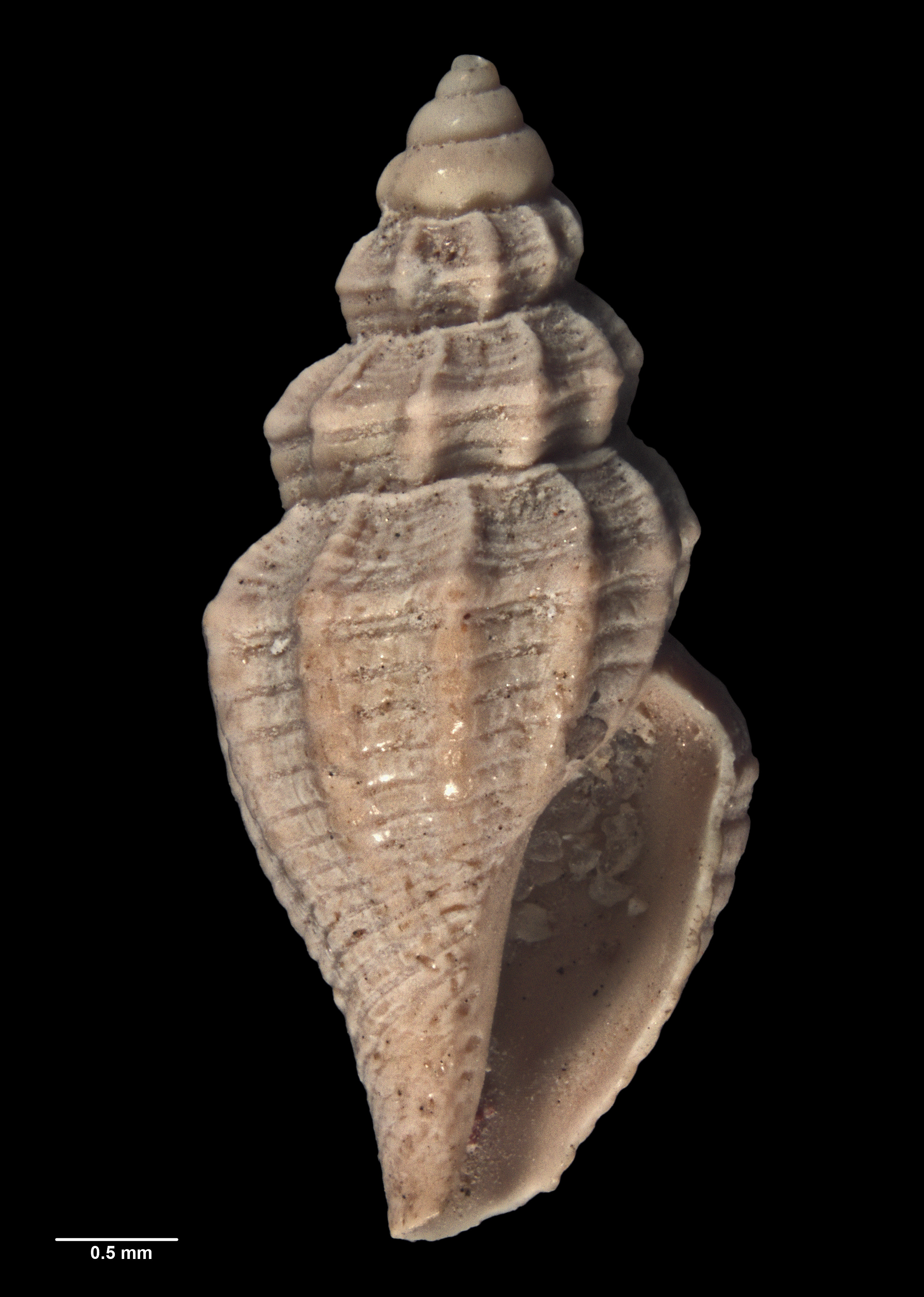
- Holotype from Auckland War Memorial Museum

Scientific classification
- Kingdom: Animalia
- Phylum: Mollusca
- Class: Gastropoda
- Subclass: Caenogastropoda
- Order: Neogastropoda
- Family: Mangeliidae
- Genus: Guraleus
- Species: †G. adelaidensis

Binomial name
- †Guraleus adelaidensis A. W. B. Powell, 1944

Synonyms
- Euguraleus adelaidensis (A. W. B. Powell, 1944); Guraleus (Euguraleus) adelaidensis (A. W. B. Powell, 1944)

= Guraleus adelaidensis =

Guraleus adelaidensis Temporal range: middle Miocene

Extinct species of gastropod

Guraleus adelaidensis is an extinct species of sea snail, a marine gastropod mollusc, in the family Mangeliidae. Fossils of the species date to middle Miocene strata of the St Vincent Basin of South Australia.

== Description ==
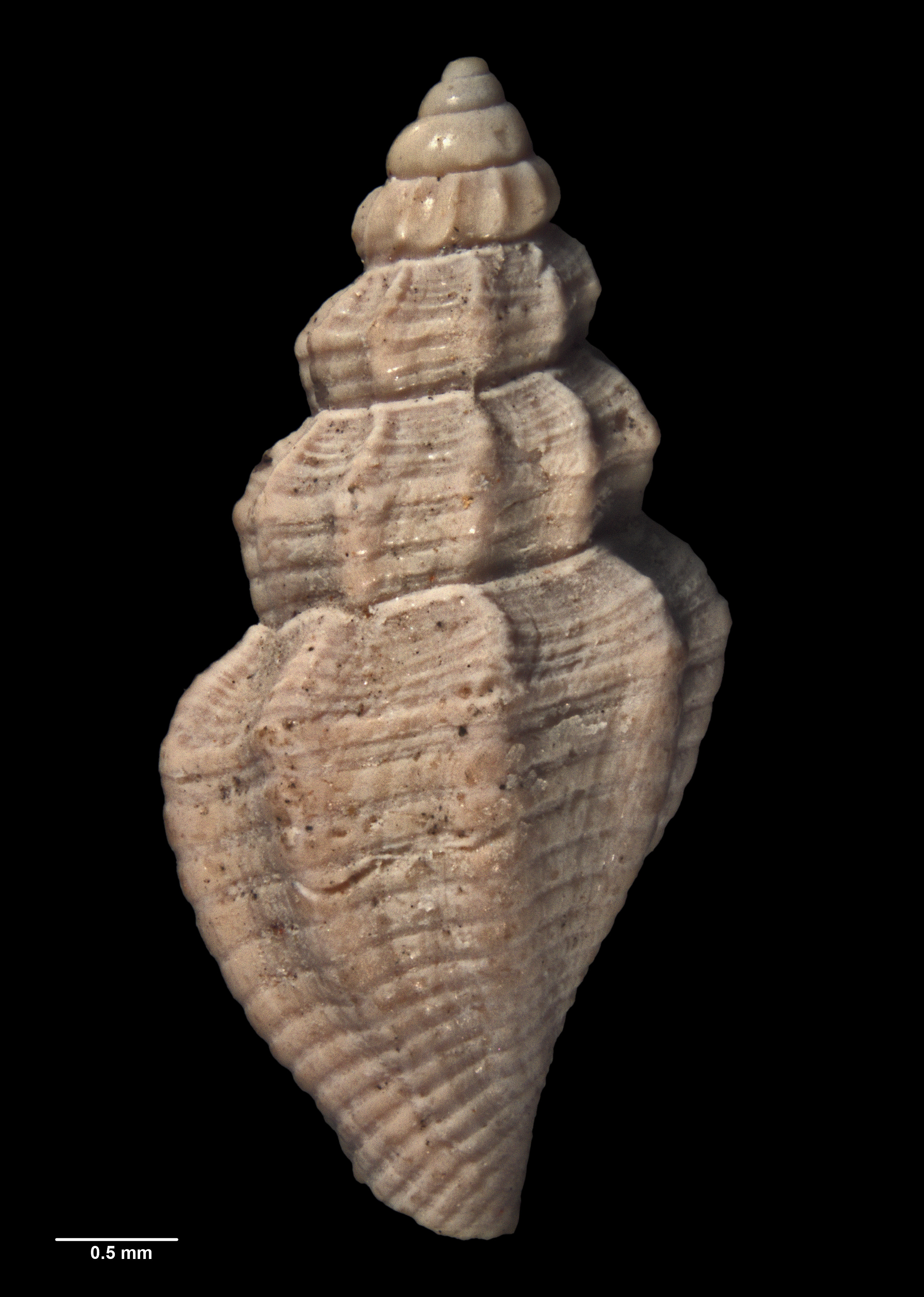
Reverse view of holotype

In the original description, Powell described the species as follows:

Related to subnitidus, having same style of incised spirals, but the shell is smaller, more solid, with a carinate periphery and only three cords on the spire-whorls, and about 19 on the base. There are 5 distinct lirations on the shoulder or sinus area. The uppermost of the three cords on the spire-whorls forms the sharp median peripheral carina. Protoconch polygyrate, conic, of 3 1/2 smooth whorls with minute exserted tip, followed by a half whorl of rather strong vertical brephic axials.

The holotype of the species measures 4.8 mm (0.19 in) in length and has a diameter of 2.1 mm (0.083 in). It is one of the smaller members of the genus Guraleus. The shell is fusiform, and the species can be distinguished due to there being ten axial costae on each whorl.

== Taxonomy ==
The species was first described by A. W. B. Powell in 1944. The holotype was collected by W. Howchin and J.C. Verco in 1919 from the Metropolitan Abattoirs Bore in Adelaide, South Australia, at a depth of between 122–152 m (400–499 ft). It is held in the collections of Auckland War Memorial Museum.

== Distribution ==
This extinct marine species occurs in middle Miocene strata of the St Vincent Basin of South Australia, including the Dry Creek Sands.
