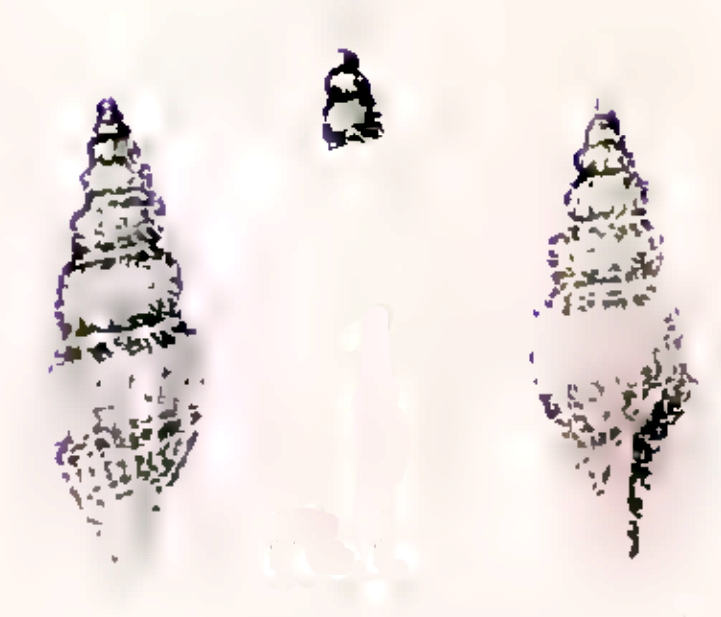
- Original drawing of a shell of Guraleus cuspis

Scientific classification
- Kingdom: Animalia
- Phylum: Mollusca
- Class: Gastropoda
- Subclass: Caenogastropoda
- Order: Neogastropoda
- Superfamily: Conoidea
- Family: Mangeliidae
- Genus: Guraleus
- Species: G. cuspis

Binomial name
- Guraleus cuspis (G. B. Sowerby III, 1896)

Synonyms
- Guraleus (Guraleus) cuspis (G.B. Sowerby III, 1897); Mangilia cuspis G. B. Sowerby III, 1896 (original combination)

= Guraleus cuspis =

Species of gastropod

Guraleus cuspis is a species of sea snail, a marine gastropod mollusk in the family Mangeliidae.

Subspecies

- Guraleus (Guraleus) cuspis connectens (G.B. Sowerby, III, 1897) (synonym: Mangilia connectens G.B. Sowerby III, 1896)

== Description ==
The length of the shell attains 8.5 mm, its diameter 3 mm.

(Original description) The white, fusiform shell is acuminate on both sides. It contains 8 whorls, of which 3 polished whorls n the protoconch. The others are obtusely angulate and crossed by many spiral lirae. The shell shows many opisthocline ribs. The body whorl is at the top slightly concave, but otherwise slightly convex. The columella is delicately contorted. The aperture is elongated. The outer lip is thin and backwards slightly sinuate. .

== Distribution ==
This marine species is endemic to Australia and can be found off South Australia, Tasmania, Victoria and Western Australia
