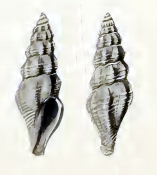
- Original image of a shell of Guraleus savuensis

Scientific classification
- Kingdom: Animalia
- Phylum: Mollusca
- Class: Gastropoda
- Subclass: Caenogastropoda
- Order: Neogastropoda
- Superfamily: Conoidea
- Family: Mangeliidae
- Genus: Guraleus
- Species: G. savuensis

Binomial name
- Guraleus savuensis (M.M. Schepman, 1913)

Synonyms
- Guraleus (Euguraleus) savuensis (Schepman, 1913); Mangilia savuensis Schepman, 1913 (original combination)

= Guraleus savuensis =

Species of gastropod

Guraleus savuensis is a species of sea snail, a marine gastropod mollusk in the family Mangeliidae.

== Description ==
The length of the shell attains 9 mm, its width 3 mm.

(Original description) The shell is elongately fusiform, with a rather short siphonal canal. It is rather strong, yellowish-white, with traces of red-brown bands (bleached). It contains scarcely 9 whorls, of which about 3 form a convexly whorled protoconch. Of these about the upper one is smooth, the rest at first faintly, then strongly ribbed, with numerous elegant ribs and traces of a keel near the base of visible part of last nuclear whorl. The subsequent whorls are angularly convex, separated by a deep, strongly waved suture. The sculpture consists of rounded, not continuous, axial ribs, 7 in number on the body whorl, crossed by spirals, of which a faint crenulated one, just below the suture, another strong one at the periphery, making the ribs slightly tubercled, and 3 spirals below it on penultimate whorl, 16 on the body whorl and siphonal canal, moreover a few very faint spirals above the periphery and numerous growth lines. The aperture is elongately oval, with a sharp angle above and a rather wide siphonal canal below. The peristome is broken, probably with a rather shallow sinus above. The columellar margin is nearly straight, with a thin layer of enamel.

== Distribution ==
This marine species is endemic to Indonesia and can be found in the Savu Sea.
