= Guraleus anisus =

Scientific classification
- Kingdom: Animalia
- Phylum: Mollusca
- Class: Gastropoda
- Subclass: Caenogastropoda
- Order: Neogastropoda
- Superfamily: Conoidea
- Family: Mangeliidae
- Genus: Guraleus
- Species: G. anisus

Binomial name
- Guraleus anisus (B.C. Cotton, 1947)

Synonyms
- Euguraleus anisus Cotton, 1947 (original combination); Guraleus (Euguraleus) anisus (Cotton, 1947)

Species of gastropod

Guraleus anisus is a species of sea snail, a marine gastropod mollusk in the family Mangeliidae.

== Distribution ==
This marine species is endemic to Australia and can be found off New South Wales, South Australia and Tasmania.
