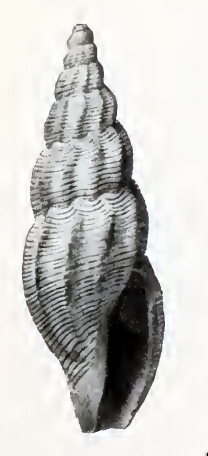
- Shell of Guraleus amplexus

Scientific classification
- Kingdom: Animalia
- Phylum: Mollusca
- Class: Gastropoda
- Subclass: Caenogastropoda
- Order: Neogastropoda
- Superfamily: Conoidea
- Family: Mangeliidae
- Genus: Guraleus
- Species: G. amplexus

Binomial name
- Guraleus amplexus (A.A. Gould, 1860)

Synonyms
- Anacithara amplexa (Gould, 1860); Clathurella amplexa Gould, 1860 (original combination); Cythara amplexa (Gould, 1860); Defrancia amplexa (Gould, 1860); Haedropleura thea Thiele, J., 1925; Mangelia rietensis (Turton, 1932); Mangilia amplexa (Gould, 1860); Mangilia humerosa Bartsch, P., 1915; Mangilia rietensis Turton, W.H., 1932

= Guraleus amplexus =

Species of gastropod

Guraleus amplexus is a species of sea snail, a marine gastropod mollusk in the family Mangeliidae.

== Description ==
The length of the shell attains 8 mm, its diameter 2.5 mm.

(Original description by Bartsch) The shell is elongate-conic, white or cream-yellow. The protoconch contains 2½ whorls, well rounded and smooth. The 5 teleoconch whorls are strongly rounded. They are provided with decidedly sinuous, strong, protractively slanting, almost sublamellar, axial ribs, of which 14 occur upon the first three and 12 upon the remaining whorls. These ribs are about one-third as wide as the spaces which separate them. In addition to the ribs, the whorls are marked by narrow, deeply incised, spiral sulci, which are about one-third as wide as the flat spaces that separate them. The increase in these sulci from the early whorls to the later takes place by the intercalation of new sulci in the flat spaces, which usually begin as fine incised striations. Of these sulci 6 occur upon the first, 10 upon the second, 17 upon the third, 14 upon the fourth, and 19 upon the penultimate whorl. The periphery of the body whorl is well rounded. The base of the shell is protracted, marked by the strong continuations of the axial ribs, which become evanescent at the insertion of the columella, and 23 incised spiral sulci, which are a little more distantly spaced on the columella than on the posterior half of the base. The aperture is decidedly channeled anteriorly, posteriorly with a strong notch immediately below the suture.

== Distribution ==
This marine species occurs at Simon's Bay, South Africa.
