= Guraleus tokunagae =

Scientific classification
- Kingdom: Animalia
- Phylum: Mollusca
- Class: Gastropoda
- Subclass: Caenogastropoda
- Order: Neogastropoda
- Superfamily: Conoidea
- Family: Mangeliidae
- Genus: Guraleus
- Species: G. tokunagae

Binomial name
- Guraleus tokunagae (Finlay, H.J., 1926)

Synonyms
- Mangilia (Guraleus) tokunagae Finlay, 1926

Species of gastropod

Guraleus tokunagae is a species of sea snail, a marine gastropod mollusk in the family Mangeliidae.

== Distribution ==
This marine species occurs off Japan.
