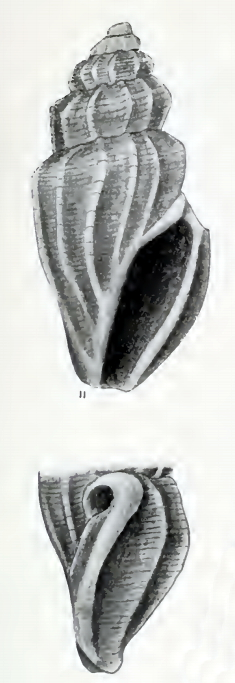
- Original image of a shell of Guraleus kamakuranus

Scientific classification
- Kingdom: Animalia
- Phylum: Mollusca
- Class: Gastropoda
- Subclass: Caenogastropoda
- Order: Neogastropoda
- Superfamily: Conoidea
- Family: Mangeliidae
- Genus: Guraleus
- Species: G. kamakuranus

Binomial name
- Guraleus kamakuranus (Pilsbry, 1904)

Synonyms
- Mangilia kamakurana Pilsbry, 1904 (original combination)

= Guraleus kamakuranus =

Species of gastropod

Guraleus kamakuranus is a species of sea snail, a marine gastropod mollusk in the family Mangeliidae.

== Description ==
The length of the shell attains 5.5 mm, its diameter 2 mm.

(Original description) The shell is very small. Its color is white with a brown spot in the middle of the lip varix. The spire is terraced, the lower half conic. The sculpture consists of slightly curved obliquely longitudinal ribs, 11 on the body whorl, the last one, behind the lip, much larger. These are crossed by spaced spiral threads, with, smaller threads between them, the intervals still more finely striate spirally. The shell contains 5 whorls (the embryonic ones broken off), strongly angular near the middle, flattened and sloping above the angle, contracting below it. The body whorl is similarly angular, convex below the angle, contracted near the base. The aperture is oblong. The columellar margin is concave above the middle. The outer lip is thick, with a moderately deep rounded sinus above; smooth within.

== Distribution ==
This marine species occurs off Japan and Korea.
