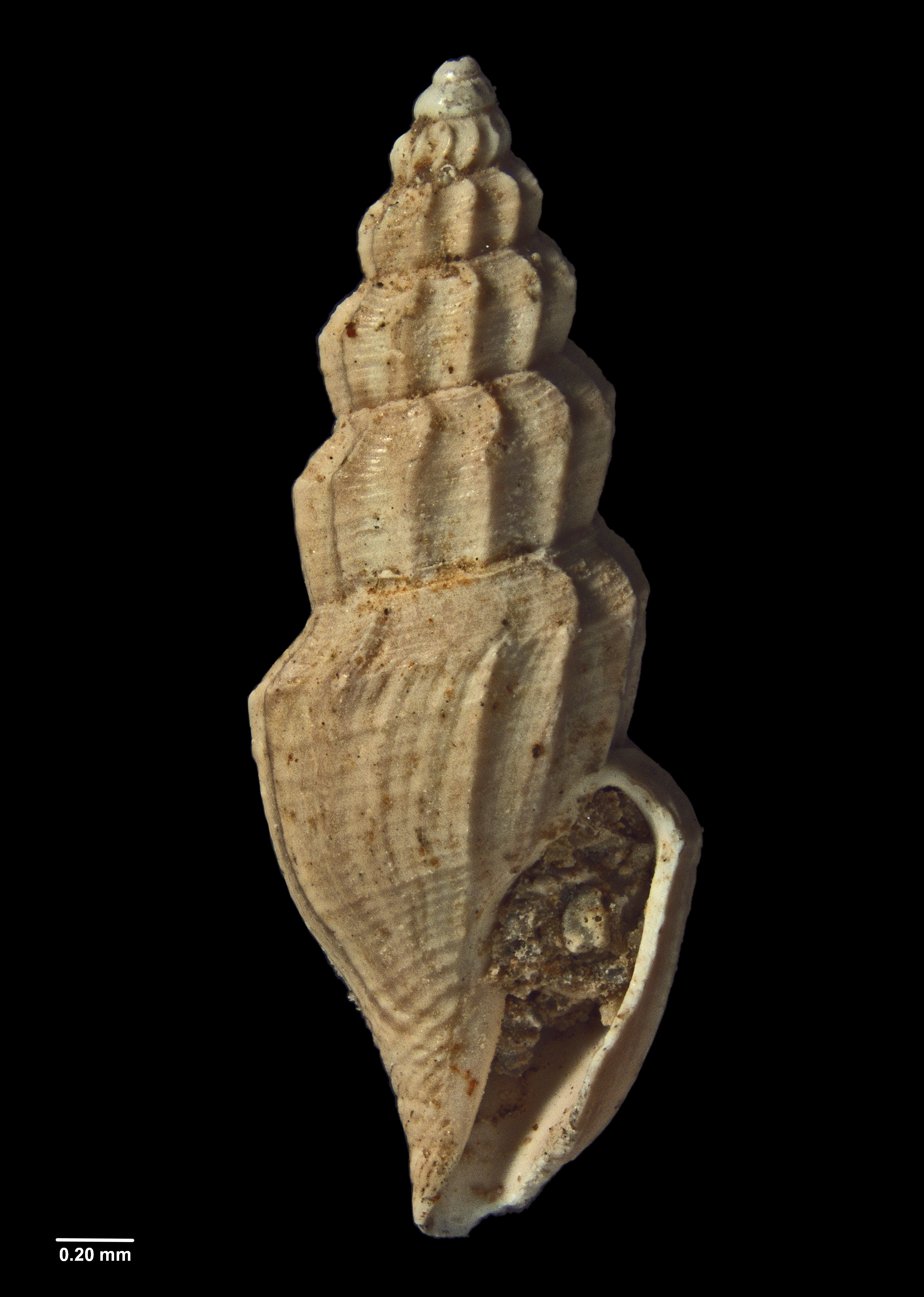
- Holotype from Auckland War Memorial Museum

Scientific classification
- Kingdom: Animalia
- Phylum: Mollusca
- Class: Gastropoda
- Subclass: Caenogastropoda
- Order: Neogastropoda
- Family: Mangeliidae
- Genus: Guraleus
- Species: †G. singletoni

Binomial name
- †Guraleus singletoni A. W. B. Powell, 1944

= Guraleus singletoni =

Guraleus singletoni Temporal range: early Pliocene

Extinct species of gastropod

Guraleus singletoni is an extinct species of sea snail, a marine gastropod mollusc, in the family Mangeliidae. Fossils of the species date to early Pliocene strata of the St Vincent Basin of South Australia and the Otway Basin of South Australia and Victoria, including the Grange Burn Formation near Hamilton, Victoria.

== Description ==
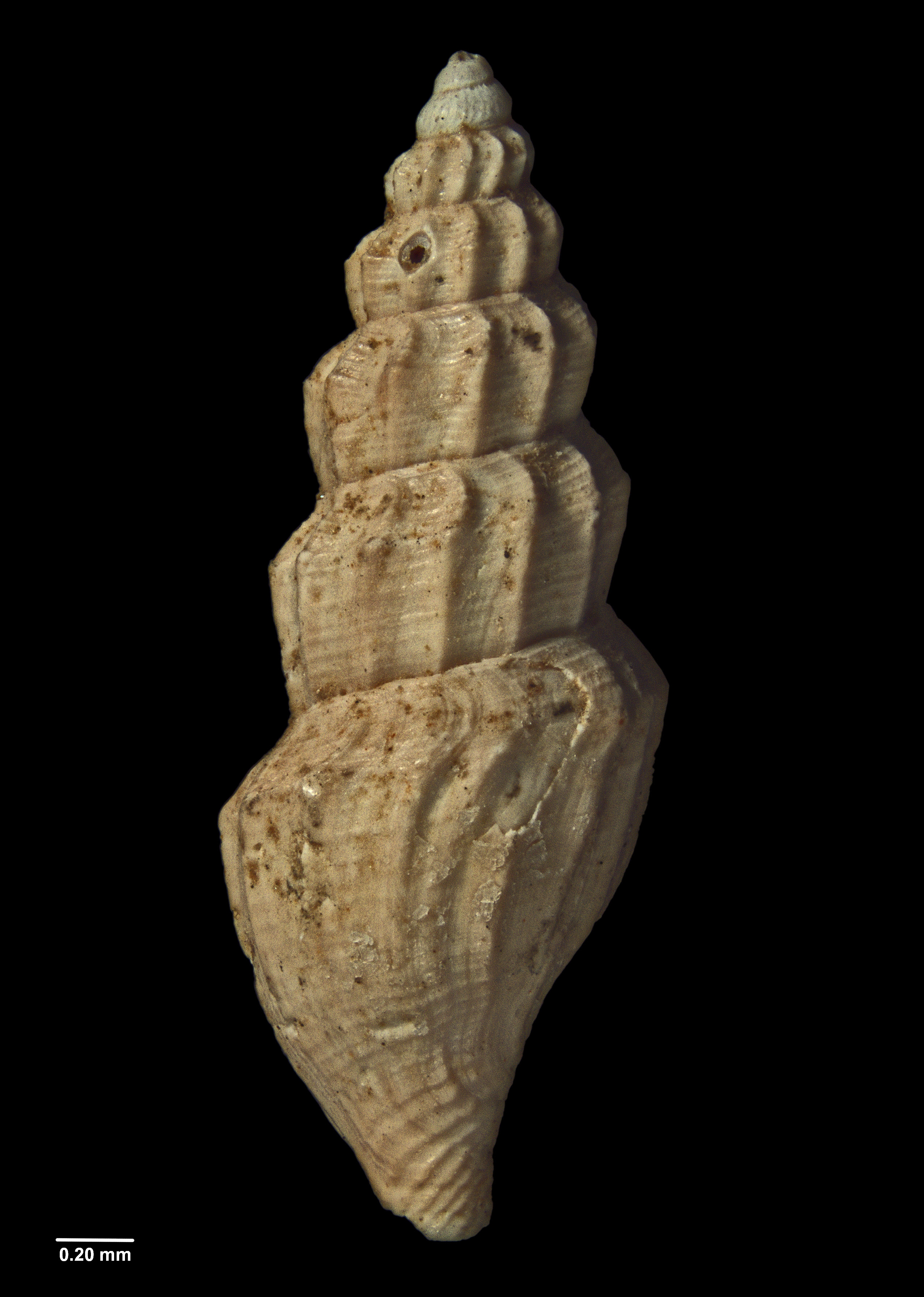
Reverse view of holotype

In the original description, Powell described the species as follows:

Fusiform, with tall turreted spire. Whorls sharply angled at about two-thirds whorl height. Axials narrow, 11 per whorl, weak over shoulder, vertical on spire-whorls but arcuate and irregular over body-whorl; extending from upper suture completely over base. Spiral sculpture consisting of 4 or 5 weak threads on the shoulder and 7 weak, slightly irregular cords from the shoulder angle to lower suture. On the body-whorl the spiral cords are numerous, linear-spaced but weak, the most distinct being 12 on the anterior end. Protoconch polygyrate, conic, of 3 smooth whorls, followed by a half whorl of fine brephic axials.

The holotype of the species measures 6.5 mm (0.26 in) in length and has a diameter of 2.5 mm (0.098 in).

== Taxonomy ==
The species was first described by A. W. B. Powell in 1944. The holotype was collected at an unknown date prior to 1945 from the Grange Burn Formation near Hamilton, Victoria. It is held in the collections of Auckland War Memorial Museum.

== Distribution ==
This extinct marine species occurs in early Pliocene strata of the Otway Basin of South Australia and Victoria, including the Grange Burn Formation of Victoria.
