= Guraleus florus =

Scientific classification
- Kingdom: Animalia
- Phylum: Mollusca
- Class: Gastropoda
- Subclass: Caenogastropoda
- Order: Neogastropoda
- Superfamily: Conoidea
- Family: Mangeliidae
- Genus: Guraleus
- Species: G. florus

Binomial name
- Guraleus florus (B.C. Cotton, 1947)

Synonyms
- Guraleus (Guraleus) florus B.C. Cotton, 1947

Species of gastropod

Guraleus florus is a species of sea snails, a marine gastropod mollusk in the family Mangeliidae.

== Distribution ==
This marine species is endemic to Australia and can be found off Western Australia and Tasmania.
