= Guraleus thornleyanus =

Scientific classification
- Kingdom: Animalia
- Phylum: Mollusca
- Class: Gastropoda
- Subclass: Caenogastropoda
- Order: Neogastropoda
- Superfamily: Conoidea
- Family: Mangeliidae
- Genus: Guraleus
- Species: G. thornleyanus

Binomial name
- Guraleus thornleyanus Laseron, 1954

Synonyms
- Euguraleus thornleyanus Laseron, 1954 (original combination); Guraleus (Euguraleus) thornleyanus Laseron, 1954

Species of gastropod

Guraleus thornleyanus is a species of sea snail, a marine gastropod mollusk in the family Mangeliidae.

== Distribution ==
This marine species is endemic to Australia and can be found off New South Wales and Tasmania.
