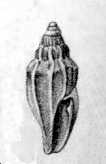
- Original image of a shell of Guraleus tabatensis

Scientific classification
- Kingdom: Animalia
- Phylum: Mollusca
- Class: Gastropoda
- Subclass: Caenogastropoda
- Order: Neogastropoda
- Superfamily: Conoidea
- Family: Mangeliidae
- Genus: Guraleus
- Species: G. tabatensis

Binomial name
- Guraleus tabatensis (Tokunaga, 1906)

Synonyms
- Pleurotoma (Drillia) tabatensis Tokunaga, 1906

= Guraleus tabatensis =

Species of gastropod

Guraleus tabatensis is a species of sea snail, a marine gastropod mollusk in the family Mangeliidae.

== Description ==
The length of the shell attains 4 mm, its diameter 1.5 mm.

(Original description) This very rare shell contains six whorls, the upper three smooth, the rest about coarsely (about right) longitudinally costated with no trace of transverse ribs. The shell is distinctly angulated at the shoulder. The aperture is long and measures a little shorter than half the height of the shell.

== Distribution ==
This marine species occurs off Japan. It has also been found as a fossil in the Tabata region, near Tokyo.
