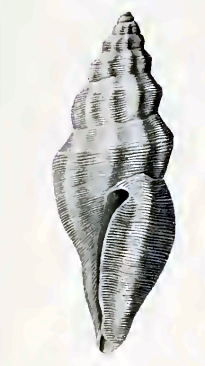
- Shell of Guraleus fascinus

Scientific classification
- Kingdom: Animalia
- Phylum: Mollusca
- Class: Gastropoda
- Subclass: Caenogastropoda
- Order: Neogastropoda
- Superfamily: Conoidea
- Family: Mangeliidae
- Genus: Guraleus
- Species: G. fascinus

Binomial name
- Guraleus fascinus Hedley, 1922

Synonyms
- Guraleus (Guraleus) fascinus Hedley, 1922

= Guraleus fascinus =

Species of gastropod

Guraleus fascinus is a species of sea snail, a marine gastropod mollusk in the family Mangeliidae.

Subspecies
Guraleus fascinus stephenensis Hedley, 1922

== Description ==
The length of the shell attains 9 mm, its diameter 4 mm.

(Original description) The shell is elongate-fusiform. The body whorl measures about half of total length. The whorls are angled at the shoulder.

Colour :—The type is cream-buff monochrome. Another specimen is brown-buff, with a pale band on the base, and another on the anterior extremity, and with every fourth spiral paler than the rest. Another specimen is white, with an orange-brown zone on the base.

The shell contains 8 whorls, including a three-whorled protoconch. The sutures are linear.

Sculpture:—Conspicuous ribs descend continuously from whorl to whorl at the rate of twelve to the penultimate whorl. On the body whorl the ribs become gradually smaller, and vanish on the base. The whole surface is overrun by minute, closely packed, even, sharp spiral threads.

Aperture :—The mouth is rather wide. The outer lip shows a low varix and a thin expanded free edge, which is insinuate at the base. The siphonal canal is short;. The sinus is wide and shallow.

== Distribution ==
This marine species is endemic to Australia and can be found off New South Wales, Tasmania and Western Australia.
