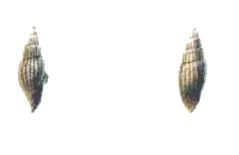
- Original image of a shell of Guraleus deshayesii

Scientific classification
- Kingdom: Animalia
- Phylum: Mollusca
- Class: Gastropoda
- Subclass: Caenogastropoda
- Order: Neogastropoda
- Superfamily: Conoidea
- Family: Mangeliidae
- Genus: Guraleus
- Species: G. deshayesii

Binomial name
- Guraleus deshayesii (Dunker, 1860)

Synonyms
- Mangelia rikuzenica Nomura, S. & N. Zinbo, 1940; Mangilia (Pleurotoma) deshayesii Dunker, 1860

= Guraleus deshayesii =

Species of gastropod

Guraleus deshayesii is a species of sea snail, a marine gastropod mollusk in the family Mangeliidae.

== Description ==
The length of the oblong, subfusiform, dirty white shell varies between 10 mm and 51 mm. The whorls are slightly subangulate. The longitudinal ribs are crossed by raised transverse striae. The aperture is oblong. The outer lip is incrassate and covered with transverse marks and marked with a red spot.

== Distribution ==
This marine species occurs off Fiji and Japan.
