= Guraleus diacritus =

Scientific classification
- Kingdom: Animalia
- Phylum: Mollusca
- Class: Gastropoda
- Subclass: Caenogastropoda
- Order: Neogastropoda
- Superfamily: Conoidea
- Family: Mangeliidae
- Genus: Guraleus
- Species: G. diacritus

Binomial name
- Guraleus diacritus (B.C. Cotton, 1947)

Synonyms
- Guraleus (Guraleus) diacritus B.C. Cotton, 1947

Species of mollusc

Guraleus diacritus is a species of sea snail, a marine gastropod mollusk in the family Mangeliidae.

== Distribution ==
This marine species is endemic to Australia and can be found off South Australia, Western Australia and Tasmania.
