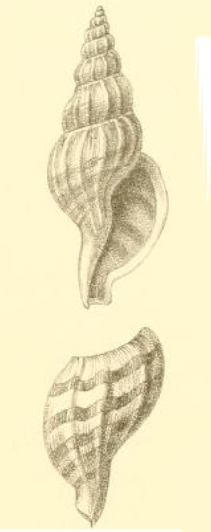
- Shell of Guraleus verhoeffeni (holotype)

Scientific classification
- Kingdom: Animalia
- Phylum: Mollusca
- Class: Gastropoda
- Subclass: Caenogastropoda
- Order: Neogastropoda
- Superfamily: Conoidea
- Family: Mangeliidae
- Genus: Guraleus
- Species: G. verhoeffeni

Binomial name
- Guraleus verhoeffeni (von Martens, 1904)

Synonyms
- Mangilia (Cithara) verhoeffeni E. von Martens, 1904 superseded combination; Mangilia verhoeffeni Martens, 1904 (original combination)

= Guraleus verhoeffeni =

Species of gastropod

Guraleus verhoeffeni is a species of sea snail, a marine gastropod mollusk in the family Mangeliidae.

== Description ==
The length of the shell attains 20 mm, its diameter 7.5 mm.

(Original description in Latin) The shell is ovate-oblong, vertically ribbed, otherwise smooth, thin, and whitish. It is painted with 4 rather broad, pale brown bands. The spire is conically elongated. It has 8 whorls: the first is smooth and brownish, the succeeding 2-6 are very convex, and the penultimate and ultimate are less convex. The penultimate whorl has 12 vertical ribs, and the ultimate has 13; the latter is gradually attenuated at the base, with a rather deep suture. The aperture equals the spire, is narrowly elliptical, with its outer margin arcuately sinuous at the suture above, then slightly arcuately thickened, broadly varicose, and edentate. The siphonal canal is well-defined, quite short, widely open, and scarcely resupinate. The columellar margin is smooth, quite concave above, appressed, and as if abraded.

== Distribution ==
This marine species occurs off Western Sumatra, Indonesia.
