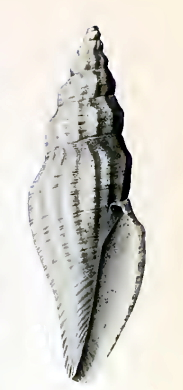
- Shell of Guraleus tasmanicus

Scientific classification
- Kingdom: Animalia
- Phylum: Mollusca
- Class: Gastropoda
- Subclass: Caenogastropoda
- Order: Neogastropoda
- Superfamily: Conoidea
- Family: Mangeliidae
- Genus: Guraleus
- Species: G. tasmanicus

Binomial name
- Guraleus tasmanicus (Tenison-Woods, 1876)

Synonyms
- Cithara tasmanica Tenison-Woods, 1876 (original combination); Cythara tasmanica Tenison-Woods, 1876; Cythara maccoyi Petterd, 1879; Euguraleus tasmanicus (Tenison Woods, 1876) superseded combination; Guraleus (Euguraleus) tasmanicus tasmanicus (Tenison-Woods, 1876); Guraleus jacksonensis (Angas, 1877) junior subjective synonym; Mangelia alternata Tenison Woods, 1879; Mangelia jacksonensis Angas, 1877 junior subjective synonym; Mangilia alternata Tenison-Woods, 1879

= Guraleus tasmanicus =

Species of gastropod

Guraleus tasmanicus is a species of sea snail, a marine gastropod mollusk in the family Mangeliidae.

== Description ==
The length of the shell attains 12 mm, its diameter 5 mm.

(Original description) The shell is fusiform, attenuate at both ends, ivory white, between the lirae tinged with very pale red. The spire is raised and longer than the aperture. The shell contains 7 whorls, convex, angular behind and excavate above. They are elegantly ribbed lengthwise (12–14 in body whorl), transversely regularly lirate. The ribs are angular, smooth, shining. The lirae are broad and flattened. The aperture is narrowly ovate. The outer lip is thin.

(Original description as Guraleus jacksonensis) The shell is elongately fusiformly turreted, solid, pale fulvous yellow. It contains 7 whorls, angulated and flattened at the upper part. The shell is longitudinally somewhat prominently ribbed, the ribs slightly nodulous at the angle of the whorl, the interstices crossed with narrow grooved lines in pairs, which are interrupted by the longitudinal ribs. The aperture is elongately ovate. The thin outer lip is simple. The base of the columella is sometimes tinged with brown. The posterior sinus is very shallow.

== Distribution ==
This marine species is endemic to Australia and can be found off New South Wales, South Australia, Tasmania and Victoria.
