= Marita insculpta =

Scientific classification
- Kingdom: Animalia
- Phylum: Mollusca
- Class: Gastropoda
- Subclass: Caenogastropoda
- Order: Neogastropoda
- Superfamily: Conoidea
- Family: Mangeliidae
- Genus: Marita
- Species: M. insculpta

Binomial name
- Marita insculpta (A. Adams & Angas, 1864)

Synonyms
- Clathurella insculpta Boettger, 1904 (doubtful synonym); Guraleus insculptus (A. Adams & Angas, 1864); Mangelia insculpta Adams & Angas, 1864 (original combination); Mangilia insculpta (A. Adams & Angas, 1864)

Species of gastropod

Marita insculpta is a species of sea snail, a marine gastropod mollusk in the family Mangeliidae.

== Description ==
The length of the shell attains 6 mm.

The shell is closely longitudinally plicate. The ribs form a slight posterior shoulder or angle, interstices with revolving lirae. The color of the shell is light yellowish brown, darker in the grooves.

== Distribution ==
This marine species is endemic to Australia and occurs off South Australia and Victoria.
