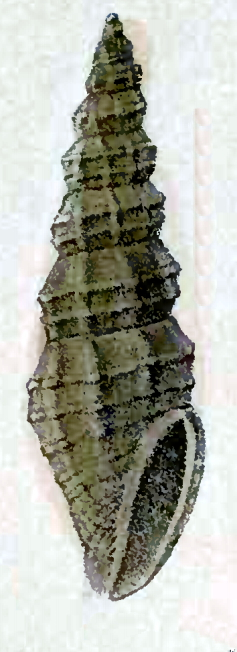
- Drawing of a shell of Guraleus lallemantianus

Scientific classification
- Kingdom: Animalia
- Phylum: Mollusca
- Class: Gastropoda
- Subclass: Caenogastropoda
- Order: Neogastropoda
- Superfamily: Conoidea
- Family: Mangeliidae
- Genus: Guraleus
- Species: G. lallemantianus

Binomial name
- Guraleus lallemantianus (Crosse & Fischer, 1865)

Synonyms
- Clathurella lallemantiana (Crosse & Fischer, 1865); Guraleus (Guraleus) lallemantianus (Crosse & Fischer, 1865); Mangelia lallemantiana Angas, 1877; Pleurotoma lallemantiana Crosse & Fischer, 1865 (original combination)

= Guraleus lallemantianus =

Species of gastropod

Guraleus lallemantianus is a species of sea snail, a marine gastropod mollusk in the family Mangeliidae.

== Description ==
The length of the shell attains 12 mm. Two of the revolving lines more prominent, ridge-like. The color of the shell is yellowish brown, or light reddish brown.

== Distribution ==
This marine species is endemic to Australia and can be found off South Australia, Victoria and Tasmania.
