= Guraleus wilesianus =

Scientific classification
- Kingdom: Animalia
- Phylum: Mollusca
- Class: Gastropoda
- Subclass: Caenogastropoda
- Order: Neogastropoda
- Superfamily: Conoidea
- Family: Mangeliidae
- Genus: Guraleus
- Species: G. wilesianus

Binomial name
- Guraleus wilesianus Hedley, 1922

Synonyms
- Antiguraleus wilesianus (Hedley, 1922); Guraleus costatus var. wilesianus Hedley, 1922 (original combination)

Species of gastropod

Guraleus wilesianus is a species of sea snail, a marine gastropod mollusk in the family Mangeliidae.

== Description ==
The length of the shell attains 10 mm, its diameter 3 mm.

(Original description) The shell has the same characteristics as in Guraleus costatus, but it is more slender in contour, and develops spiral striae on the intercostal spaces of the upper whorls.

== Distribution ==
This marine species is endemic to Australia and can be found off South Australia, Australia.
