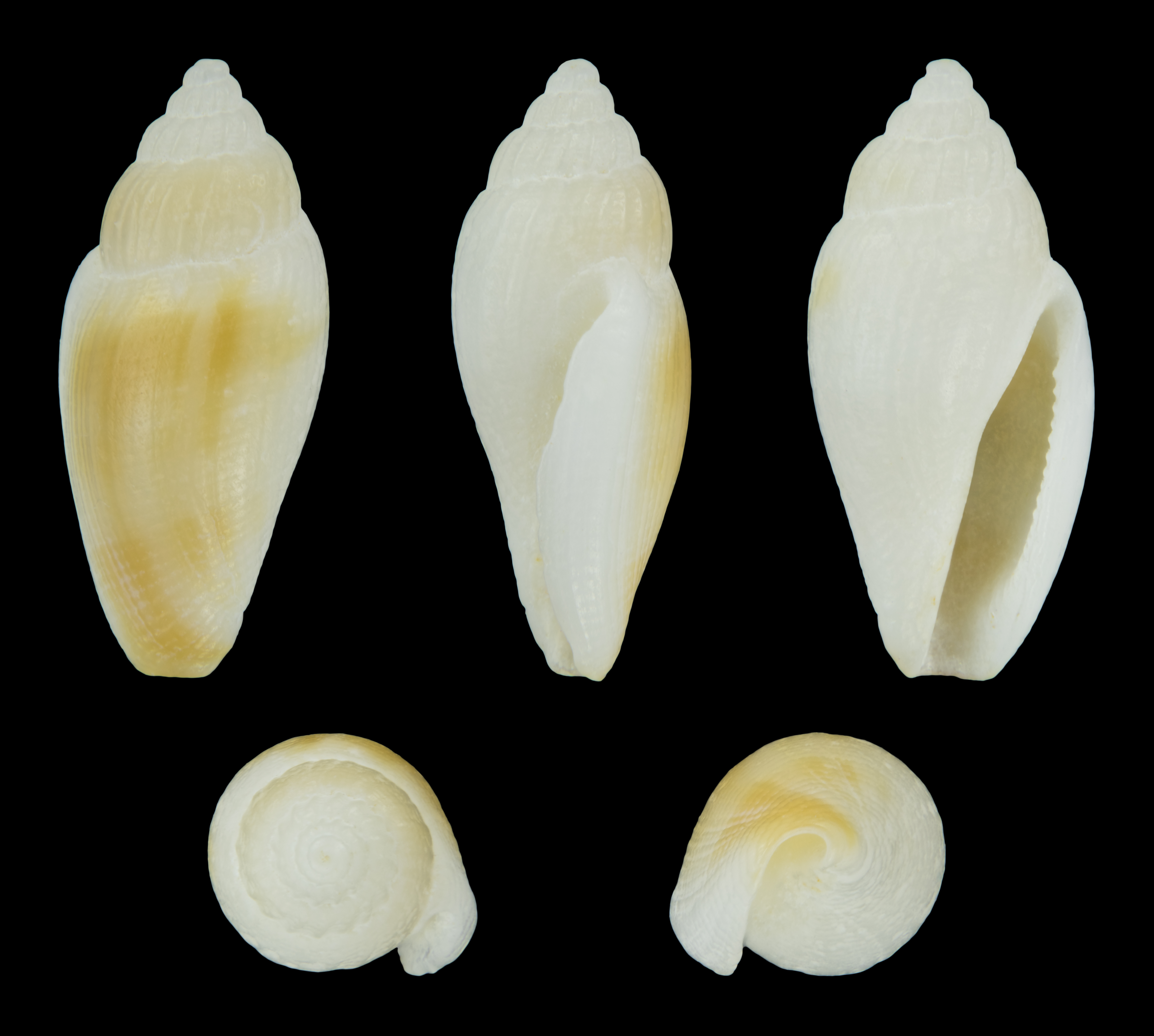
- Shell of Marita compta

Scientific classification
- Kingdom: Animalia
- Phylum: Mollusca
- Class: Gastropoda
- Subclass: Caenogastropoda
- Order: Neogastropoda
- Superfamily: Conoidea
- Family: Mangeliidae
- Genus: Marita
- Species: M. compta

Binomial name
- Marita compta (A. Adams & Angas, 1864)

Synonyms
- Cithara compta A. Adams & Angas, 1864 (original combination); Clathurella peregrina Gould, 1860 (uncertain synonym); Daphnella compta (A. Adams & Angas, 1864); Daphnella varix Tenison-Woods, 1877; Eucithara compta (A. Adams & Angas, 1864); Guraleus comptus (A. Adams & Angas, 1864); Marita peregrina A.A. Gould, 1860; Marita varix J.E. Tenison-Woods, 1877

= Marita compta =

Species of gastropod

Marita compta is a species of sea snail, a marine gastropod mollusk in the family Mangeliidae.

== Description ==
The length of the shell attains 12 mm.

The spire and the upper part of the body whorl are longitudinally plicate, crossed by fine close revolving lines. The outer lip is acute, unarmed, widely but not deeply sinuous behind. The color of the shell is light yellowish or whitish, maculated more or less with chestnut.

== Distribution ==
This marine species is endemic to Australia and occurs off New South Wales, South Australia, Tasmania, Victoria and Western Australia
