= Mangelia vulgata =

Scientific classification
- Kingdom: Animalia
- Phylum: Mollusca
- Class: Gastropoda
- Subclass: Caenogastropoda
- Order: Neogastropoda
- Superfamily: Conoidea
- Family: Mangeliidae
- Genus: Mangelia
- Species: M. vulgata

Binomial name
- Mangelia vulgata J. Thiele, 1925

Synonyms
- Guraleus vulgata (J. Thiele., 1925)

Species of gastropod

Mangelia vulgata is a species of sea snail, a marine gastropod mollusk in the family Mangeliidae.

This is a taxon inquirendum.

== Description ==
The length of the shell attains 5 mm.

== Distribution ==
This marine species occurs off Western Sumatra, Indonesia, and off Réunion.
