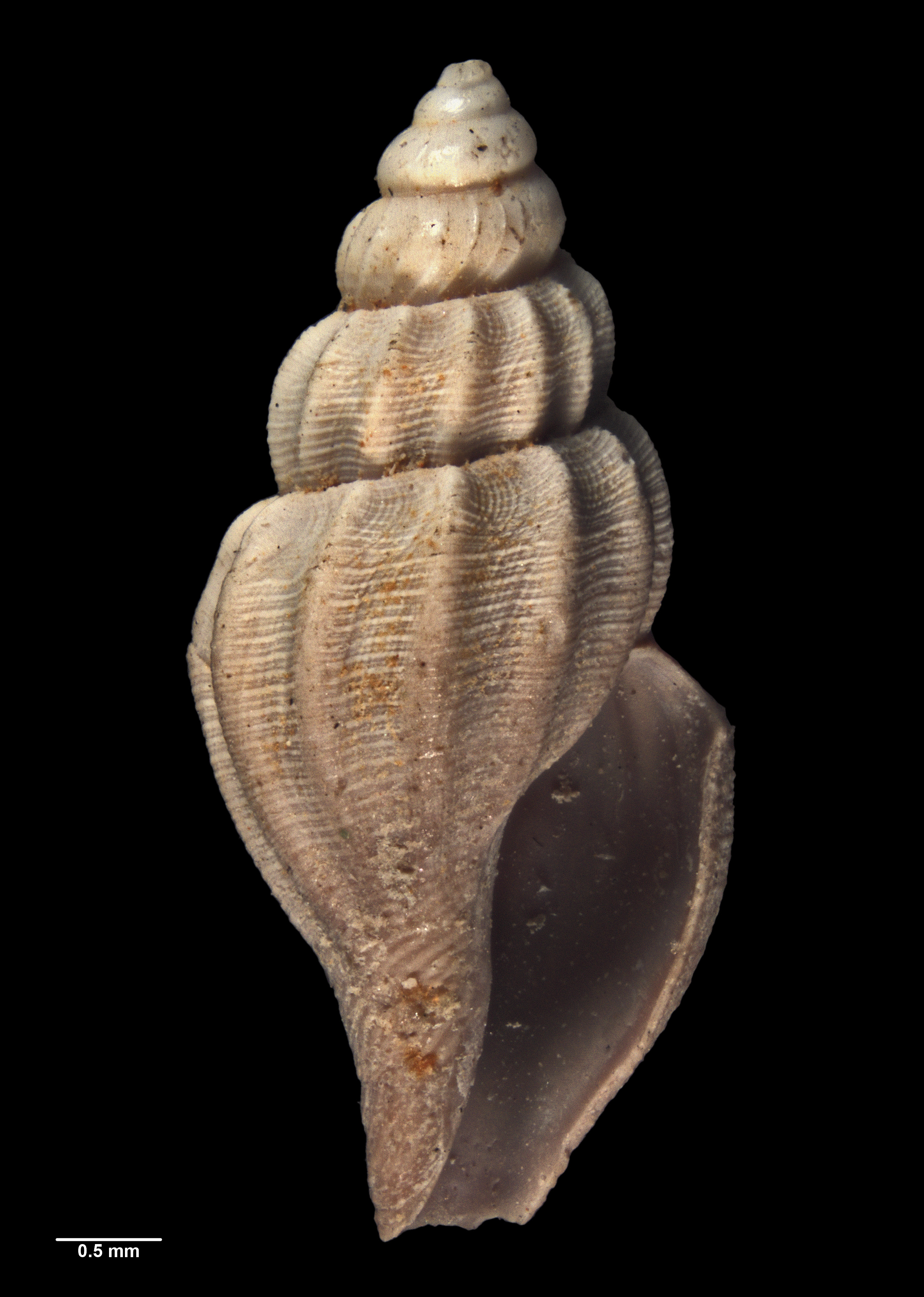
- Holotype from Auckland War Memorial Museum

Scientific classification
- Kingdom: Animalia
- Phylum: Mollusca
- Class: Gastropoda
- Subclass: Caenogastropoda
- Order: Neogastropoda
- Family: Mangeliidae
- Genus: Guraleus
- Species: †G. janjukiensis

Binomial name
- †Guraleus janjukiensis A. W. B. Powell, 1944

= Guraleus janjukiensis =

Guraleus janjukiensis Temporal range: early Miocene

Extinct species of gastropod

Guraleus janjukiensis is an extinct species of sea snail, a marine gastropod mollusc, in the family Mangeliidae. Fossils of the species date to early Miocene strata of the Port Phillip Basin of Victoria, Australia.

== Description ==
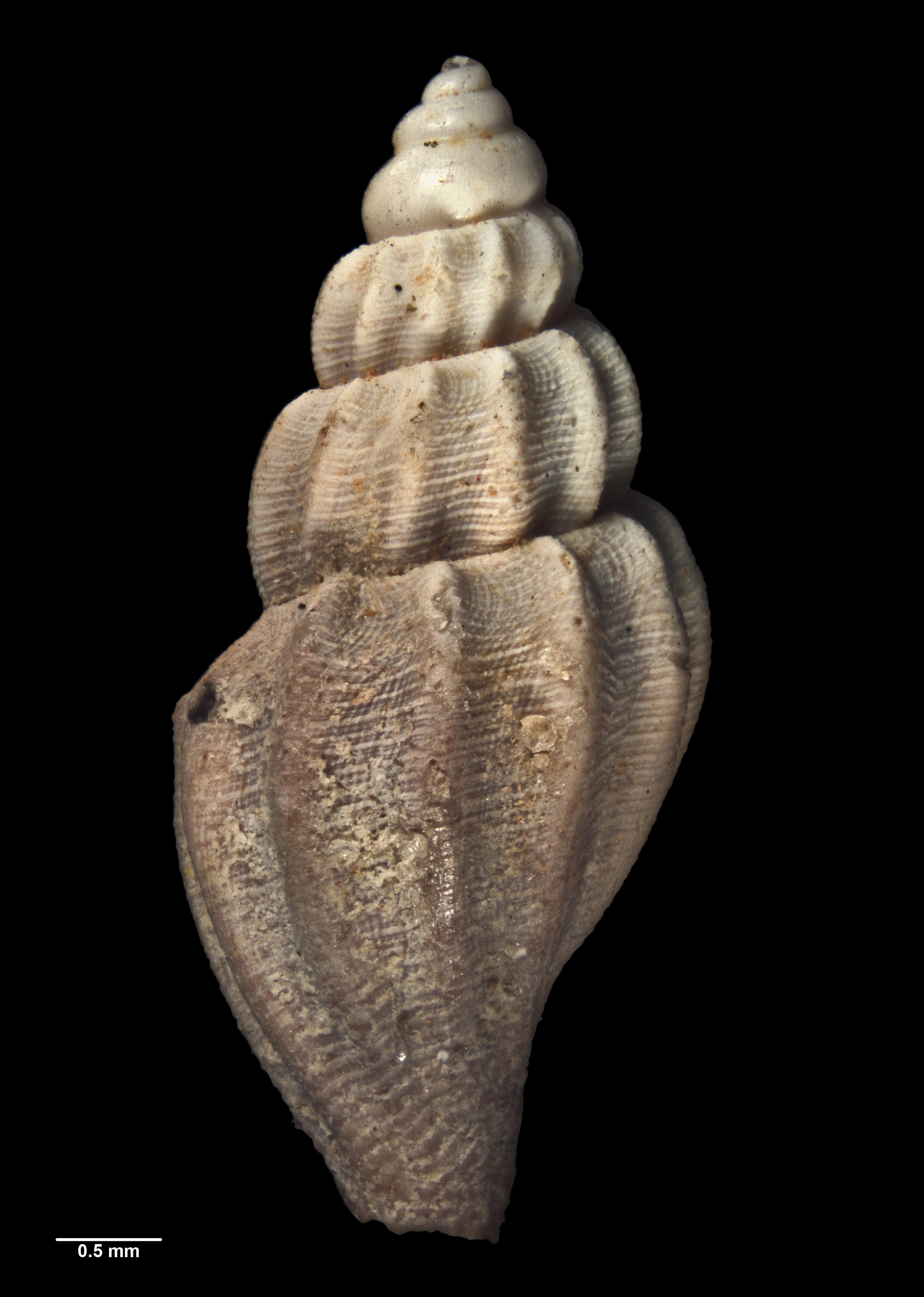
Reverse view of holotype

In the original description, Powell described the species as follows:

Ovate-fusiform; whorls strongly convex, not shouldered. Sculptured with heavy rounded axials, 12 per whorl; extending from upper suture completely over base. The sinus area, extending a little more than one third down from the upper suture on the spire-whorls, is delicately sculptured with about 10 very faint threads crossed by equally fine axial hair threads following the shallow concavity of the sinus. Below the sinus area to the lower suture there are 10 narrow crisp threads, and about 30 on the body-whorl. Protoconch polygyrate, conic, of 3 1/2 smooth whorls with minute exserted tip, followed by a half whorl of fine arcuate brephic axials.

The holotype of the species measures 5.75 mm (0.226 in) in length and has a diameter of 2.7 mm (0.11 in).

== Taxonomy ==
The species was first described by A. W. B. Powell in 1944. The holotype was collected at an unknown date prior to 1945 from Torquay, Victoria, and is held in the collections of Auckland War Memorial Museum.

== Distribution ==
This extinct marine species occurs in early Miocene strata of the Port Phillip Basin of Victoria, Australia, including the Puebla Formation.
