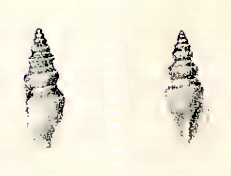
- Original image of a shell of Marita inornata

Scientific classification
- Kingdom: Animalia
- Phylum: Mollusca
- Class: Gastropoda
- Subclass: Caenogastropoda
- Order: Neogastropoda
- Superfamily: Conoidea
- Family: Mangeliidae
- Genus: Marita
- Species: M. inornata

Binomial name
- Marita inornata (G. B. Sowerby III, 1896)

Synonyms
- Daphnella inornata (G.B. Sowerby III, 1897); Guraleus (Guraleus) inornatus (G. B. Sowerby III, 1896); Mangilia inornata G. B. Sowerby III, 1896 (original combination)

= Marita inornata =

Species of gastropod

Marita inornata is a species of sea snail, a marine gastropod mollusk in the family Mangeliidae.

== Description ==
The length of the shell attains 8.5 mm, its diameter 3 mm.

The white shell has a fusiform shape. The acuminate spire has a sharp apex. It contains seven whorls, of which two in the protoconch. The subsequent whorls are angulated. They are crossed by very obscure lirae and faintly discernible ribs, becoming obsolete on the body whorl. The body whorl shows many inconspicuous lirae. The aperture is oblong. The columella is straight. The outer lip is sharp and slightly sinuate below.

== Distribution ==
This marine species is endemic to Australia and occurs off South Australia.
