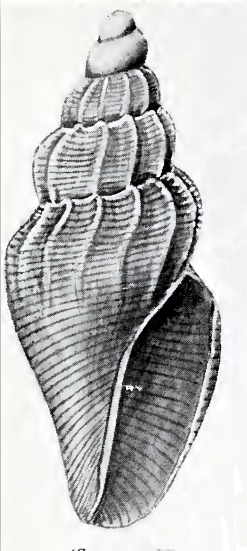
- Original image of a shell of Marita schoutenensis

Scientific classification
- Kingdom: Animalia
- Phylum: Mollusca
- Class: Gastropoda
- Subclass: Caenogastropoda
- Order: Neogastropoda
- Superfamily: Conoidea
- Family: Mangeliidae
- Genus: Marita
- Species: M. schoutenensis

Binomial name
- Marita schoutenensis (May, 1901)

Synonyms
- Guraleus schoutenensis (May, 1901); Guraleus (Guraleus) schoutenensis May, 1901; Mangilia schoutenensis May, 1901 (original combination)

= Marita schoutenensis =

Species of gastropod

Marita schoutenensis is a species of sea snail, a marine gastropod mollusk in the family Mangeliidae.

== Description ==
The length of the shell attains 5.3 mm, its diameter 2.5 mm.

The solid, yellowish white shell has a subfusiform shape. It contains 5 rounded whorls, including a large protoconch of two rounded polished whorls. The other whorls are strongly ribbed by distant curved ribs, about 12 on the spire. On the body whorl they disappear above the middle. The whole shell is girt by numerous irregularly spaced impressed lines, which pass over the ribs. The aperture is elongate, oval, with no contraction for a siphonal canal. The outer lip is thin, curved, with a moderate sinus at the suture, which bends the ribs. The columella is straight.

== Distribution ==
This marine species is endemic to Australia and occurs off New South Wales, Tasmania and Victoria.
