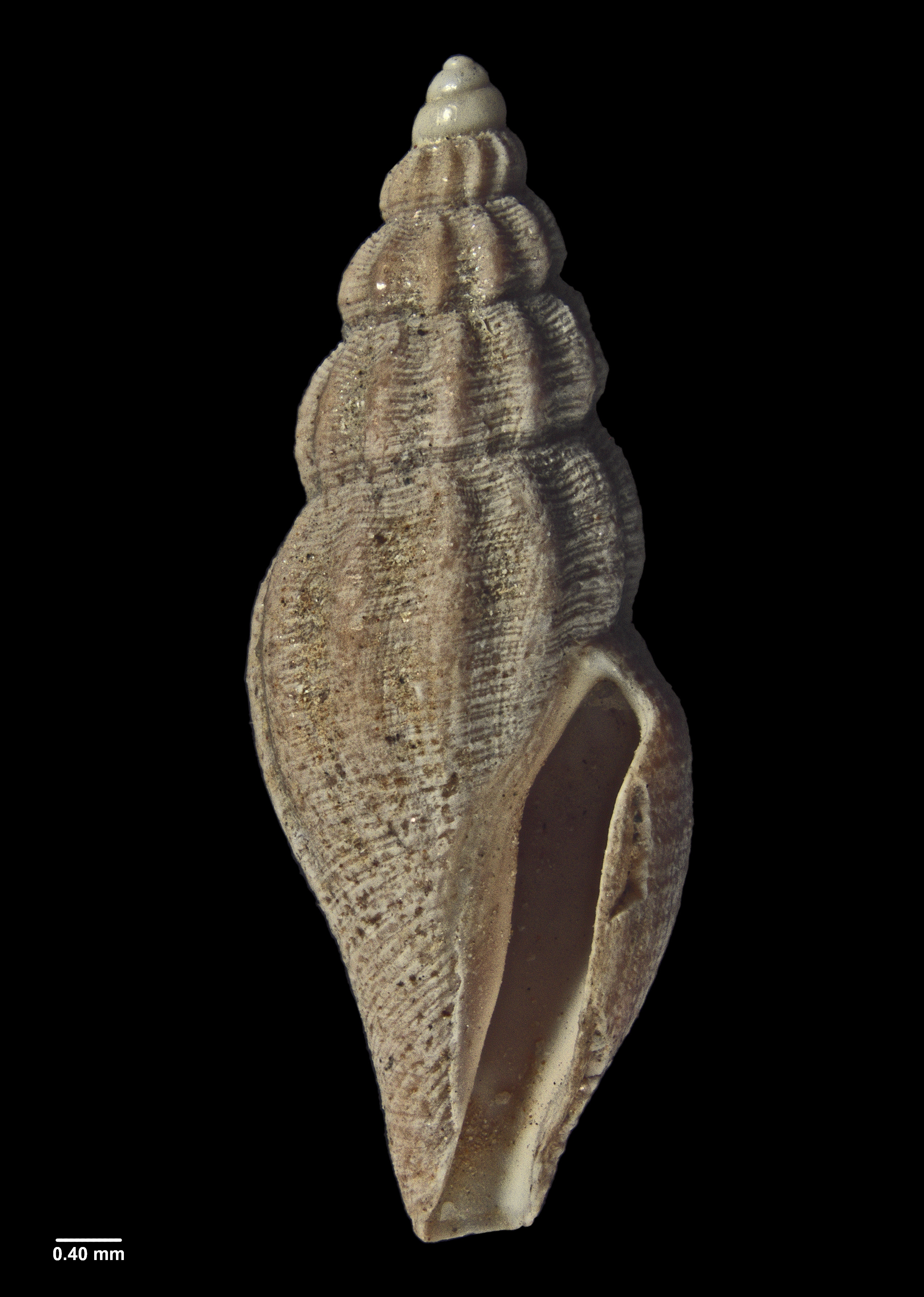
- Holotype from Auckland War Memorial Museum

Scientific classification
- Kingdom: Animalia
- Phylum: Mollusca
- Class: Gastropoda
- Subclass: Caenogastropoda
- Order: Neogastropoda
- Family: Mangeliidae
- Genus: Guraleus
- Species: †G. ludbrookae

Binomial name
- †Guraleus ludbrookae A. W. B. Powell, 1944

Synonyms
- Guraleus (Guraleus) ludbrookae A. W. B. Powell, 1944

= Guraleus ludbrookae =

Guraleus ludbrookae Temporal range: middle Miocene

Extinct species of gastropod

Guraleus ludbrookae is an extinct species of sea snail, a marine gastropod mollusc, in the family Mangeliidae. Fossils of the species date to middle Miocene strata of the St Vincent Basin of South Australia.

== Description ==
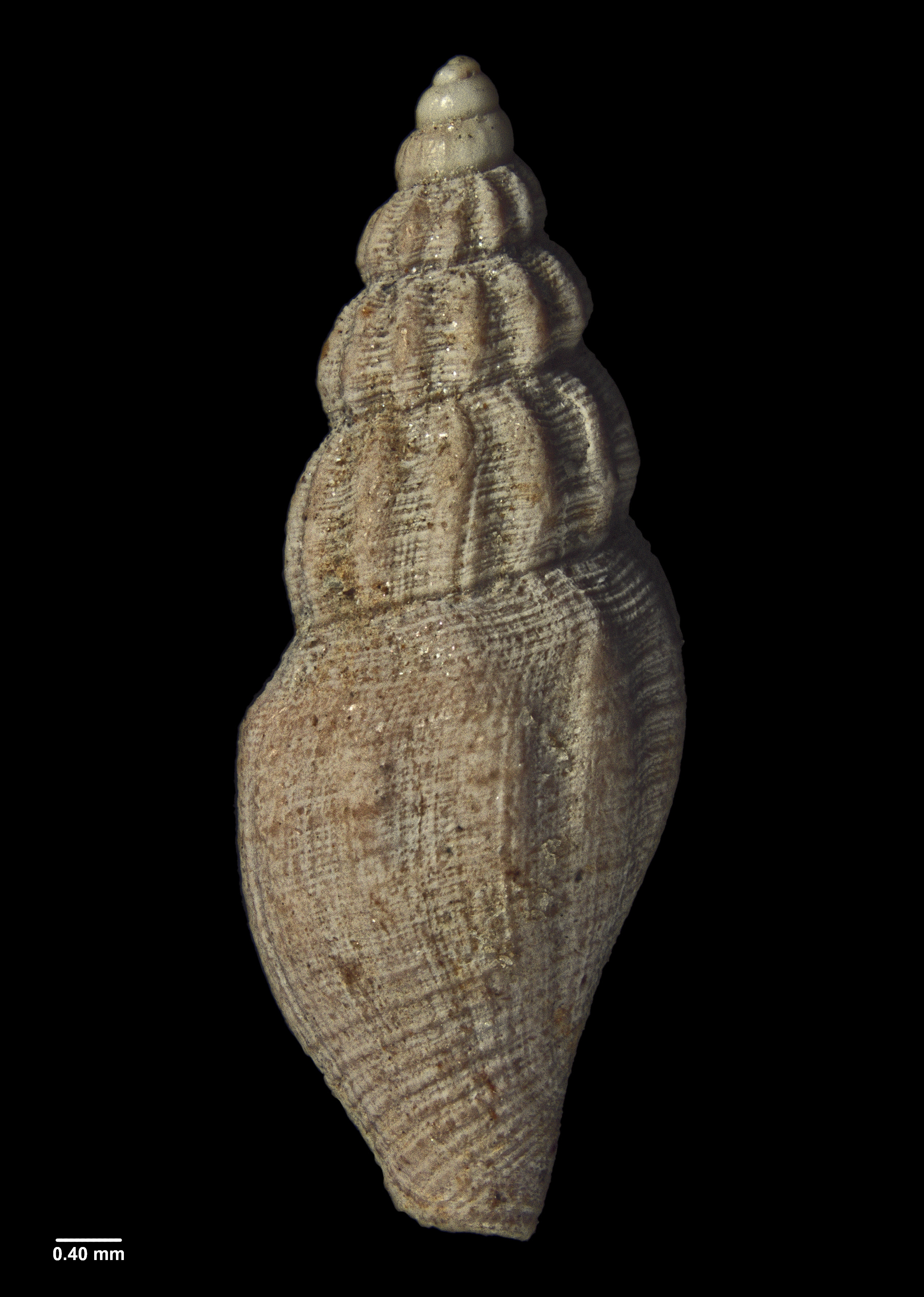
Reverse view of holotype

In the original description, Powell described the species as follows:

Ovate-fusiform, with rounded whorls. Sinus area defined only by a weakening of the axials and the presence of primary spirals below the middle of the whorls. Axials narrowly rounded, 12 per whorl, extending from upper suture completely over base. Sinus area with 5-7 fine threads. Four weak primaries on spire-whorls and about 14 on body-whorl. Interspaces with 1-2 threads. Anterior end with linear-spaced lirations. Sinus, aperture and protoconch all typical.

The holotype of the species measures 7.8 mm (0.31 in) in length and has a diameter of 3 mm (0.12 in).

== Taxonomy ==
The species was first described by A. W. B. Powell in 1944. The holotype was collected in 1919 by W. Howchin and J.C. Verco from the Metropolitan Abattoirs Bore in Adelaide, South Australia at a depth of between 122–152 m (400–499 ft). It is held in the collections of Auckland War Memorial Museum.

== Distribution ==
This extinct marine species occurs in middle Miocene strata of the St Vincent Basin of South Australia, including the Dry Creek Sands.
