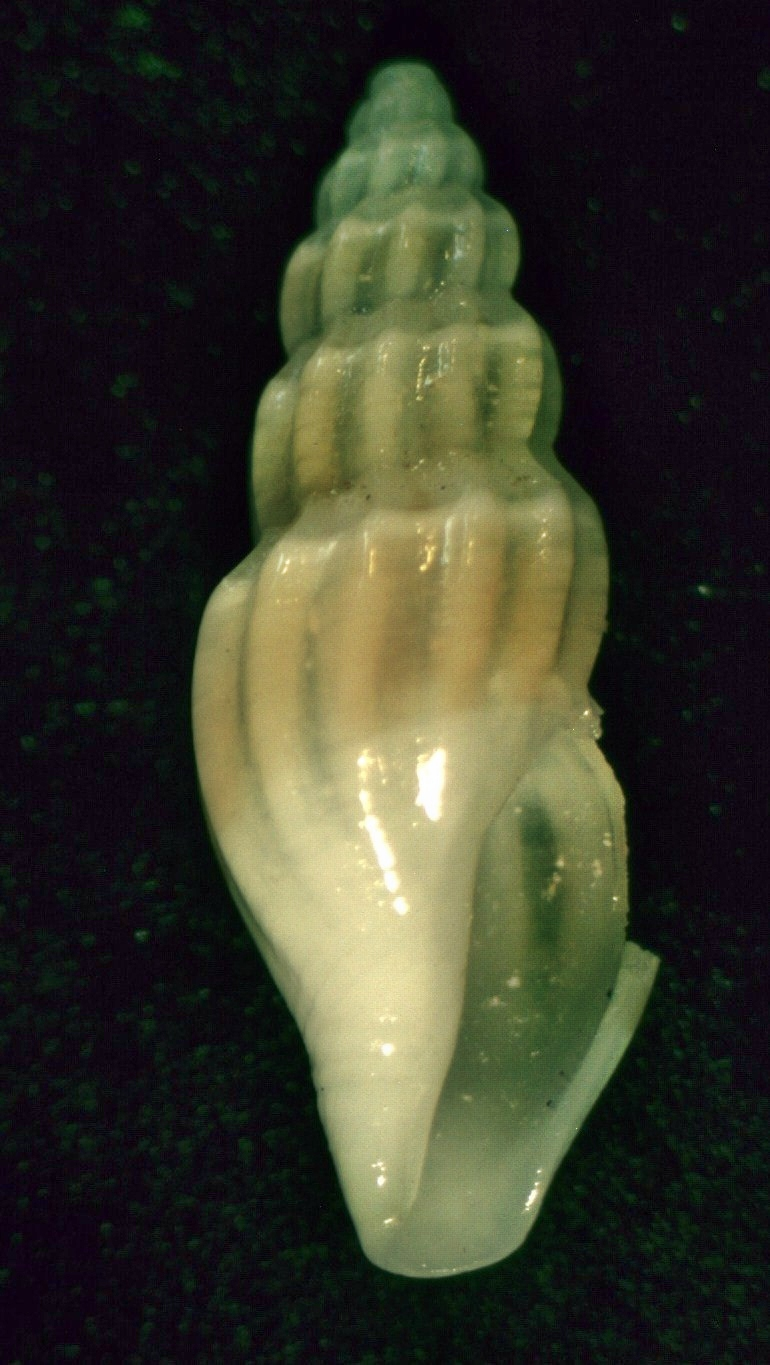
- Shell of Guraleus pictus

Scientific classification
- Kingdom: Animalia
- Phylum: Mollusca
- Class: Gastropoda
- Subclass: Caenogastropoda
- Order: Neogastropoda
- Superfamily: Conoidea
- Family: Mangeliidae
- Genus: Guraleus
- Species: G. pictus

Binomial name
- Guraleus pictus (Adams & Angas, 1864)

Synonyms
- Mangelia meredithiae Tenison-Woods, 1876; Mangelia picta Adams & Angas, 1864 (original combination); Pleurotoma (Mangelia) vincentina Crosse & P. Fischer, 1865 junior subjective synonym

= Guraleus pictus =

Species of gastropod

Guraleus pictus is a species of sea snail, a marine gastropod mollusk in the family Mangeliidae.

== Description ==
(Original description in Latin) The shell is turreted-fusiform, with a produced spire that is longer than the aperture. It is pale tawny, adorned with a broad, brownish-purplish band in the middle of the whorls, and equipped with an opaque white transverse posterior zone. The whorls are somewhat convex, longitudinally plicate, with distant, flexuous, rib-like folds, and closely grooved transversely. The aperture is elongated; the lip is simple; and the outer lip is varicose externally, smooth internally, with an acute and broadly sinuous posterior margin.

The Guraleus pictus has a typical shell length of 17mm, variable in size, shape and extent of brown banding.

== Distribution ==
This marine species is endemic to Southern Australia and Eastern Australia and can be found intertidally and subtidally amongst rocks and seaweed off the coasts of New South Wales, Queensland, South Australia, Victoria, Western Australia and Tasmania.
