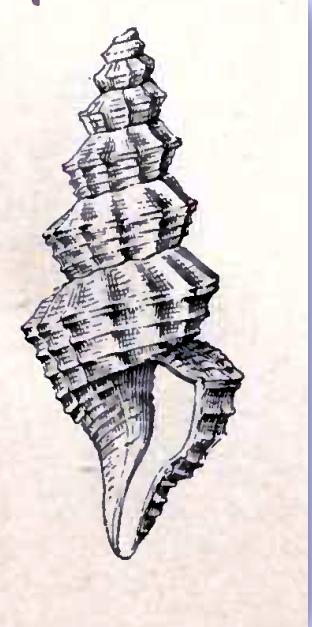
- Original image of a shell of Saccharoturris monocingulata

Scientific classification
- Kingdom: Animalia
- Phylum: Mollusca
- Class: Gastropoda
- Subclass: Caenogastropoda
- Order: Neogastropoda
- Superfamily: Conoidea
- Family: Mangeliidae
- Genus: Saccharoturris
- Species: S. monocingulata

Binomial name
- Saccharoturris monocingulata (Dall, 1889)

Synonyms
- Glyphoturris quadrata quadrata (var.) monocingulata (Dall, 1889); Mangelia monocingulata (Dall, 1889); Mangilia monocingulata Dall, 1889 (original combination); Mangilia quadrata var. monocingulata Dall, 1889

= Saccharoturris monocingulata =

Species of gastropod

Saccharoturris monocingulata is a species of sea snail, a marine gastropod mollusk in the family Mangeliidae.

== Description ==
The length of the shell attains 6.8 mm.

(Original description) This species differs from Glyphoturris diminuta by having one more rib (nine in all) and in having the basal cingulum obsolete, so that the prominence of the posterior nearly peripheral angulation though not enlarged is much more apparent. This is shown in the figure. Another specimen shows a further modification, in which the number of primary spirals is diminished, and the remaining ones are less prominent, thus making the whorls appear more rounded. Both of the specimens figured are not quite adult, and hence do not show the aperture fully formed.

== Distribution ==
This marine species occurs off Western Florida, USA; off Barbados and off Mexico; in the Antilles off Guadeloupe
