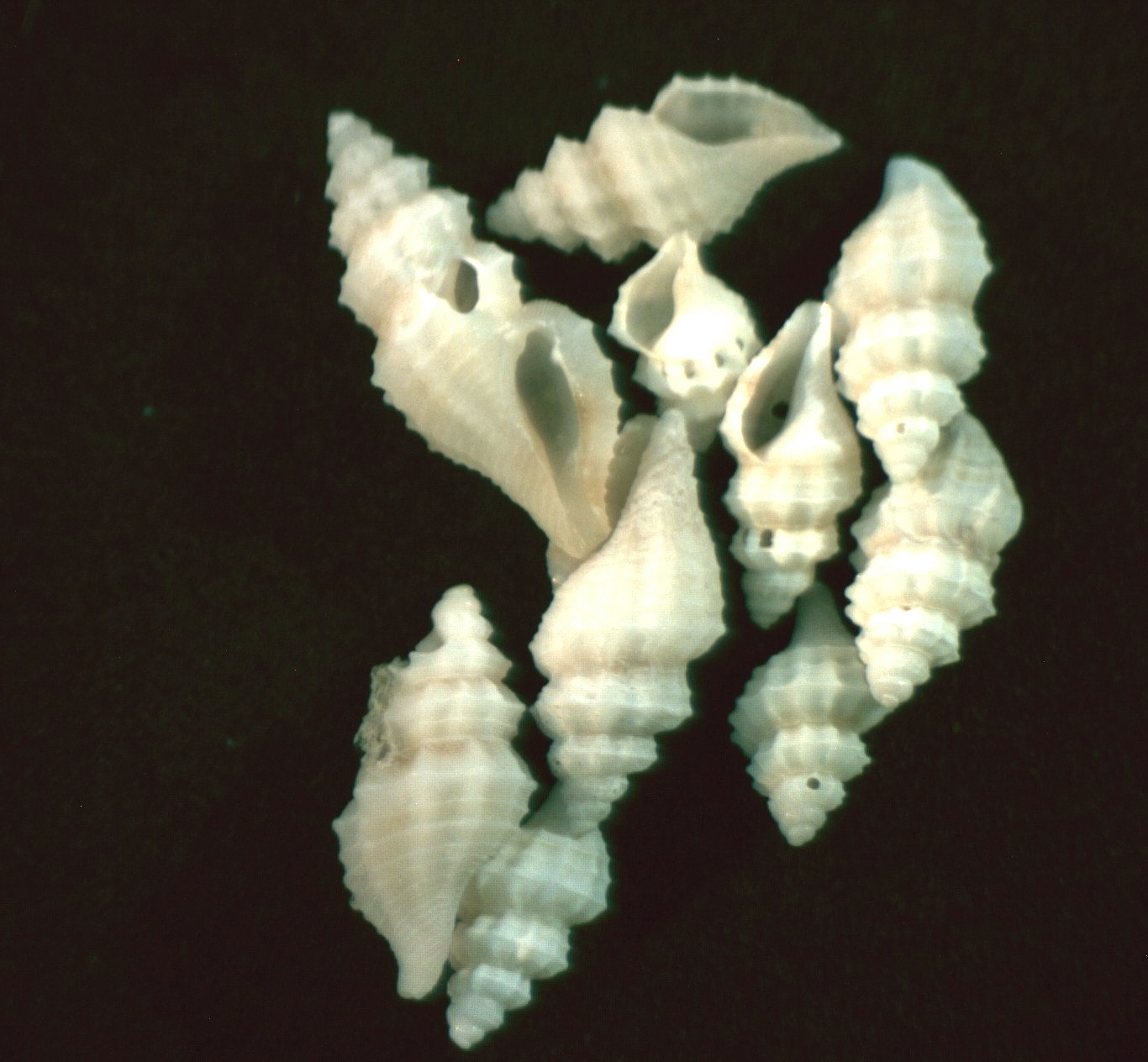
- Shells of Glyphoturris quadrata

Scientific classification
- Kingdom: Animalia
- Phylum: Mollusca
- Class: Gastropoda
- Subclass: Caenogastropoda
- Order: Neogastropoda
- Superfamily: Conoidea
- Family: Mangeliidae
- Genus: Glyphoturris; Woodring, 1928

Type species
- Mangilia rugirima Dall, 1889

Species
- See text

= Glyphoturris =

Genus of gastropods

Glyphoturris is a genus of sea snails, marine gastropod mollusks in the family Mangeliidae.

== Species ==
Species within the genus Glyphoturris include:

- Glyphoturris eritima (Bush, 1885)
- † Glyphoturris lampra Woodring 1928
- Glyphoturris quadrata (Reeve, 1845)
- Glyphoturris rugirima (Dall, 1889)

Species brought into synonymy

- Glyphoturris diminuta (Adams C. B., 1850): synonym of Glyphoturris quadrata (Reeve, 1845)
- Glyphoturris granilirata (Smith, E.A., 1888): synonym of Pseudorhaphitoma granilirata (E. A. Smith, 1888)
