= Pseudorhaphitoma epistomifer =

Scientific classification
- Kingdom: Animalia
- Phylum: Mollusca
- Class: Gastropoda
- Subclass: Caenogastropoda
- Order: Neogastropoda
- Superfamily: Conoidea
- Family: Mangeliidae
- Genus: Pseudorhaphitoma
- Species: P. epistomifer

Binomial name
- Pseudorhaphitoma epistomifer Kilburn, 1993

Species of gastropod

Pseudorhaphitoma epistomifer is a small sea snail, a marine gastropod mollusk in the family Mangeliidae.

== Description ==
The length of the shell varies between 3 mm and 4.2 mm.

== Distribution ==
This marine genus occurs off Northern Natal and Western Transkei, South Africa. The type locality is off Durban at coordinates 29°50.2'S, 31°12.3'E, at a depth of 95 m.

Additional records include localities off Tongaat Bluff at 150 m; Waterfall Bluff at 80–90 m; Mgazi River at 48 m and 92 m; and Qora River mouth at 100 m. All specimens from these sites consist of empty shells collected from various substrata. The species occurs primarily at depths of 50–150 m. A single record at 250 m may represent drift material rather than in situ occurrence. It is likely more widely distributed across the tropical Indian Ocean, potentially corresponding to Pseudorhaphitoma albula Thiele, 1925, from Sumatra, though confirmation requires direct comparison of material.

The species occurs primarily at depths of 50–150 m. A single record at 250 m may represent drift material rather than in situ occurrence.
