= Saccharoturris centrodes =

Scientific classification
- Kingdom: Animalia
- Phylum: Mollusca
- Class: Gastropoda
- Subclass: Caenogastropoda
- Order: Neogastropoda
- Superfamily: Conoidea
- Family: Mangeliidae
- Genus: Saccharoturris
- Species: S. centrodes

Binomial name
- Saccharoturris centrodes J. Gardner, 1947

Extinct species of gastropod

Saccharoturris centrodes is an extinct species of sea snail, a marine gastropod mollusk in the family Mangeliidae.

== Description ==
The length of the shell attains 4.8 mm, its diameter is 1.6 mm.

== Distribution ==
This extinct marine species was found in Miocene strata off the Chipola River, Calhoun County, Florida, USA.
