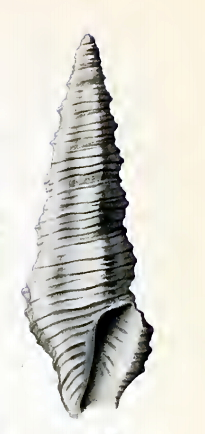
- Original image of a shell of Pseudorhaphitoma styracina

Scientific classification
- Kingdom: Animalia
- Phylum: Mollusca
- Class: Gastropoda
- Subclass: Caenogastropoda
- Order: Neogastropoda
- Superfamily: Conoidea
- Family: Mangeliidae
- Genus: Pseudorhaphitoma
- Species: P. styracina

Binomial name
- Pseudorhaphitoma styracina Hedley, 1922

= Pseudorhaphitoma styracina =

Species of gastropod

Pseudorhaphitoma styracina is a small sea snail, a marine gastropod mollusk in the family Mangeliidae.

== Description ==
The length of the shell attains 10 mm, its diameter 3 mm.

(Original description) The solid shell is subulate. It contains 10 whorls. Its colour is a uniform grey.

Sculpture: The ribs are low and broad, with narrow interstices, six on the body whorl. The spirals are sharp threads running evenly over both ribs and furrows, and increasing by intercalation. On the penultimate whorl are four spirals, and on the body whorl fourteen, some of which are alternately large and small.

The aperture:—The sinus is U-shaped, rather wide and deep. The columella is simple. The outer lip has a thin bent edge; throat grooved within.

== Distribution ==
This marine genus occurs in the Gulf of Carpentaria and off Queensland, Australia
