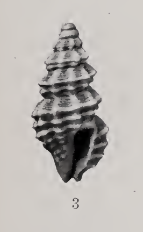
- Shell (U.S. Nat. Mus. No. 369392)

Scientific classification
- Kingdom: Animalia
- Phylum: Mollusca
- Class: Gastropoda
- Subclass: Caenogastropoda
- Order: Neogastropoda
- Superfamily: Conoidea
- Family: Mangeliidae
- Genus: Glyphoturris
- Species: G. lampra

Binomial name
- Glyphoturris lampra (Woodring, 1928)

= Glyphoturris lampra =

Extinct species of gastropod

Glyphoturris lampra is an extinct species of sea snail, a marine gastropod mollusc in the family Mangeliidae.

== Description ==
The length of the shell attains 5.3 mm, its diameter 2.5 mm. The overall shape of the shell and the opening (aperture) are the same as what is typical for this genus. The nucleus (the earliest part of the shell formed when the animal was young) has almost four whorls that increase in size quickly. The last two whorls have small vertical ribs (axial riblets) and are slightly swollen around the outer edge. The surface pattern (sculpture) of the shell includes tall vertical ribs, with about 9 ribs on the second-to-last whorl. Crossing these ribs are three strong spiral ridges (spiral cords) on that same whorl.

== Distribution ==
Fossils of this species have been found in Pliocene strata of the Bowden Formation, Jamaica.
