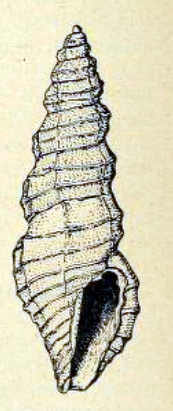
- Original image of a shell of Pseudorhaphitoma iodolabiata

Scientific classification
- Domain: Eukaryota
- Kingdom: Animalia
- Phylum: Mollusca
- Class: Gastropoda
- Subclass: Caenogastropoda
- Order: Neogastropoda
- Superfamily: Conoidea
- Family: Mangeliidae
- Genus: Pseudorhaphitoma
- Species: P. iodolabiata

Binomial name
- Pseudorhaphitoma iodolabiata (Hornung & Mermod, 1929)

Synonyms
- Clathurella iodolabiata Hornung & Merrnod, 1928; Mangilia iodolabiata Hornung & Mermod, 1929 (original combination)

= Pseudorhaphitoma iodolabiata =

Species of gastropod

Pseudorhaphitoma iodolabiata is a small sea snail, a marine gastropod mollusk in the family Mangeliidae.

== Description ==
The length of the shell attains 7.5 mm, its diameter 2.75 mm.

This small, yellowish shell is turriculated. The shell contains 16 whorls, including three whorls in the conical protoconch. The apex is sharp and vitreous. The third whorl shows oblique axial ribs. Strong axial ribs, not alternating from one whorl to the next, extend to the body whorl, where they attenuate. These axial ribs do not become arcuate below the suture. Each whorl becomes angular by strong, spiral lirae (12 on the body whorl), very distinct on the sides. The interstices show extremely fine and regular spicules. The suture runs straight and is not very distinct, giving the whorls a subulate aspect. The aperture is narrowly oval with a bright porcellaneous aspect. The siphonal canal is short, truncate and slightly askew. The outer lip is sharp and is strongly thickened by the last axial rib. On its inside it is denticulate with three or four obsolete teeth and a parietal tooth next to the sinus. The large sinus is rounded and lacks a varix. The columella is straight and slightly thickened on its sides.

== Distribution ==
This marine species occurs in the Red Sea and as an introduced species in the Mediterranean Sea off Israel
