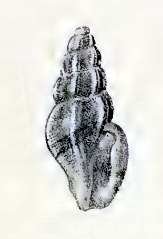
- Original image of a shell of Pseudorhaphitoma alfredi

Scientific classification
- Domain: Eukaryota
- Kingdom: Animalia
- Phylum: Mollusca
- Class: Gastropoda
- Subclass: Caenogastropoda
- Order: Neogastropoda
- Superfamily: Conoidea
- Family: Mangeliidae
- Genus: Pseudorhaphitoma
- Species: P. alfredi

Binomial name
- Pseudorhaphitoma alfredi (E. A. Smith, 1904)

Synonyms
- Anacithara alfredi (E. A. Smith, 1904); Cythara alfredi (E. A. Smith, 1904); Daphnella (Mangilia) alfredi (E. A. Smith, 1904); Mangelia alfredi E. A. Smith, 1904 (original combination); Mangelia misera Thiele, 1925; Mangilia alfredi E.A. Smith (original combination); Mangilia costata coarctata Sowerby, G.B. III, 1897; Pseudoraphitoma alfredi (E. A. Smith, 1904)

= Pseudorhaphitoma alfredi =

Species of gastropod

Pseudorhaphitoma alfredi is a small sea snail, a marine gastropod mollusk in the family Mangeliidae.

== Description ==
The length of the shell varies between 5 mm and 7 mm.

(Original description) This South African species differs from Mangilia costata var. coarctata Sowerby, G.B. III, 1897 in form. The aperture is shorter and broader. The six or seven ribs are also more regularly continuous up the spire, and especially in the much stronger spiral striation. The striae are close-set, hair-like, continued on and between the costae, and are easily observable under a simple lens. The colour is somewhat variable. Some specimens are white with a broad band around the middle of the body whorl. Others are light brownish, and with or without a darker peripheral zone.

However, R.N. Kilburn considered the simple spiral threads and total lack of apertural denticles atypical for this genus and thought that this species should belong in Mangelia (s.l.) in a small complex of temperate water South African species.

== Distribution ==
This marine genus occurs off Port Alfred, South Africa, and Mozambique.
