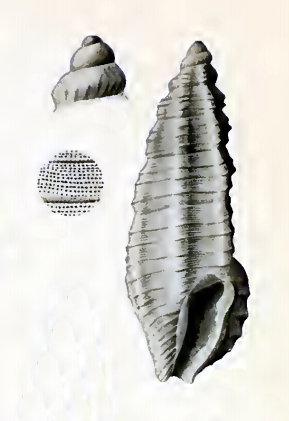
- Original image of a shell with protoconch and sculpture of Pseudorhaphitoma fairbanki

Scientific classification
- Kingdom: Animalia
- Phylum: Mollusca
- Class: Gastropoda
- Subclass: Caenogastropoda
- Order: Neogastropoda
- Superfamily: Conoidea
- Family: Mangeliidae
- Genus: Pseudorhaphitoma
- Species: P. fairbanki

Binomial name
- Pseudorhaphitoma fairbanki (G. Nevill & H. Nevill, 1875)

Synonyms
- Mangelia fairbanki G. Nevill & H. Nevill, 1875 (original combination); Pseudoraphitoma fairbanki [sic] (misspelling)

= Pseudorhaphitoma fairbanki =

Species of gastropod

Pseudorhaphitoma fairbanki is a small sea snail, a marine gastropod mollusk in the family Mangeliidae.

== Description ==
The length of the shell attains 6.2 mm, its diameter 2.3 mm.

(Redescription) The solid shell is narrowly conical. Its colour is uniform cinnamon-drab, except the first two whorls which are hyaline white. The shell contains 8 whorls, gradually increasing in size.

Sculpture:—-The second whorl has a nepionic sculpture of numerous fine radial riblets. The remainder of the shell is traversed by six prominent stout spaced radial ribs, which ascend the spire vertically and without interruption. These are crossed by fine and coarse spirals. The major spirals number ten on the body whorl, four on the penultimate whorl, and three on the previous whorls. They form polished beads on the crests of the ribs. Between each major spiral run six to eight microscopically beaded threads. Behind the aperture the suture first ascends slightly, then descends abruptly. The final rib, more massive than its fellows, forms a varix in which is excavated a semicircular sinus, and from which an inbent lip contracts the aperture. Within the outer lip are four denticules, and on the inner lip is a raised callus pad. The siphonal canal is short and broad.

== Distribution ==
This marine genus occurs off Western India.
