= Pseudorhaphitoma pyramidula =

Scientific classification
- Kingdom: Animalia
- Phylum: Mollusca
- Class: Gastropoda
- Subclass: Caenogastropoda
- Order: Neogastropoda
- Superfamily: Conoidea
- Family: Mangeliidae
- Genus: Pseudorhaphitoma
- Species: P. pyramidula

Binomial name
- Pseudorhaphitoma pyramidula (Laseron, 1954)

Synonyms
- Pseudoraphitoma pyramidula Laseron, 1954 (original combination)

Species of gastropod

Pseudorhaphitoma pyramidula is a small sea snail, a marine gastropod mollusk in the family Mangeliidae.

== Distribution ==
This marine species is endemic to Australia and occurs off the New South Wales
