= Pseudorhaphitoma venusta =

Scientific classification
- Kingdom: Animalia
- Phylum: Mollusca
- Class: Gastropoda
- Subclass: Caenogastropoda
- Order: Neogastropoda
- Superfamily: Conoidea
- Family: Mangeliidae
- Genus: Pseudorhaphitoma
- Species: P. venusta

Binomial name
- Pseudorhaphitoma venusta (Morassi, 1994)

Synonyms
- Pseudoraphitoma venusta Morassi, 1994 (original combination)

Species of gastropod

Pseudorhaphitoma venusta is a small sea snail, a marine gastropod mollusk in the family Mangeliidae.

== Distribution ==
This marine genus occurs off Somalia.
