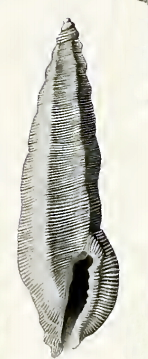
- Original image of a shell of Pseudorhaphitoma axicula

Scientific classification
- Kingdom: Animalia
- Phylum: Mollusca
- Class: Gastropoda
- Subclass: Caenogastropoda
- Order: Neogastropoda
- Superfamily: Conoidea
- Family: Mangeliidae
- Genus: Pseudorhaphitoma
- Species: P. axicula

Binomial name
- Pseudorhaphitoma axicula Hedley, 1922

Synonyms
- Mangelia hexagonalis Brazier, J., 1876

= Pseudorhaphitoma axicula =

Species of mollusc

Pseudorhaphitoma axicula is a small sea snail, a marine gastropod mollusk in the family Mangeliidae.

== Description ==
The length of the shell attains 8 mm, its diameter 2 mm.

(Original description) The solid, subcylindrical shell has a rounded bas, flat sides, and a delicately tapered summit. Its colour is pale buff, uniform but for a tinge of lilac on the columella. The shell contains nine whorls, including the protoconch.. The initial whorl of the protoconch is tilted, the first and second smooth and helicoid. The suture is lineai'.

Sculpture :—A clathrate sculpture is developed on the third whorl, the next is bicariuate. Later the keels diminish and vanish. There are six ribs to a whorl, elevated, stout, and distant, descending the spire perpendicularly and continuously. At the anterior extremity the ribs run across the aperture. The spirals are even closely packed threads, numbering about seventeen on the penultimate, and about forty on the body whorl. The aperture is very narrow, without denticules on either side. The varix is of the calibre of the preceding ribs. Its insertion does not rise above the plane of the sutui'e, and it fills the interval between two ribs of the preceding whorl. The sinus is small and shallow. The columella is perpendicular. The siphonal canal is short and broad.

== Distribution ==
This marine genus occurs off Taiwan and Queensland, Australia
