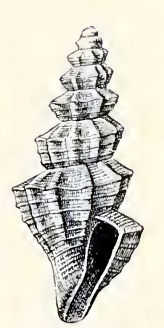
- Shell of † Saccharoturris consentanea

Scientific classification
- Kingdom: Animalia
- Phylum: Mollusca
- Class: Gastropoda
- Subclass: Caenogastropoda
- Order: Neogastropoda
- Superfamily: Conoidea
- Family: Mangeliidae
- Genus: Saccharoturris; Woodring, 1928

Species
- See text

= Saccharoturris =

Genus of gastropods

Saccharoturris is a genus of sea snails, marine gastropod mollusks in the family Mangeliidae.

== General characteristics ==
(original description) The shell is small and slender, and its whorls are very strongly constricted. The protoconch consists of three rapidly enlarging whorls, with the apex rising abruptly. The last two whorls are strongly keeled and bear beads on the keel, from which fine axial riblets extend. The aperture is wide, and the siphonal canal is short but strongly constricted and unemarginate. The outer lip is not varicose, and the anal notch is very shallow and broad. The sculpture consists of heavy varix-like ribs, which are overridden by strongly frosted spiral threads of several orders of magnitude.

== Species ==
Species within the genus Saccharoturris include:

- Saccharoturris bicingulata Fallon & Bouchet, 2026
- † Saccharoturris centrodes J. Gardner, 1937
- † Saccharoturris consentanea (R.J.L. Guppy, 1896)
- Saccharoturris major Fallon & Bouchet, 2026
- Saccharoturris monocingulata (Dall, 1889)
