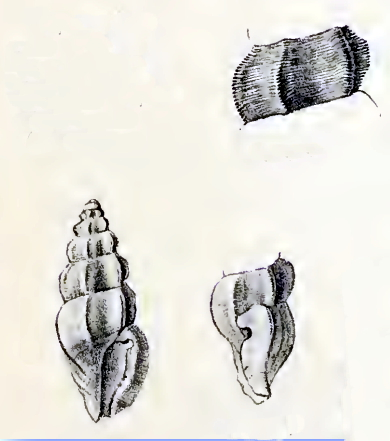
- Original image of a shell of Pseudorhaphitoma ichthys with abapertural view and close-up of sculpture.

Scientific classification
- Kingdom: Animalia
- Phylum: Mollusca
- Class: Gastropoda
- Subclass: Caenogastropoda
- Order: Neogastropoda
- Superfamily: Conoidea
- Family: Mangeliidae
- Genus: Pseudorhaphitoma
- Species: P. ichthys

Binomial name
- Pseudorhaphitoma ichthys (Melvill, 1910)

Synonyms
- Cythara deliciosa Barnard, 1958; Eucithera [sic] deliciosa Giles & Gosliner, 1983; Mangelia (Paraclathurella) maria Thiele, 1925; Mangilia ichthys Melvill, 1910 (original combination)

= Pseudorhaphitoma ichthys =

Species of gastropod

Pseudorhaphitoma ichthys is a small sea snail, a marine gastropod mollusk in the family Mangeliidae.

== Description ==
The length of the shell varies between 4.5 mm and 9 mm.

The small, delicate, fusiform shell has a light or pinkish brown color. It contains 7 whorls, of which two bulbous whorls in the protoconch. The third whorl is slightly crenulate. The other whorls show six ribs, continuous with each other and broadened. They are impressed at the shallow suture. The aperture is oblong. The outer lip is very wide. The sinus is broad, short and shallow and not extending far towards the margin of the outer lip. The columella is straight and is not produced at its base. The narrow siphonal canal is short and rather straight.

== Distribution ==
This marine species occurs in the Persian Gulf, off South Africa and off Taiwan.
