= Pseudorhaphitoma fortistriata =

Scientific classification
- Domain: Eukaryota
- Kingdom: Animalia
- Phylum: Mollusca
- Class: Gastropoda
- Subclass: Caenogastropoda
- Order: Neogastropoda
- Superfamily: Conoidea
- Family: Mangeliidae
- Genus: Pseudorhaphitoma
- Species: P. fortistriata

Binomial name
- Pseudorhaphitoma fortistriata (E. A. Smith, 1888)

Synonyms
- Mangilia fortistriata Melvill. 1917; Pleurotoma (Mangilia) fortistriata E. A. Smith, 1888 (original combination)

Species of gastropod

Pseudorhaphitoma fortistriata is a small sea snail, a marine gastropod mollusk in the family Mangeliidae.

== Description ==
The length of the shell attains 6.5 mm, its diameter 2.5 mm.

The white, strong solid shell has an oval shape. It contains 7 whorls, of which two polished whorls in the protoconch. The other whorls are convex and show seven stout rounded ribs continuous up the spire and extending to the base of the body whorl. The ribs are crossed by strong, spiral lirations. The small aperture measures 5/13 of the total length of the shell. The outer lip is strongly incrassate with 4-5 teeth. The siphonal canal is narrow and short.

== Distribution ==
This marine genus occurs off Mumbai, India.
