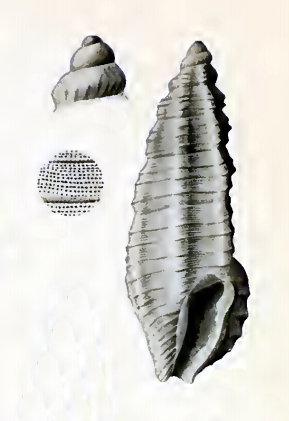
- Shell, protoconch and sculpture of Pseudorhaphitoma fairbanki

Scientific classification
- Kingdom: Animalia
- Phylum: Mollusca
- Class: Gastropoda
- Subclass: Caenogastropoda
- Order: Neogastropoda
- Superfamily: Conoidea
- Family: Mangeliidae
- Genus: Pseudorhaphitoma; Boettger, 1895

Type species
- Mangelia fairbanki G. Nevill & H. Nevill, 1875

Species
- See text

Synonyms
- Pseudoraphitoma (Incorrect spelling); Turrella Laseron, 1954

= Pseudorhaphitoma =

Genus of gastropods

Pseudorhaphitoma is a genus of sea snails, marine gastropod mollusks in the family Mangeliidae.

== Description ==
This genus was originally described by Boettger as a section in the genus Clathurella.

The small, thick, monochrome brown or white, elongate shells are claviform. They contain 6 - 7 whorls. The prominent and continuous axial ribs are moderately strong. They are crossed regularly by numerous, fine spiral lirae, producing granular or transverse plicules. The aperture measures about a third of the total length. The weakly notched siphonal canal is narrow and shallow. The sharp outer lip is denticulate on the inside and usually shows a particularly strong tooth close to the well-cut anal sinus. The columella occasionally carries 1-2 denticles.

== Species ==
Species within the genus Pseudorhaphitoma include:

- Pseudorhaphitoma agna (Melvill & Standen, 1896)
- Pseudorhaphitoma albula (Thiele, 1925)
- Pseudorhaphitoma alfredi (E. A. Smith, 1904)
- Pseudorhaphitoma alma (Thiele, 1925)
- Pseudorhaphitoma alticostata (G.B. Sowerby III, 1896)
- Pseudorhaphitoma averina (Melvill & Standen, 1901)
- Pseudorhaphitoma axicula Hedley, 1922
- Pseudorhaphitoma bipyramidata Hedley, 1922
- Pseudorhaphitoma brionae (Sowerby III, 1888)
- Pseudorhaphitoma calcata (Hedley, 1909)
- Pseudorhaphitoma chocolata Stahlschmidt & E. Tardy, 2018
- Pseudorhaphitoma cognata (Thiele, 1925)
- Pseudorhaphitoma confortinii Bozzetti, 2007
- Pseudorhaphitoma crudelis Hedley, 1922
- Pseudorhaphitoma darnleyi (Brazier, 1876)
- Pseudorhaphitoma ditylota (Melvill, 1912)
- Pseudorhaphitoma drivasi Kilburn, 1993
- Pseudorhaphitoma epistomifer Kilburn, 1993
- Pseudorhaphitoma ethekwini Kilburn, 1993
- Pseudorhaphitoma fairbanki (G. Nevill & H. Nevill, 1875)
- Pseudorhaphitoma fortistriata (Smith E. A., 1888)
- Pseudorhaphitoma fuscescens (Thiele, 1925)
- Pseudorhaphitoma granilirata (Smith E. A., 1888)
- Pseudorhaphitoma heptagona (Dunker, 1871)
- Pseudorhaphitoma hervieri (Hedley, 1922)
- Pseudorhaphitoma hexagonalis (Reeve, 1845)
- Pseudorhaphitoma ichthys (Melvill, 1910)
- Pseudorhaphitoma informis Hedley, 1922
- Pseudorhaphitoma iodolabiata (Hornung & Mermod, 1929)
- Pseudorhaphitoma jamesnacei Stahlschmidt & E. Tardy, 2018
- Pseudorhaphitoma jeantardyi Stahlschmidt & E. Tardy, 2018
- Pseudorhaphitoma kilburni Morassi & Bonfitto, 2001
- Pseudorhaphitoma mamillata (Smith E. A., 1888)
- Pseudorhaphitoma multigranosa (Schepman, 1913)
- Pseudorhaphitoma naganumaensis Otuka, 1935
- † Pseudoraphitoma nakosiensis Nomura & Zinbo, 1936
- Pseudorhaphitoma obturata Kilburn, 1993
- Pseudorhaphitoma ornata Stahlschmidt & E. Tardy, 2018
- Pseudorhaphitoma paula (Thiele, 1925)
- Pseudorhaphitoma perlonga (Melvill, 1899)
- Pseudorhaphitoma perplexior Kilburn & Dekker, 2008
- Pseudorhaphitoma phaea (Melvill & Standen, 1901)
- Pseudorhaphitoma poppei Stahlschmidt & E. Tardy, 2018
- Pseudorhaphitoma pyramidalis (Reeve, 1846)
- Pseudorhaphitoma pyramidula (Laseron, 1954)
- Pseudorhaphitoma pyramis (Hinds, 1843)
- Pseudorhaphitoma scitula (Smith E. A., 1884)
- Pseudorhaphitoma severa (Thiele, 1925)
- Pseudorhaphitoma sienna Kilburn, 1993
- Pseudorhaphitoma stipendiarii Kilburn, 1993
- Pseudorhaphitoma styracina Hedley, 1922
- Pseudorhaphitoma tetragona (Gould, 1861)
- Pseudorhaphitoma thielei Kilburn, 1993
- Pseudorhaphitoma transitans Hedley, 1922
- Pseudorhaphitoma tropica (Thiele, 1925)
- Pseudorhaphitoma uncicostata Kilburn & Dekker, 2008
- Pseudorhaphitoma venusta (Morassi, 1994)

Species brought into synonymy

- Pseudorhaphitoma anna Thiele, J., 1925: synonym of Pseudorhaphitoma thielei Kilburn, 1993
- Pseudorhaphitoma castellata (Smith E. A., 1888): synonym of Agathotoma castellata (E.A. Smith, 1888)
- Pseudorhaphitoma costata coarctata G.B. Sowerby, 1897: synonym of Pseudorhaphitoma alfredi (E.A. Smith, 1904)
- Pseudorhaphitoma misera K.H.J. Thiele, 1925: synonym of Pseudorhaphitoma alfredi (E.A. Smith, 1904)
- Pseudorhaphitoma maria K.H.J. Thiele, 1925: synonym of Pseudorhaphitoma ichthys (J.C. Melvill, 1910)
- Pseudorhaphitoma obeliscus L.A. Reeve, 1846: synonym of Pseudorhaphitoma pyramis (R.B. Hinds, 1843)
