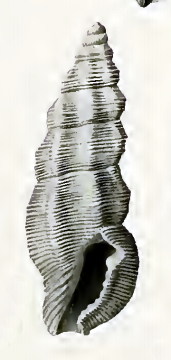
- Original image of a shell of Pseudorhaphitoma crudelis

Scientific classification
- Kingdom: Animalia
- Phylum: Mollusca
- Class: Gastropoda
- Subclass: Caenogastropoda
- Order: Neogastropoda
- Superfamily: Conoidea
- Family: Mangeliidae
- Genus: Pseudorhaphitoma
- Species: P. crudelis

Binomial name
- Pseudorhaphitoma crudelis Hedley, 1922

= Pseudorhaphitoma crudelis =

Species of gastropod

Pseudorhaphitoma crudelis is a small sea snail, a marine gastropod mollusk in the family Mangeliidae.

Pseudorhaphitoma granilirata Smith, E.A., 1888 is classified by Tucker as a synonym.

== Description ==
The length of the shell attains 5.5 mm, its diameter 2 mm.

(Original description) The small, rather solid shell is lanceolate, constricted at the suture, and contracted at the base. Its colour is a uniform pale buff. The shell contains 8 whorls, of which three constitute the protoconch.

Sculpture:—The ribs are seven to a whorl, slightly oblique to the axis, low and round-backed, decreasing in prominence as growth proceeds, continuing from whorl to whorl. The spirals are numerous, closely packed, grained, unequal threads extending from the suture 'to the base. On the upper whorl two spirals predominate to form a double keel, but these gradually decrease, so that when the body whorl is reached the discrepancy between major and minor spirals has nearly disappeared.

The aperture is narrow, the varix equal to the preceding ribs, and not rising above the plane of the suture. Its outer limb is evenly striated. Within the aperture a tubercle arises beneath the sinus. Below that and under the free edge of the limb are four minute denticules. The columella is perpendicular. The sinus is small and shallow. The siphonal canal is short and open

== Distribution ==
This marine genus occurs off South Africa, Papua New Guinea and Queensland, Australia
