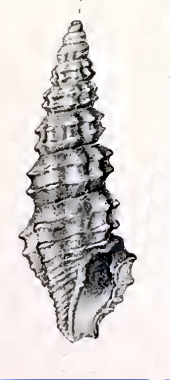
- Original image of a shell of Pseudorhaphitoma ditylota

Scientific classification
- Kingdom: Animalia
- Phylum: Mollusca
- Class: Gastropoda
- Subclass: Caenogastropoda
- Order: Neogastropoda
- Superfamily: Conoidea
- Family: Mangeliidae
- Genus: Pseudorhaphitoma
- Species: P. ditylota

Binomial name
- Pseudorhaphitoma ditylota (Melvill, 1912)

Synonyms
- Clathurella ditylota Melvill, 1912 (original combination); Defrancia ditylota (Melvill, 1912).; Lienardia (Etrema) ditylota (Melvill, 1912).

= Pseudorhaphitoma ditylota =

Species of gastropod

Pseudorhaphitoma ditylota is a small sea snail, a marine gastropod mollusk in the family Mangeliidae.

== Description ==
The length of the shell attains 7 mm, its diameter 2 mm.

(Original description) The solid, fusiform shell has a whitish color or is flesh-colored. It contains 9 whorls, of which two globose and almost translucent whorls in the protoconch. The third and sometimes the fourth whorl show simple spiral carinae. The other whorls show thick longitudinal ribs and are spirally bicarinate, producing sharp transverse plicules. The body whorl is tricarinate and continues at the same time and uninterrupted up to its base with 8 - 10 spirally lirae. The aperture is ovate. The slightly expanded outer lip is incrassate. The sinus is rather wide. The columella shows two plications or two tubercles.

This species is remarkable by the absence of fine grained spirals and is by this an aberrant members of this genus.

== Distribution ==
This marine genus occurs in the Persian Gulf, in the Gulf of Carpentaria and off Queensland, Australia
