= Pseudorhaphitoma mamillata =

Scientific classification
- Kingdom: Animalia
- Phylum: Mollusca
- Class: Gastropoda
- Subclass: Caenogastropoda
- Order: Neogastropoda
- Superfamily: Conoidea
- Family: Mangeliidae
- Genus: Pseudorhaphitoma
- Species: P. mamillata

Binomial name
- Pseudorhaphitoma mamillata (E. A. Smith, 1888)

Synonyms
- Pleurotoma (Mangilia) mamillata E. A. Smith, 1888 (original combination)

Species of gastropod

Pseudorhaphitoma mamillata is a small sea snail, a marine gastropod mollusk which belongs to family Mangeliidae.

== Description ==
The length of the shell reaches to 5.3 mm, with a diameter of 2 mm.

The pinkish shell is characterized by a subovate shape, containing 5 whorls. This shell is very remarkable on account of the large size of its two, convex, papillose protoconch whorls. The others are convex and show 7–8, almost straight and strong ribs extending to the base of the body whorl. These are crossed overall by slight spiral striations, (eight in the body whorl). The aperture is oblong and measures almost one-half of the total length of the shell. The outer lip is strongly incrassate and slightly sinuate. The columella has a slight callus. The siphonal canal is short and narrow.

== Distribution ==
It is commonly found in localities of the tropical Indo-West Pacific.
