= Pseudorhaphitoma thielei =

Scientific classification
- Kingdom: Animalia
- Phylum: Mollusca
- Class: Gastropoda
- Subclass: Caenogastropoda
- Order: Neogastropoda
- Superfamily: Conoidea
- Family: Mangeliidae
- Genus: Pseudorhaphitoma
- Species: P. thielei

Binomial name
- Pseudorhaphitoma thielei Kilburn, 1993

Synonyms
- Pseudorhaphitoma anna Thiele, J., 1925

Species of gastropod

Pseudorhaphitoma thielei is a small sea snail, a marine gastropod mollusk in the family Mangeliidae.

== Description ==
The length of the shell varies between 5.5 mm and 7.5 mm.

== Distribution ==
This marine genus occurs off Zululand, South Africa, and Zanzibar.
