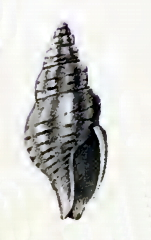
- Original image of a shell of Pseudorhaphitoma phaea

Scientific classification
- Kingdom: Animalia
- Phylum: Mollusca
- Class: Gastropoda
- Subclass: Caenogastropoda
- Order: Neogastropoda
- Superfamily: Conoidea
- Family: Mangeliidae
- Genus: Pseudorhaphitoma
- Species: P. phaea

Binomial name
- Pseudorhaphitoma phaea (Melvill & Standen, 1901)

Synonyms
- Mangilia phaea Melvill & Standen, 1901 (original combination)

= Pseudorhaphitoma phaea =

Species of gastropod

Pseudorhaphitoma phaea is a small sea snail, a marine gastropod mollusk in the family Mangeliidae.

== Description ==
A very small, ovate-fusiform, angled species, of a peculiar dark brown colour. It contains 7 whorls, of which two in the protoconch. The third whorl is very much angulate and longitudinally crenulate. The shell shows but few incrassate ribs (six in the body whorl), crossed by sparse lirae (about eighth in the body whorl), commencing at the centre of each whorl. The brownish aperture is narrow. The incrassate outer lip is slightly effuse. The sinus is wide and short. The purplish-red columella is straight.

The length of the shell attains 4 mm, its diameter 1 mm.

== Distribution ==
This marine genus occurs off Pakistan.
