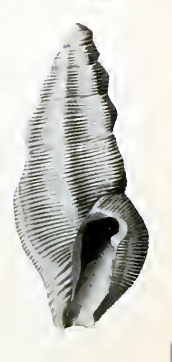
- Original image of a shell of Pseudorhaphitoma informis

Scientific classification
- Kingdom: Animalia
- Phylum: Mollusca
- Class: Gastropoda
- Subclass: Caenogastropoda
- Order: Neogastropoda
- Superfamily: Conoidea
- Family: Mangeliidae
- Genus: Pseudorhaphitoma
- Species: P. informis

Binomial name
- Pseudorhaphitoma informis Hedley, 1922

= Pseudorhaphitoma informis =

Species of gastropod

Pseudorhaphitoma informis is a small sea snail, a marine gastropod mollusk in the family Mangeliidae.

== Description ==
The length of the shell attains 5 mm, its diameter 2 mm.

(Original description) The small, rather solid shell has an ovate-elongate shape and is broader and shorter than usual. Its colour is a uniform pale buff externally, stained with orange inside the aperture. The shell contains 6 whorls.

Sculpture:—The ribs are six to a whorl, continuous, rather low, round-backed, and perpendicular. The spirals are fine, even, and close threads, which become coarser and more widely spaced on the aperture.

The aperture is rather wide. The varix is of the same calibre as the ribs. The sinus is small and shallow. Within the outer lip are four small denticules, the uppermost largest. The siphonal canal is short, broad, and re-curved.

== Distribution ==
This marine genus occurs in the Gulf of Carpentaria and off Queensland and New South Wales, Australia
