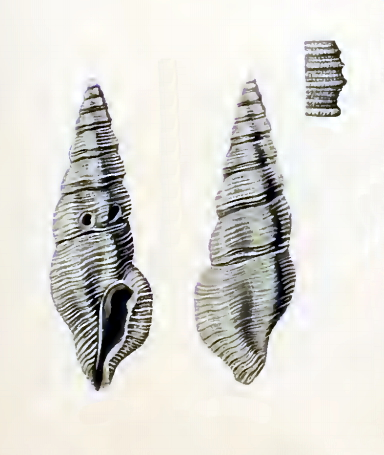
- Original image of a shell of Pseudorhaphitoma multigranosa

Scientific classification
- Kingdom: Animalia
- Phylum: Mollusca
- Class: Gastropoda
- Subclass: Caenogastropoda
- Order: Neogastropoda
- Superfamily: Conoidea
- Family: Mangeliidae
- Genus: Pseudorhaphitoma
- Species: P. multigranosa

Binomial name
- Pseudorhaphitoma multigranosa (Schepman, 1913)

Synonyms
- Mangilia multigranosa Schepman, 1913 (original combination)

= Pseudorhaphitoma multigranosa =

Species of gastropod

Pseudorhaphitoma multigranosa is a small sea snail, a marine gastropod mollusk in the family Mangeliidae.

== Description ==
The length of the shell attains 12 mm, its diameter 4 mm.

(Original description) The strong, yellowish-brown shell is elongately pyramidal, with a short siphonal canal. It contains 9 or 10 whorls, of which the uppermost is eroded, followed by about 2 closely ribbed ones. The subsequent whorls are slightly convex, with a deep suture, hexagonal by 6 continuous, rounded ribs. The sculpture consists of numerous spirals, of which the peripheral one and 2 or 3 lower ones are more prominent. At all there are on penultimate whorl of the largest specimen about 10 stronger spirals and 3 intermediate ones in each interstice, of these spirals. The median one is again stronger than the other ones (in the smaller specimen this arrangement is less conspicuous). Each of these spirals is closely covered with a row of granules, having the character of compressed squamae on the principal lirae. This sculpture extends also over the whole body whorl and the siphonal canal. The aperture is short, oval, rounded above, with a short, narrow siphonal canal below. The peristome is rather blunt, with a shallow sinus above and a strong rounded rib externally, 3 tooth-like tubercles in its interior, of which the uppermost is the largest. The columellar margin is nearly straight, but slightly concave above, directed to the left below, with a strong layer of enamel, only appressed above, free below, interiorly with a strong tubercle above and 2 flat plaits about its median part, each plait divided by a groove.

== Distribution ==
This marine species occurs ioff the Philippines and Indonesia
