= Pseudorhaphitoma drivasi =

Scientific classification
- Kingdom: Animalia
- Phylum: Mollusca
- Class: Gastropoda
- Subclass: Caenogastropoda
- Order: Neogastropoda
- Superfamily: Conoidea
- Family: Mangeliidae
- Genus: Pseudorhaphitoma
- Species: P. drivasi

Binomial name
- Pseudorhaphitoma drivasi Kilburn, 1993

Synonyms
- Mangelia heptagona Melvill, J.C., 1917

Species of gastropod

Pseudorhaphitoma drivasi is a small sea snail, a marine gastropod mollusk in the family Mangeliidae.

== Description ==
The length of the biconic-claviform shell varies between 2.3 mm and 8 mm.

== Distribution ==
This marine genus occurs in the Persian Gulf, off South Africa, and Réunion.
