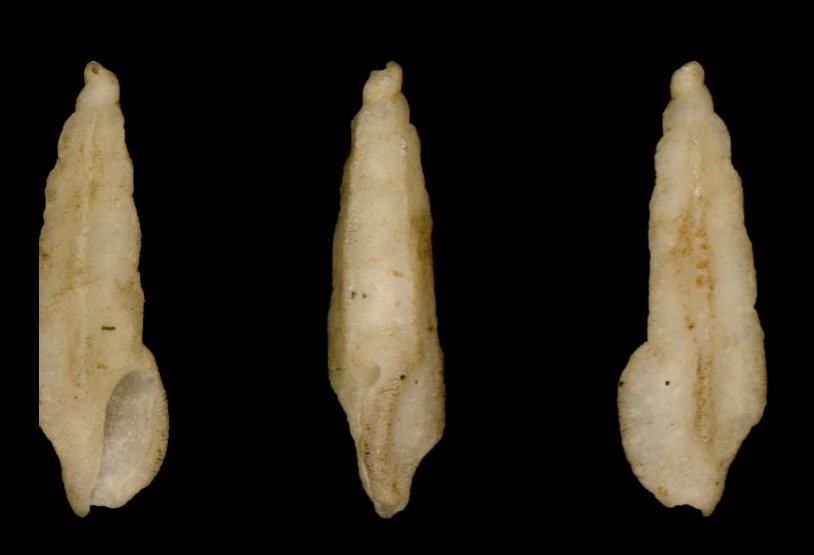
- Shell of Pseudorhaphitoma tetragona (lectotype at the Smithsonian Institution)

Scientific classification
- Kingdom: Animalia
- Phylum: Mollusca
- Class: Gastropoda
- Subclass: Caenogastropoda
- Order: Neogastropoda
- Superfamily: Conoidea
- Family: Mangeliidae
- Genus: Pseudorhaphitoma
- Species: P. tetragona

Binomial name
- Pseudorhaphitoma tetragona (Gould, 1861)

Synonyms
- Mangelia tetragona Gould, 1861 (original combination)

= Pseudorhaphitoma tetragona =

Species of gastropod

Pseudorhaphitoma tetragona is a small sea snail, a marine gastropod mollusk in the family Mangeliidae.

== Description ==
The length of the shell attains 5 mm.

== Distribution ==
This marine genus occurs in the South China Sea and the East China Sea.
