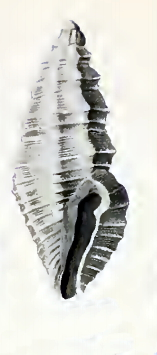
- Original image of a shell of Pseudorhaphitoma transitans

Scientific classification
- Kingdom: Animalia
- Phylum: Mollusca
- Class: Gastropoda
- Subclass: Caenogastropoda
- Order: Neogastropoda
- Superfamily: Conoidea
- Family: Mangeliidae
- Genus: Pseudorhaphitoma
- Species: P. transitans

Binomial name
- Pseudorhaphitoma transitans Hedley, 1922

= Pseudorhaphitoma transitans =

Species of gastropod

Pseudorhaphitoma transitans is a small sea snail, a marine gastropod mollusk in the family Mangeliidae.

== Description ==
The length of the shell attains 4 mm, its diameter 1.5 mm.

(Original description) The small, solid shell is biconical. Its colour is a uniform pale buff. The shell contains 7 whorls. The protoconch consists of two small smooth helicoid whorls.

Sculpture:—The first adult whorl shows numerous small radial riblets. On the subsequent whorls the ribs are spaced seven to a whorl. They are continuous, perpendicular, and elevated. The spirals are prominent cords which project at the intersection of the ribs, two on the upper whorls and twelve on the body whorl, evenly distributed from the shoulder to the anterior extremity. The aperture is narrow. The varix is broad and high, of the same calibre as the ribs. The sinus is small and shallow. Within the aperture is a small denticule at each side of the sinus, and a small deeply-seated fold on the columella . The siphonal canal is short and wide.

== Distribution ==
This marine genus occurs in the Gulf of Carpentaria and off Queensland, Australia
