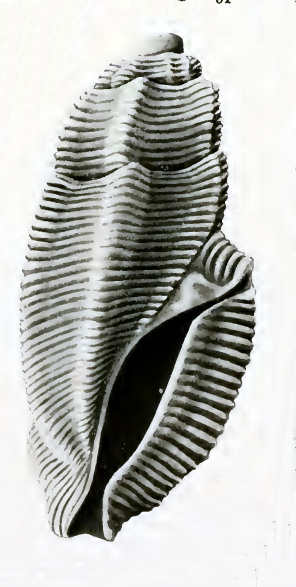
- Original image of a shell of Pseudorhaphitoma calcata

Scientific classification
- Kingdom: Animalia
- Phylum: Mollusca
- Class: Gastropoda
- Subclass: Caenogastropoda
- Order: Neogastropoda
- Superfamily: Conoidea
- Family: Mangeliidae
- Genus: Pseudorhaphitoma
- Species: P. calcata

Binomial name
- Pseudorhaphitoma calcata (Hedley, 1909)

Synonyms
- Mangelia calcata Hedley, 1909 (original combination)

= Pseudorhaphitoma calcata =

Species of gastropod

Pseudorhaphitoma calcata is a small sea snail, a marine gastropod mollusk in the family Mangeliidae.

== Description ==
The length of the shell attains 3.6 mm, its diameter 1.5 mm.

(Original description) The small, solid shell is ovate and turreted. Its colour is uniform grey.. On the holotype four whorls are remaining (the apex missing in the only example seen]).

Sculpture : oblique, wave-like, radial folds, five to a whorl, expanded and projecting prominently at the summit of each whorl. The whole surface overrun by fine, close-packed, spiral threads. The aperture is linear. The anal sulcus is an almost closed tube at the top of a bold varix. The outer lip is insinuate near the base. The siphonal canal is very short. The subtubular posterior notch and the closely corded sculpture are both peculiar.

== Distribution ==
This marine genus occurs in the Gulf of Carpentaria and off Queensland and Hope Island, Australia
