= Pseudorhaphitoma kilburni =

Scientific classification
- Kingdom: Animalia
- Phylum: Mollusca
- Class: Gastropoda
- Subclass: Caenogastropoda
- Order: Neogastropoda
- Superfamily: Conoidea
- Family: Mangeliidae
- Genus: Pseudorhaphitoma
- Species: P. kilburni

Binomial name
- Pseudorhaphitoma kilburni Morassi & Bonfitto, 2001

Species of gastropod

Pseudorhaphitoma kilburni is a small sea snail, a marine gastropod mollusk in the family Mangeliidae.

== Distribution ==
This marine species occurs in the Red Sea and off Yemen
