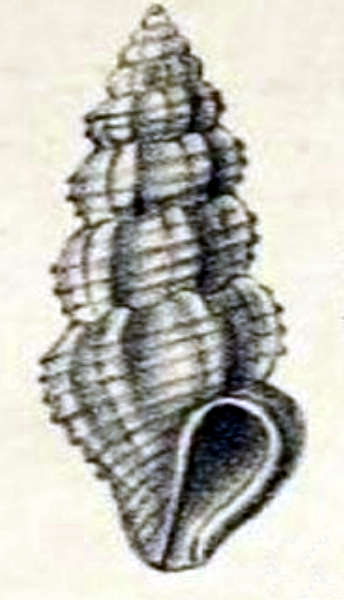
- Original image of a shell of Pseudorhaphitoma perlonga

Scientific classification
- Kingdom: Animalia
- Phylum: Mollusca
- Class: Gastropoda
- Subclass: Caenogastropoda
- Order: Neogastropoda
- Superfamily: Conoidea
- Family: Mangeliidae
- Genus: Pseudorhaphitoma
- Species: P. perlonga

Binomial name
- Pseudorhaphitoma perlonga (Melvill, 1899)

Synonyms
- Mangilia perlonga Melvill, 1899 (original combination)

= Pseudorhaphitoma perlonga =

Species of gastropod

Pseudorhaphitoma perlonga is a small sea snail, a marine gastropod mollusk in the family Mangeliidae.

== Description ==
The length of the shell attains 9 mm, its diameter 2 mm.

(Original description) A very attenuate, fusiform, solid species. It is eight-whorled, inclusive of the two glassy shining apical, longitudinally strongly ribbed. The shell contains few ribs, seven on the body whorl, crossed spirally with few intersecting lirae, and between these run many fine striations. The aperture is ovate. The outer lip is thickened. The sinus is very obscure. The columella is straight. The siphonal canal is short.

== Distribution ==
This marine species occurs off Pakistan
