= Pseudorhaphitoma heptagona =

Scientific classification
- Kingdom: Animalia
- Phylum: Mollusca
- Class: Gastropoda
- Subclass: Caenogastropoda
- Order: Neogastropoda
- Superfamily: Conoidea
- Family: Mangeliidae
- Genus: Pseudorhaphitoma
- Species: P. heptagona

Binomial name
- Pseudorhaphitoma heptagona (Dunker, 1871)

Synonyms
- Clathurella heptagona Dunker, 1871 (original combination)

Species of gastropod

Pseudorhaphitoma heptagona is a small sea snail, a marine gastropod mollusk in the family Mangeliidae.

== Description ==
The length of the shell attains 5 mm, its diameter is 2 mm.

(Original description in latin) The shell is very small, fusiform, and whitish-yellow. It has seven convex whorls that are angular in the middle. The shell bears seven longitudinal ribs, together with raised transverse striae. The outer lip is thickened and obsoletely sulcate on the inside. The sinus is not deep.

== Distribution ==
This marine species occurs off Samoa.
