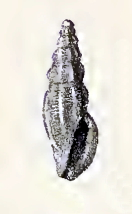
- Original image of a shell of Pseudorhaphitoma agna

Scientific classification
- Kingdom: Animalia
- Phylum: Mollusca
- Class: Gastropoda
- Subclass: Caenogastropoda
- Order: Neogastropoda
- Superfamily: Conoidea
- Family: Mangeliidae
- Genus: Pseudorhaphitoma
- Species: P. agna

Binomial name
- Pseudorhaphitoma agna (Melvill & Standen, 1896)

Synonyms
- Mangilia agna Melvill & Standen, 1896 (original combination)

= Pseudorhaphitoma agna =

Species of gastropod

Pseudorhaphitoma agna is a small sea snail, a marine gastropod mollusk in the family Mangeliidae.

== Description ==
The length of the shell attains 5.5 mm, its diameter 2 mm.

(Original description) A pure milky white much attenuate species, sometimes with a pale ochraceous dorsal clouding. It contains 7 to 8 ventricose whorls. It shows longitudinally few ribs. These are decurrent and descending in the same plane from whorl to whorl, transversely very finely striolate, the striae surrounding the whole shell, including the ribs. The aperture is obliquely oblong. The sinus is inconspicuous. The outer lip is effuse, and, as well as the columella, quite simple within.

== Distribution ==
This marine genus occurs off New Caledonia
