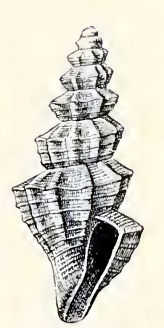
- Original image of a shell of Saccharoturris consentanea

Scientific classification
- Kingdom: Animalia
- Phylum: Mollusca
- Class: Gastropoda
- Subclass: Caenogastropoda
- Order: Neogastropoda
- Superfamily: Conoidea
- Family: Mangeliidae
- Genus: Saccharoturris
- Species: S. consentanea

Binomial name
- Saccharoturris consentanea (R.J.L. Guppy, 1896)

Synonyms
- † Mangilia consentanea R.J.L. Guppy, 1896

= Saccharoturris consentanea =

Extinct species of gastropod

Saccharoturris consentanea is an extinct species of sea snail and was a marine gastropod mollusk in the family Mangeliidae.

== Description ==
The length of the shell attains 6.2 mm and a diameter of 2.7 mm.

The fusiform-turreted shell contains about 8 whorls. These are sharply angulate, spirally lirate, the strongest thread forming the angle of the whorls and rising like the other threads into knobs upon the longitudinally elongate or variciform tubercles. The surface of the whorl above the keel is minutely lirate by fine spiral threads. The aperture is elongate, terminating in a moderate siphonal canal.

== Distribution ==
This extinct marine species was found in Oligocene strata of Jamaica.
