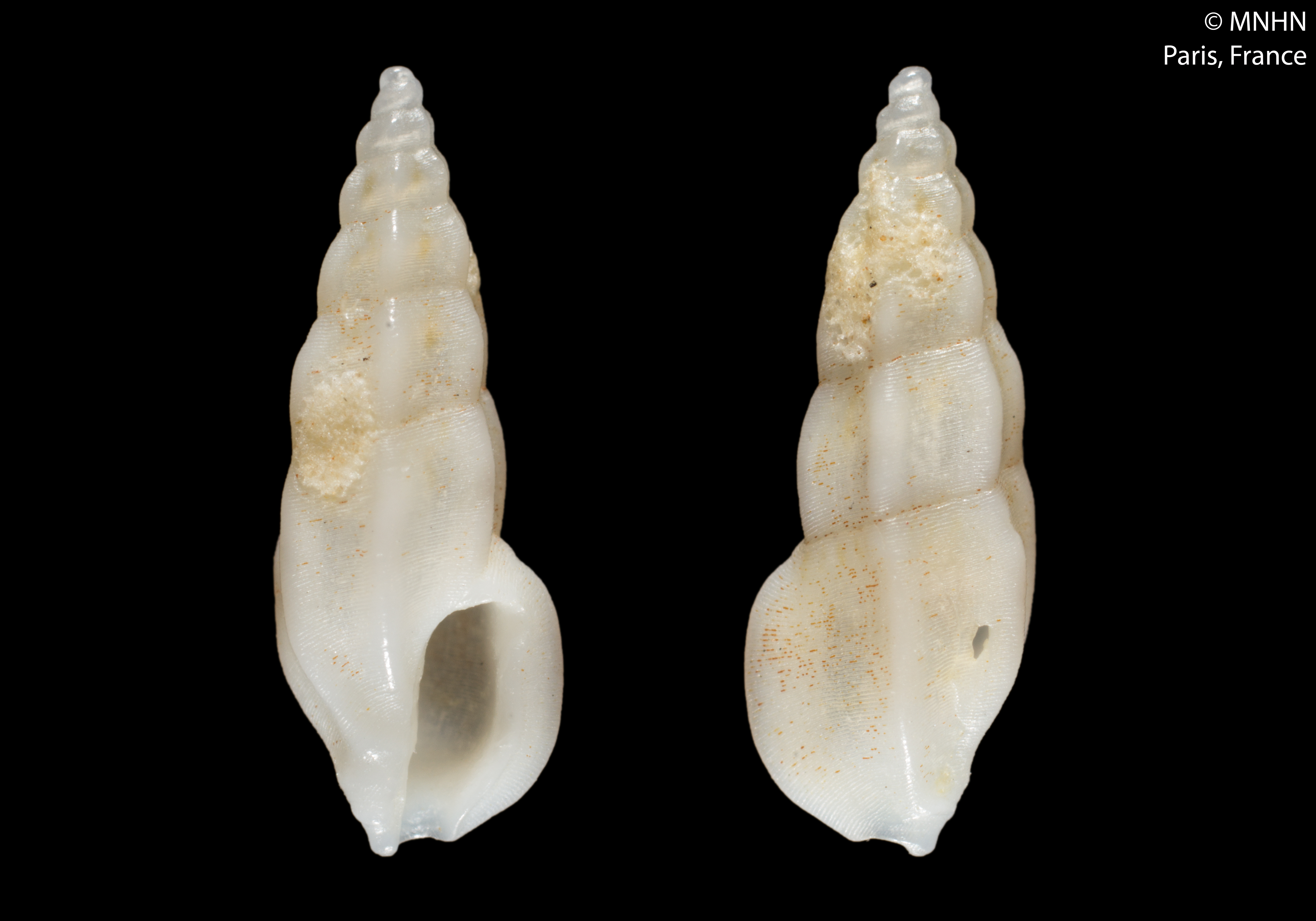
- Shell of Pseudorhaphitoma confortinii (holotype at MNHN? Paris)

Scientific classification
- Kingdom: Animalia
- Phylum: Mollusca
- Class: Gastropoda
- Subclass: Caenogastropoda
- Order: Neogastropoda
- Superfamily: Conoidea
- Family: Mangeliidae
- Genus: Pseudorhaphitoma
- Species: P. confortinii

Binomial name
- Pseudorhaphitoma confortinii Bozzetti, 2007

Synonyms
- Pseudoraphitoma confortinii Bozzetti, 2007 (incorrect spelling of generic name)

= Pseudorhaphitoma confortinii =

Species of gastropod

Pseudorhaphitoma confortinii is a small sea snail, a marine gastropod mollusk in the family Mangeliidae.

== Description ==
The length of the shell attains 7.5 mm.

== Distribution ==
This marine genus occurs off Madagascar.
