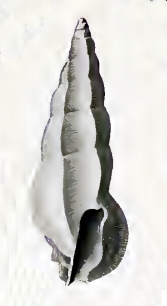
- Image of a shell of Pseudorhaphitoma alticostata

Scientific classification
- Kingdom: Animalia
- Phylum: Mollusca
- Class: Gastropoda
- Subclass: Caenogastropoda
- Order: Neogastropoda
- Superfamily: Conoidea
- Family: Mangeliidae
- Genus: Pseudorhaphitoma
- Species: P. alticostata

Binomial name
- Pseudorhaphitoma alticostata (G. B. Sowerby III, 1896)

Synonyms
- Daphnella (Mangilia) alticostata (G.B. Sowerby III, 1897); Mangilia alticostata G. B. Sowerby III, 1896 (original combination); Pseudoraphitoma alticostata (G.B. Sowerby III, 1897)

= Pseudorhaphitoma alticostata =

Species of gastropod

Pseudorhaphitoma alticostata is a small sea snail, a marine gastropod mollusk in the family Mangeliidae.

== Description ==
The length of the shell varies between 9 mm and 13 mm.

(Original description) The whitish, hexagonal shell has an elongate-fusiform shape. The very elongated spire has an acute apex. It contains eight, rather flat whorls. These are spirally striate and show prominently six, very sharp, continuous axial ribs. .The body whorl is short), obtusely angulate, and has a constricted base. The aperture is oblong and short. The outer lip is sharp.

== Distribution ==
This marine genus occurs off the Philippines, New South Wales, and South Australia.
