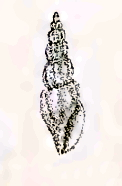
- Original image of a shell of Pseudorhaphitoma brionae

Scientific classification
- Kingdom: Animalia
- Phylum: Mollusca
- Class: Gastropoda
- Subclass: Caenogastropoda
- Order: Neogastropoda
- Superfamily: Conoidea
- Family: Mangeliidae
- Genus: Pseudorhaphitoma
- Species: P. brionae

Binomial name
- Pseudorhaphitoma brionae (G.B. Sowerby III, 1888)

Synonyms
- Mangelia brionae (Sowerby III, 1888); Pleurotoma (Mangelia) brionae Sowerby III, 1888 (original combination)

= Pseudorhaphitoma brionae =

Species of gastropod

Pseudorhaphitoma brionae is a small sea snail, a marine gastropod mollusk in the family Mangeliidae.

== Description ==
The length of the shell attains 20 mm, its diameter 6 mm

The dark red shell has a very long and turreted spire. The shell contains 9 whorls. It is smooth, and the very fine spiral striae can only be seen through a lens. The 10 longitudinal ribs are rounded and smooth, but become acuminate at the base of the shell. The body whorl is small and slightly convex. The oblong aperture is broad in the middle and narrow at the extremities. The columella is perpendicular. The outer lip is arcuate and slightly insinuate at the base.

== Distribution ==
This marine genus occurs off Hong Kong.
