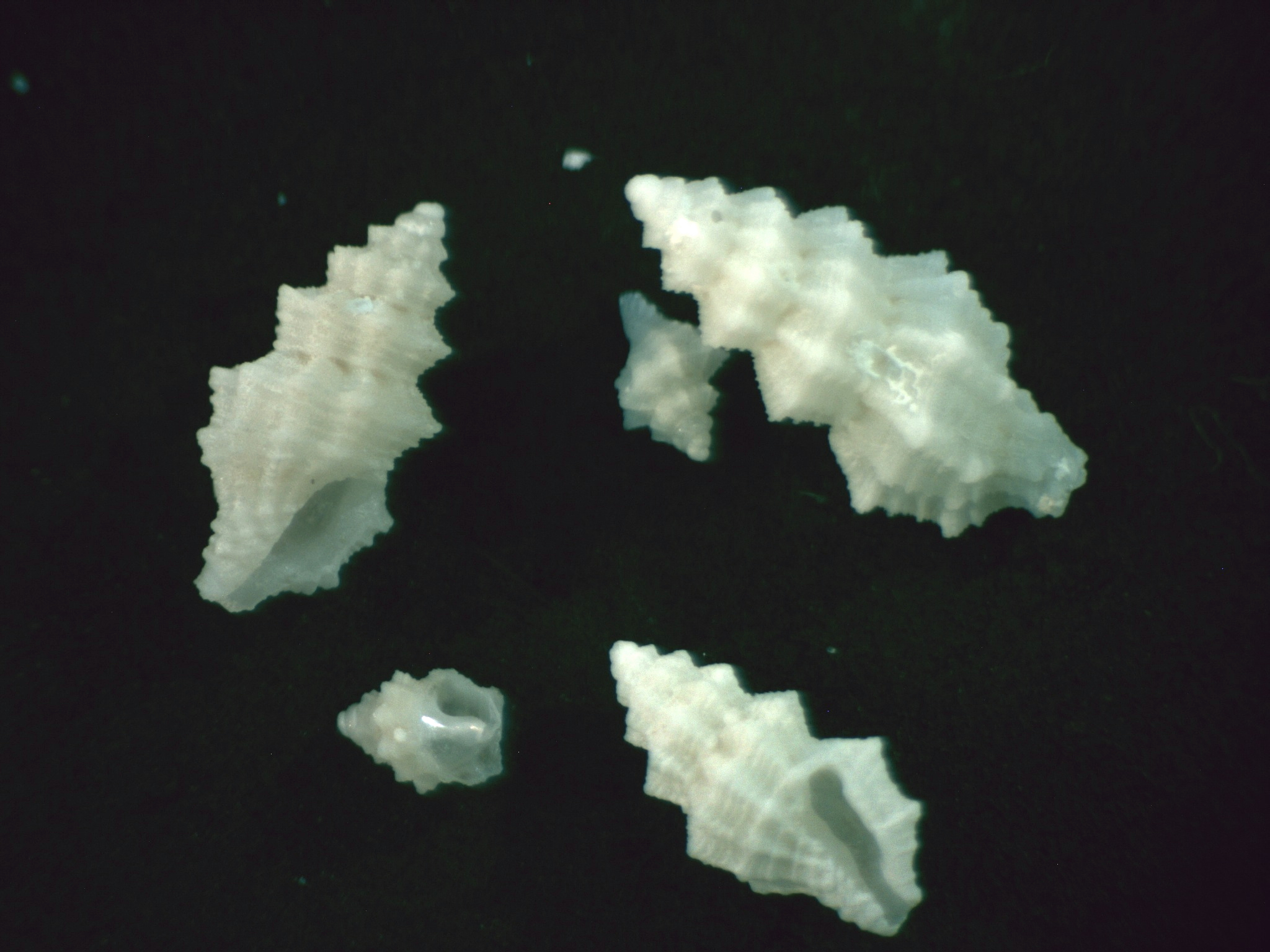
- Shells of Glyphoturris rugirima (museum specimens)

Scientific classification
- Kingdom: Animalia
- Phylum: Mollusca
- Class: Gastropoda
- Subclass: Caenogastropoda
- Order: Neogastropoda
- Superfamily: Conoidea
- Family: Mangeliidae
- Genus: Glyphoturris
- Species: G. rugirima

Binomial name
- Glyphoturris rugirima (Dall, 1889)

Synonyms
- Glyphoturris quadrata rugirima (Dall, 1889); Mangilia rugirima Dall, 1889

= Glyphoturris rugirima =

Species of gastropod

Glyphoturris rugirima is a species of sea snail, a marine gastropod mollusc in the family Mangeliidae.

== Description ==
The length of the shell varies between 5 mm and 8 mm.

This species differs from Glyphoturris diminuta in being smaller and shorter proportionally, and with the strength of the sculpture even more exaggerated.

== Distribution ==
G. rugirima can be found in Atlantic Ocean waters, ranging from the eastern coast of Florida south to Brazil and surrounding Bermuda.; in the Gulf of Mexico and the Caribbean Sea.
