= Pseudorhaphitoma uncicostata =

Scientific classification
- Kingdom: Animalia
- Phylum: Mollusca
- Class: Gastropoda
- Subclass: Caenogastropoda
- Order: Neogastropoda
- Superfamily: Conoidea
- Family: Mangeliidae
- Genus: Pseudorhaphitoma
- Species: P. uncicostata

Binomial name
- Pseudorhaphitoma uncicostata Kilburn & Dekker, 2008

Species of gastropod

Pseudorhaphitoma uncicostata is a small sea snail, a marine gastropod mollusk in the family Mangeliidae.

== Description ==
The length of the shell attains 10 mm.

== Distribution ==
This marine species occurs in the Red Sea
