= Pseudorhaphitoma severa =

Scientific classification
- Kingdom: Animalia
- Phylum: Mollusca
- Class: Gastropoda
- Subclass: Caenogastropoda
- Order: Neogastropoda
- Superfamily: Conoidea
- Family: Mangeliidae
- Genus: Pseudorhaphitoma
- Species: P. severa

Binomial name
- Pseudorhaphitoma severa (Thiele, 1925)

Synonyms
- Mangelia (Pseudorhaphitoma) severa Thiele, 1925 (original combination)

Species of gastropod

Pseudorhaphitoma severa is a small sea snail, a marine gastropod mollusk in the family Mangeliidae.

== Description ==
The length of the shell attains 6.1 mm, its diameter is 2.2 mm.

== Distribution ==
This marine genus occurs off Sumatra, Indonesia.
