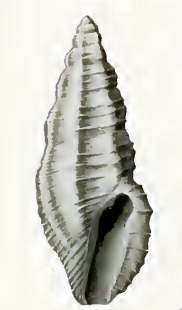
- Original image of a shell of Pseudorhaphitoma bipyramidata

Scientific classification
- Kingdom: Animalia
- Phylum: Mollusca
- Class: Gastropoda
- Subclass: Caenogastropoda
- Order: Neogastropoda
- Superfamily: Conoidea
- Family: Mangeliidae
- Genus: Pseudorhaphitoma
- Species: P. bipyramidata

Binomial name
- Pseudorhaphitoma bipyramidata Hedley, 1922

= Pseudorhaphitoma bipyramidata =

Species of gastropod

Pseudorhaphitoma bipyramidata is a small sea snail, a marine gastropod mollusk in the family Mangeliidae.

== Description ==
The length of the shell attains 5 mm (0.20 in), its diameter 2 mm (0.079 in).

(Original description) The small, rather solid shell is lanceolate. Its colour is a uniform white. The shell contains 8 whorls, including the protoconch. The latter has 2½ whorls, the first two being smooth and helicoid. The next half whorl carries about ten sharp, narrow, arcuate, radiate riblets, quite discordant with the succeeding sculpture. The adult whorl begins abruptly with seven prominent ribs, which descend the whorls vertically and continuously. These are traversed by spaced spiral cords which commence with two on the third whorl and end with seventeen on the body whorl. Between these cords run from two to six rows of densely packed microscopic grains. The aperture is sublinear. The thick and outstanding varix extends a broad lip over the aperture. The sinus is semicircular, cut out of the varix, with a substantial tubercle on the right and another on the left. There are no other teeth within either lip. On the columella is a thick and smooth sheet of callus.

== Distribution ==
This marine genus occurs off Korea, the Gulf of Carpentaria and Queensland, Australia
