= Pseudorhaphitoma tropica =

Scientific classification
- Kingdom: Animalia
- Phylum: Mollusca
- Class: Gastropoda
- Subclass: Caenogastropoda
- Order: Neogastropoda
- Superfamily: Conoidea
- Family: Mangeliidae
- Genus: Pseudorhaphitoma
- Species: P. tropica

Binomial name
- Pseudorhaphitoma tropica (Thiele, 1925)

Synonyms
- Mangelia (Pseudorhaphitoma) tropica Thiele, 1925 (original combination)

Species of gastropod

Pseudorhaphitoma tropica is a small sea snail, a marine gastropod mollusk in the family Mangeliidae.

== Description ==
The length of the shell varies between 4 mm and 5 mm, its diameter 1.6 mm. The shell has a claviform shape.

== Distribution ==
This marine genus occurs off Sumatra, Indonesia. It lives in coral reefs.
