= Pseudorhaphitoma naganumaensis =

Scientific classification
- Kingdom: Animalia
- Phylum: Mollusca
- Class: Gastropoda
- Subclass: Caenogastropoda
- Order: Neogastropoda
- Superfamily: Conoidea
- Family: Mangeliidae
- Genus: Pseudorhaphitoma
- Species: P. naganumaensis

Binomial name
- Pseudorhaphitoma naganumaensis Otuka, 1935

Species of gastropod

Pseudorhaphitoma naganumaensis is a small sea snail (a marine gastropod mollusk) in the family Mangeliidae. P. Naganumaensis was discovered by otuka in 1935

== Distribution ==
P. Naganumaensis marine species occurs off the Noto peninsula, Japan
