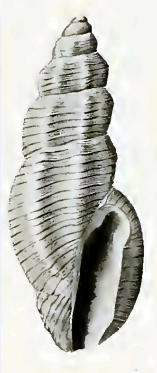
- Original image of a shell of Pseudorhaphitoma hervieri

Scientific classification
- Kingdom: Animalia
- Phylum: Mollusca
- Class: Gastropoda
- Subclass: Caenogastropoda
- Order: Neogastropoda
- Superfamily: Conoidea
- Family: Mangeliidae
- Genus: Pseudorhaphitoma
- Species: P. hervieri

Binomial name
- Pseudorhaphitoma hervieri (Hedley, 1922)

Synonyms
- Anacithara hervieri Hedley, 1922 superseded combination

= Pseudorhaphitoma hervieri =

Species of gastropod

Pseudorhaphitoma hervieri is a species of sea snail, a marine gastropod mollusk in the family Mangeliidae.

== Description ==
The length of the shell attains 5 mm, its diameter 2 mm.

(Original description) The small, elongate shell has a turreted shape. Its colour is dull white. The protoconch is pale primrose yellow. The shell contains six whorls. The ribs are low, distant, perpendicular, angled at the shoulder, running from suture to base, but not continuing from one whorl to another. They number seven on the penultimate whorl. The spirals are very slender and widely spaced threads, between which are a few still finer threads. Of the major series there are twelve on the last and four on the penultimate whorl. The open aperture is unarmed save for a tubercle on either side of the sinus. The varix is well developed. The sinus is wide and shallow. The siphonal canal is merely a notch.

== Distribution ==
This marine species is endemic to Australia and occurs off Queensland.
