= Pseudorhaphitoma alma =

Scientific classification
- Kingdom: Animalia
- Phylum: Mollusca
- Class: Gastropoda
- Subclass: Caenogastropoda
- Order: Neogastropoda
- Superfamily: Conoidea
- Family: Mangeliidae
- Genus: Pseudorhaphitoma
- Species: P. alma

Binomial name
- Pseudorhaphitoma alma (Thiele, 1925)

Synonyms
- Mangelia (Pseudorhaphitoma) alma Thiele, 1925 (original combination)

Species of sea snail

Pseudorhaphitoma alma is a small sea snail, a marine gastropod mollusk in the family Mangeliidae.

== Description ==
The length of the shell varies between 5 and 6 mm.

== Distribution ==
This marine genus occurs off Zanzibar and East Africa.
