= Pseudorhaphitoma pyramidalis =

Scientific classification
- Kingdom: Animalia
- Phylum: Mollusca
- Class: Gastropoda
- Subclass: Caenogastropoda
- Order: Neogastropoda
- Superfamily: Conoidea
- Family: Mangeliidae
- Genus: Pseudorhaphitoma
- Species: P. pyramidalis

Binomial name
- Pseudorhaphitoma pyramidalis (Reeve, 1846)

Synonyms
- Mangelia pyramidalis Reeve, 1846 (original combination)

Species of gastropod

Pseudorhaphitoma pyramidalis is a small sea snail, a marine gastropod mollusk in the family Mangeliidae.

== Description ==
The length of the shell attains 7 mm.

The white shell has a turreted pyramidal shape. The sculpture consists of longitudinal ribs, striated between the interstices. The aperture is small and short.

== Distribution ==
This marine species occurs off the Philippines
