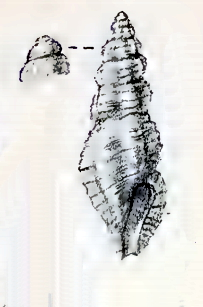
- Shell and protoconch of Pseudorhaphitoma scitula

Scientific classification
- Domain: Eukaryota
- Kingdom: Animalia
- Phylum: Mollusca
- Class: Gastropoda
- Subclass: Caenogastropoda
- Order: Neogastropoda
- Superfamily: Conoidea
- Family: Mangeliidae
- Genus: Pseudorhaphitoma
- Species: P. scitula

Binomial name
- Pseudorhaphitoma scitula (E. A. Smith, 1884)

Synonyms
- Mangilia scitula Melvill, 1917; Pleurotoma (Mangilia) scitula E. A. Smith, 1888 (original combination)

= Pseudorhaphitoma scitula =

Species of gastropod

Pseudorhaphitoma scitula is a small sea snail, a marine gastropod mollusk in the family Mangeliidae.

== Description ==
The length of the shell attains 6.7 mm, its diameter 2.2 mm.

This abundant little white species, has a fusiform shape narrowed below, with swollen upper whorls, and coarse spiral lirae, hexagonal, with very beautiful spiral, minutely punctate striae between the lirations just mentioned. The aperture is rather small, proportionately speaking

== Distribution ==
This marine species occurs in the Persian Gulf and the Gulf of Oman.
