= Glyphoturris eritima =

Scientific classification
- Kingdom: Animalia
- Phylum: Mollusca
- Class: Gastropoda
- Subclass: Caenogastropoda
- Order: Neogastropoda
- Superfamily: Conoidea
- Family: Mangeliidae
- Genus: Glyphoturris
- Species: G. eritima

Binomial name
- Glyphoturris eritima (Bush K.J., 1885)

Synonyms
- Kurtziella eritima (K.J. Bush, 1885); Mangilia eritima K.J. Bush, 1885 (original combination)

Species of gastropod

Glyphoturris eritima is a species of sea snail, a marine gastropod mollusk in the family Mangeliidae.

== Description ==
The length of the shell varies between 4 mm and 8 mm.

(Original description) The shell is large for the genus. It is composed of eight very angular whorls, which form a sharp pointed, regularly tapered, turreted spire. The protoconch is very small, regularly coiled, consisting of two and a half shining, light yellow whorls in striking contrast to the dull, rough surface peculiar to the rest of the shell. The first one and a half whorls are perfectly smooth, while the last one is crossed by minute, transverse riblets. The suture is marked by a conspicuous, rounded, undulating cingulus (= colored bands or spiral ornamentation) or thread on the preceding whorl. The sculpture consists of prominent, straight, angular, alternating ribs (nine on the body whorl), forming a conspicuous node at the angle, extending from suture to suture. These, with their deeply concave interspaces, are crossed by unequal, conspicuous, well-rounded, granulated cinguli and microscopic threads. The first cingulus, defining the shoulder of the whorls, is double with the upper half slightly the larger, the sutural one is the next in size, while between these there are two still finer ones. These are unequally distant from each other, the first and second being much closer together than the others, and the intervening surfaces are covered by unequal, microscopic threads. Above the angle of the whorls the threads alone occur and number about nine. This inequality in the spiral sculpture makes the edges of the transverse ribs very rough and jagged. On the body whorl there are about thirteen cinguli below the shoulder, unequal in size and unequally separated, those on the siphonal canal larger and closer together than those just above it, while the fourth one below the angle is so prominent as to make a slight angle in the outline of the whorl. Below this angle the transverse ribs curve in toward the columella following the outline of the outer lip, and extend to the end of the siphonal canal, the curvature being most noticeable in a dorsal view. Very fine striae intersect the cinguli and the threads in the direction of the lines of growth, rendering them granular and give the appearance to the shell, when dry, of being covered with a fine, gray dust. The aperture is long, narrowly ovate, with a moderately long, rather narrow siphonal canal. The outer lip is not thickened, and shows a comparatively thin edge and a broad, moderately deep sinus extending from the suture to the angle. The columella is slightly curved. The inner lip is marked by a narrow stripe of conspicuous red enamel. The color of the shell is light yellow-brown. The interior of the aperture is of the same conspicuous red color as the inner lip. In young specimens this coloring is wanting.

== Distribution ==
G. eritima can be found in Atlantic, ranging from the North Carolina seaboard along the coast to Louisiana. and in the Gulf of Mexico.

Fossils have been found in the Pliocene and the Quaternary of the United States; age range: 2.588 to 0.781 Ma.
