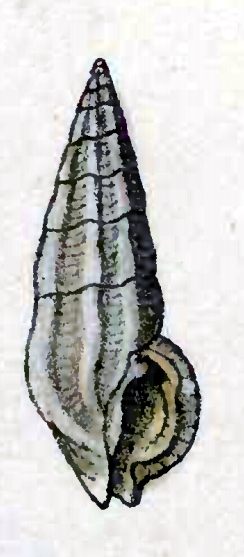
- Drawing of a shell of Pseudorhaphitoma hexagonalis

Scientific classification
- Kingdom: Animalia
- Phylum: Mollusca
- Class: Gastropoda
- Subclass: Caenogastropoda
- Order: Neogastropoda
- Superfamily: Conoidea
- Family: Mangeliidae
- Genus: Pseudorhaphitoma
- Species: P. hexagonalis

Binomial name
- Pseudorhaphitoma hexagonalis (Reeve, 1845)

Synonyms
- Daphnella (Mangilia) hexagonalis (Reeve, 1845); Mangilia hexagonalis Tryon, 1884; Pleurotoma hexagonalis Reeve, 1845 (original combination)

= Pseudorhaphitoma hexagonalis =

Species of gastropod

Pseudorhaphitoma hexagonalis is a small sea snail, a marine gastropod mollusk in the family Mangeliidae.

== Description ==
The length of the shell varies between 8 mm and 11 mm.

The yellowish white shell shows six distant longitudinal continuous ribs, and rather close revolving striae

== Distribution ==
This marine species occurs the island of Bohol, the Philippines, and the Kai Islands, Indonesia.
