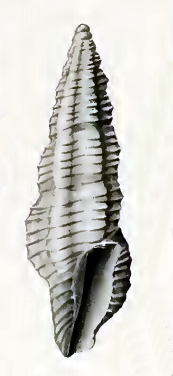
- Apertural view of a shell of Pseudorhaphitoma darnleyi

Scientific classification
- Kingdom: Animalia
- Phylum: Mollusca
- Class: Gastropoda
- Subclass: Caenogastropoda
- Order: Neogastropoda
- Superfamily: Conoidea
- Family: Mangeliidae
- Genus: Pseudorhaphitoma
- Species: P. darnleyi

Binomial name
- Pseudorhaphitoma darnleyi (Brazier, 1876)

Synonyms
- Clathurella darnleyi Brazier, 1876 (original combination); Mangelia darnleyensis Tryon, 1884

= Pseudorhaphitoma darnleyi =

Species of gastropod

Pseudorhaphitoma darnleyi is a small sea snail, a marine gastropod mollusk in the family Mangeliidae.

== Description ==
The length of the shell attains 12 mm.

(Original description) The slender pyramidal shell is acuminated. It is six-sided, horny brown, longitudinally ribbed, crossed with raised striae, somewhat rugose and with smooth interstices. The shell contains 7-8 flattened whorls. The suture is opaque. The sculpture is much plainer on the body whorl. The inner lip shows a thin deposit of callus. The outer lip is thin, edged with black. The sinus is wide, cut deep down. The siphonal canal is short.

The slender, six-sided shell has a pyramidal shape. It is longitudinally ribbed and crossed with raised striae, somewhat rugose, interstices smooth. It contains 7 to 8 flattened whorls. The outer lip is slightly varicose. The sinus is wide and deep. The color is yellowish brown, the lip sometimes black-edged.

This species is remarkable by the absence of fine grained spirals and is by this an aberrant members of this genus.

== Distribution ==
This marine genus is endemic to Australia and occurs in the Gulf of Carpentaria and off Queensland, Australia
