= Pseudorhaphitoma obturata =

Scientific classification
- Kingdom: Animalia
- Phylum: Mollusca
- Class: Gastropoda
- Subclass: Caenogastropoda
- Order: Neogastropoda
- Superfamily: Conoidea
- Family: Mangeliidae
- Genus: Pseudorhaphitoma
- Species: P. obturata

Binomial name
- Pseudorhaphitoma obturata Kilburn, 1993

Species of gastropod

Pseudorhaphitoma obturata is a small sea snail, a marine gastropod mollusk in the family Mangeliidae.

== Description ==
The length of the shell varies between 4 mm and 9 mm.

== Distribution ==
This marine genus occurs off Southeast Africa.
