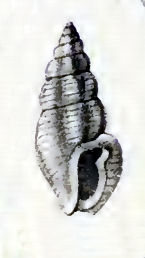
- Original image of a shell of Pseudorhaphitoma averina

Scientific classification
- Kingdom: Animalia
- Phylum: Mollusca
- Class: Gastropoda
- Subclass: Caenogastropoda
- Order: Neogastropoda
- Superfamily: Conoidea
- Family: Mangeliidae
- Genus: Pseudorhaphitoma
- Species: P. averina

Binomial name
- Pseudorhaphitoma averina (Melvill & Standen, 1901)

Synonyms
- Mangilia averina Melvill & Standen, 1901 (original combination)

= Pseudorhaphitoma averina =

Species of gastropod

Pseudorhaphitoma averina is a small sea snail, a marine gastropod mollusk in the family Mangeliidae.

== Description ==
The length of the shell attains 6 mm, its diameter 2.75 mm.

(Original description) A stout, pure white little shell with an ovate-fusiform shape. It contains 7 whorls of which two in the protoconch. It has strong ribs (7 in the body whorl), crossed by alternate strong or thin lirae, and gemmuled at the points of junction. The ovate aperture is narrow. The incrassate outer lip and the columellar area are beautifully suffused with orange-yellow.

== Distribution ==
This marine genus occurs off Pakistan
