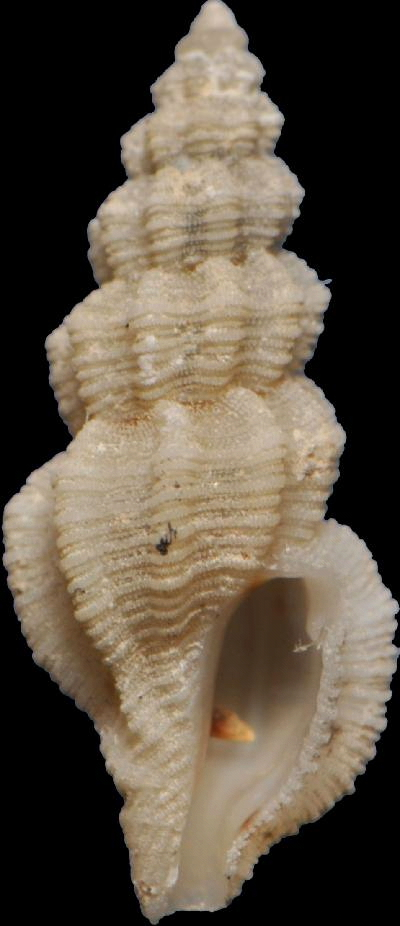
- Shell of Glyphoturris quadrata (museum specimen at MNHN, Paris)

Scientific classification
- Kingdom: Animalia
- Phylum: Mollusca
- Class: Gastropoda
- Subclass: Caenogastropoda
- Order: Neogastropoda
- Superfamily: Conoidea
- Family: Mangeliidae
- Genus: Glyphoturris
- Species: G. quadrata

Binomial name
- Glyphoturris quadrata (Reeve, 1845)

Synonyms
- Clathurella quadrata (Reeve, 1845); Defrancia quadrata (Reeve, 1845); Glyphoturris diminuta (C. B. Adams, 1850); Mangelia diminuta Adams, C.B., 1850; Mangelia quadrata (Reeve, 1845); Mangilia quadrata (Reeve, 1845); Pleurotoma quadrata Reeve, 1845; Pleurotomoides quadrata L.A. Reeve, 1845

= Glyphoturris quadrata =

Species of gastropod

Glyphoturris quadrata, common name the square glyph-turrid, is a species of small carnivorous sea snail, a marine gastropod mollusk in the family Mangeliidae.

The subspecies Glyphoturris quadrata rugirima (Dall, 1889) is a synonym of Glyphoturris rugirima (Dall, 1889)

== Distribution ==
G. quadrata can be found in Atlantic waters, ranging from the eastern coast of Florida and the Gulf of Mexico, south to Brazil, and also surrounding Bermuda.

== Description ==
The size of the shell varies between 4 mm and 6.8 mm.

The shell is strongly biangulated on the body whorl. The ribs are distant and conspicuous. The revolving sculpture is fine and close. The color of the shell is whitish or yellowish. The interstices of the ribs often are chestnut-colored.

Glyphoturris diminuta was previously thought to differ from Glyphoturris quadrata (Reeve, 1845) in the greater strength of the sculpture. The aperture and the columella are white.
