= Pseudorhaphitoma granilirata =

Scientific classification
- Domain: Eukaryota
- Kingdom: Animalia
- Phylum: Mollusca
- Class: Gastropoda
- Subclass: Caenogastropoda
- Order: Neogastropoda
- Superfamily: Conoidea
- Family: Mangeliidae
- Genus: Pseudorhaphitoma
- Species: P. granilirata

Binomial name
- Pseudorhaphitoma granilirata (E. A. Smith, 1888)

Synonyms
- Pleurotoma (Mangilia) granilirata E. A. Smith, 1888 (original combination)

Species of gastropod

Pseudorhaphitoma granilirata is a small sea snail, a marine gastropod mollusk in the family Mangeliidae.

Kilburn had the strong impression that this species is a subjective senior synonym of Pseudorhaphitoma crudelis, except for the fact of the presence of 8 ribs in P. granilirata and 7 in P. crudelis.

== Description ==
The length of the shell attains 5.6 mm, its diameter 2 mm.

The whitish shell has an elongate-subpyramidal shape. It contains 7-8 whorls, of which two in the conical protoconch. The others are slightly convex and show eight, almost straight ribs extending to the base of the body whorl. The spiral lirations which cover the entire surface are beautifully minutely granulous. These lirations number 2-3 in the spire whorls, and about twelve in the body whorl. The slightly red aperture is small and measures about 1/3 of the total length of the shell. The outer lip is extra incrassate. Of the four or five little teeth within the outer lip, the upper one, which is situated just below the slight sinus, is the largest. The siphonal canal is narrow and short.

== Distribution ==
Unknown type locality in the tropical Indo-Pacific.
