= Rugulina monterosatoi =

Scientific classification
- Kingdom: Animalia
- Phylum: Mollusca
- Class: Gastropoda
- Subclass: Vetigastropoda
- Family: Pendromidae
- Genus: Rugulina
- Species: R. monterosatoi

Binomial name
- Rugulina monterosatoi (van Aartsen & Bogi, 1986)

Species of gastropod

Rugulina monterosatoi is a species of sea snail, a marine gastropod mollusc in the family Pendromidae.
