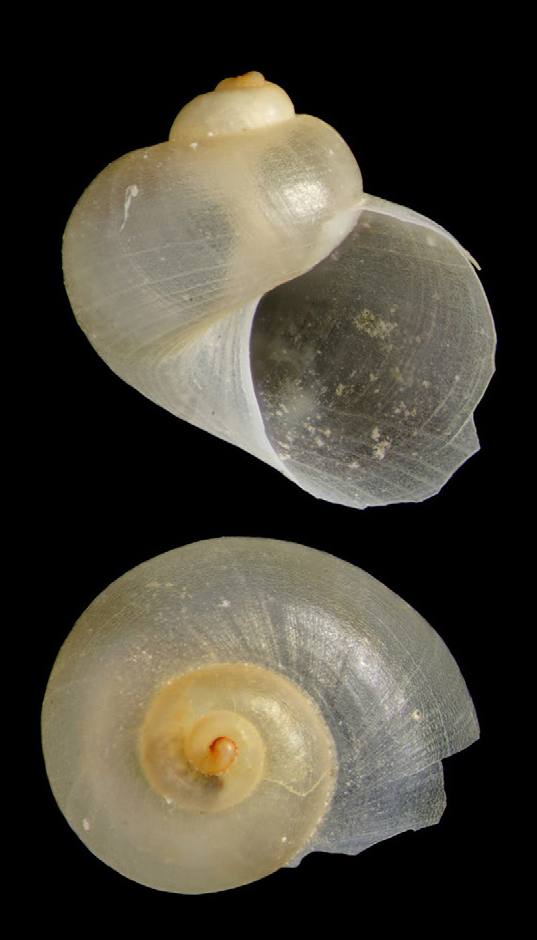
- Shell of Rugulina fragilis

Scientific classification
- Kingdom: Animalia
- Phylum: Mollusca
- Class: Gastropoda
- Subclass: Vetigastropoda
- Family: Pendromidae
- Genus: Rugulina
- Species: R. fragilis

Binomial name
- Rugulina fragilis (Sars, 1878)

Synonyms
- Tornus fragilis Sars, 1878

= Rugulina fragilis =

Species of gastropod

Rugulina fragilis is a species of sea snail, a marine gastropod mollusc in the family Pendromidae.

== Description ==
The length of the shell of the Rugulina Fragilis varies between 1.4 mm and 4 mm.

== Distribution ==
This marine species occurs off Greenland, Iceland, the Faroes and Norway
