= Rugulina ignobilis =

Scientific classification
- Kingdom: Animalia
- Phylum: Mollusca
- Class: Gastropoda
- Subclass: Vetigastropoda
- Family: Pendromidae
- Genus: Rugulina
- Species: R. ignobilis

Binomial name
- Rugulina ignobilis (Thiele, 1912)

Synonyms
- Trachysma ignobile Thiele, 1912

Species of gastropod

Rugulina ignobilis is a species of sea snail, a marine gastropod mollusk in the family Pendromidae.
