= Rugulina antarctica =

Scientific classification
- Kingdom: Animalia
- Phylum: Mollusca
- Class: Gastropoda
- Subclass: Vetigastropoda
- Family: Pendromidae
- Genus: Rugulina
- Species: R. antarctica

Binomial name
- Rugulina antarctica (Numanami, 1996)

Synonyms
- Trachysma antarctica Numanami, 1996

Species of gastropod

Rugulina antarctica is a species of sea snail, a marine gastropod mollusk in the family Pendromidae.
