= Rugulina tenuis =

Scientific classification
- Kingdom: Animalia
- Phylum: Mollusca
- Class: Gastropoda
- Subclass: Vetigastropoda
- Family: Pendromidae
- Genus: Rugulina
- Species: R. tenuis

Binomial name
- Rugulina tenuis (Thiele, 1912)

Synonyms
- Trachysma tenue Thiele, 1912

Species of gastropod

Rugulina tenuis is a species of sea snail, a marine gastropod mollusk in the family Pendromidae.

== Description ==
The shell grows to a length of 2.5 mm.

== Distribution ==
This species occurs in the Weddell Sea, Antarctica.
