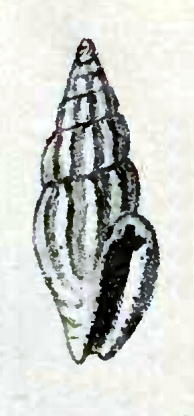
- Image of a shell of Mangelia indistincta

Scientific classification
- Kingdom: Animalia
- Phylum: Mollusca
- Class: Gastropoda
- Subclass: Caenogastropoda
- Order: Neogastropoda
- Superfamily: Conoidea
- Family: Mangeliidae
- Genus: Mangelia
- Species: M. indistincta

Binomial name
- Mangelia indistincta (Monterosato, 1875)

Synonyms
- Mangelia ossea P.M. Pallary, 1920; Mangelia reeveana G.P. Deshayes; Mangilia ossea Pallary, 1920; Mangiliella indistincta (Monterosato, 1875); Pleurotoma indistincta T.A. de M. Monterosato, 1875 (original combination)

= Mangelia indistincta =

Species of gastropod

Mangelia indistincta is a species of sea snail, a marine gastropod mollusk in the family Mangeliidae.

== Description ==
Monterosato based his Pleurotoma indistincta on the Mangilia caerulans as described by Appelius in 1869.

== Distribution ==
This species occurs in the Mediterranean Sea off Southern Italy and Corsica, France..
