= Xerosecta giustii =

Conservation status
- Critically Endangered (IUCN 3.1)

Scientific classification
- Kingdom: Animalia
- Phylum: Mollusca
- Class: Gastropoda
- Order: Stylommatophora
- Family: Geomitridae
- Genus: Xerosecta
- Species: X. giustii

Binomial name
- Xerosecta giustii Manganelli & Favelli, 1996

Species of gastropod

Xerosecta giustii is a species of small air-breathing land snail, a terrestrial pulmonate gastropod mollusk in the family Geomitridae, the hairy snails and their allies.

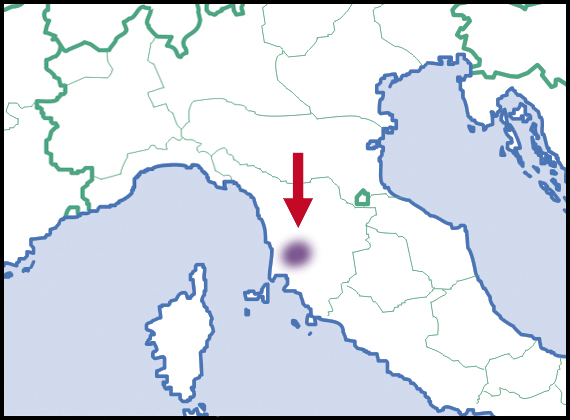
Distribution

This species is endemic to Italy.

Their shell is colored grey to whitish grey with dark reddish brown apex (end). There can be weak and thin interrupted brown bands. The animal is yellowish grey with a pale grey head and neck. The maximum size is 1 inch. Their diet consists of open Mediterranean shrub land vegetation, on the soil and under stones, also on branches of bushes and grass stems. There is only one known population that occupies an area of not more than 100 x 100 m. They are threatened by habitat destruction.
