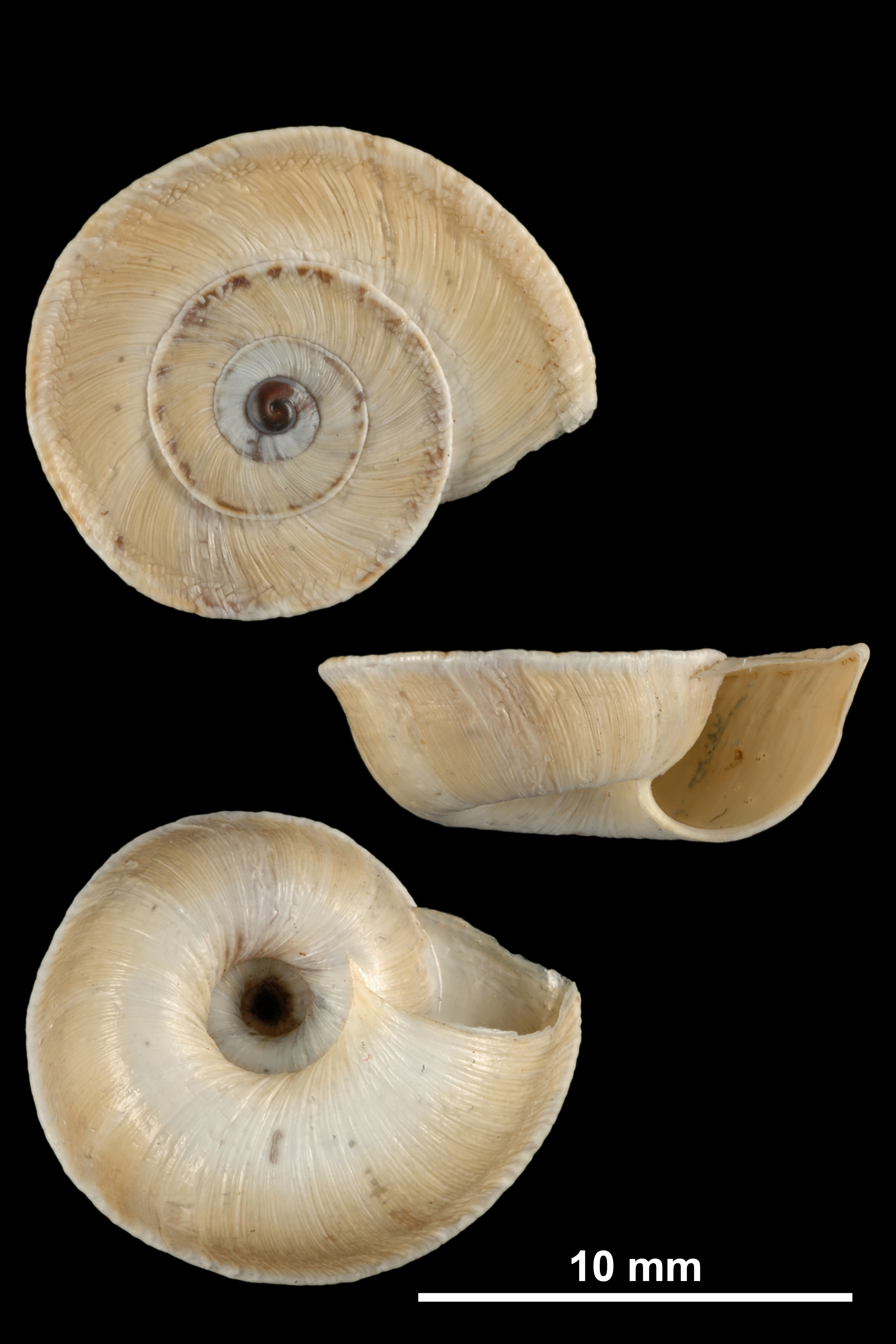
- Shell of Xerosecta explanata (specimen at MNHN, Paris)

Scientific classification
- Kingdom: Animalia
- Phylum: Mollusca
- Class: Gastropoda
- Order: Stylommatophora
- Family: Geomitridae
- Genus: Xerosecta
- Species: X. explanata

Binomial name
- Xerosecta explanata (O. F. Müller, 1774)

Synonyms
- Cernuella (Xerosecta) explanata (O. F. Müller, 1774); Helix explanata O. F. Müller, 1774 (original combination); Xerosecta (Xerosecta) explanata (O. F. Müller, 1774) · alternate representation

= Xerosecta explanata =

Species of gastropod

Xerosecta explanata is a species of small air-breathing land snail, a terrestrial pulmonate gastropod mollusk in the family Geomitridae, the hairy snails and their allies.
