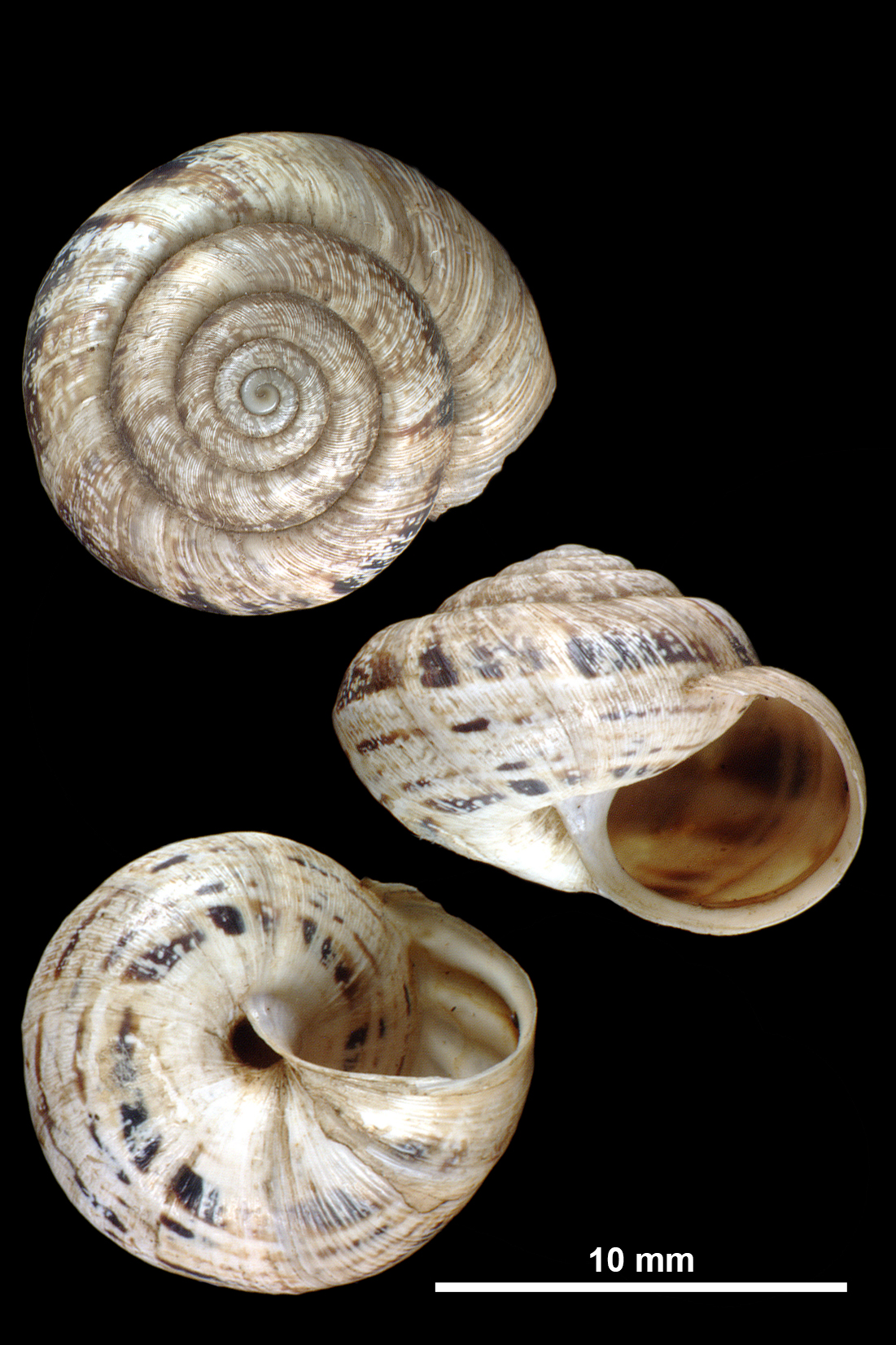
- Shell of Xerosecta terverii (specimen at MNHN, Paris)

Scientific classification
- Kingdom: Animalia
- Phylum: Mollusca
- Class: Gastropoda
- Order: Stylommatophora
- Family: Geomitridae
- Genus: Xerosecta
- Species: X. terverii

Binomial name
- Xerosecta terverii (Michaud, 1831)

Synonyms
- Helicella (Xeromagna) terverii (Michaud, 1831) · unaccepted > superseded combination; Helix (Xerophila) terveri Michaud, 1831 (superseded combination;...); Helix maristorum Florence, 1884 · unaccepted > junior subjective synonym; Helix terverii Michaud, 1831 (original combination); Xerosecta (Xeromagna) terverii (Michaud, 1831) · alternate representation

= Xerosecta terverii =

Species of gastropod

Xerosecta terverii is a species of small air-breathing land snail, a terrestrial pulmonate gastropod mollusk in the family Geomitridae, the hairy snails and their allies.

== Description ==
(Original description in Latin) The shell is orbicular-depressed, perforated, finely striated, shiny, and whitish or reddish, variously spotted or dotted with black or grey; it has five or six subplanar whorls, with the body whorl carinated at the periphery; the aperture is semi-lunar; the peristome is white inside, one- or two-margined, and subreflected; the apex is blackish.

== Distribution ==
This species occurs in southern France, Algeria and Tunisia.
