= Pendroma perplexa =

Scientific classification
- Kingdom: Animalia
- Phylum: Mollusca
- Class: Gastropoda
- Subclass: Vetigastropoda
- Family: Pendromidae
- Genus: Pendroma
- Species: P. perplexa

Binomial name
- Pendroma perplexa Dall, 1927

Species of gastropod

Pendroma perplexa is a species of sea snail, a marine gastropod mollusk in the family Pendromidae.

== Description ==
The small, whitish shell grows to a length of 3 mm. It has a subturbinate shape with four rapidly enlarging whorls. The minute protoconch is smooth. The whorls of the teleoconch show an axial sculpture. The numerous, sharp plicae on these whorls have an irregular pattern. These become obsolete beyond the periphery on the body whorl. The deep suture is not channeled. The aperture is subovate. The outer lip is sharp and flexuous, while the inner lip is thin and has a narrow umbilical chink behind it. This chink is continued by a shallow groove behind the inner lip.

== Distribution ==
This marine species occurs from St Kitts, West Indies to Argentina
