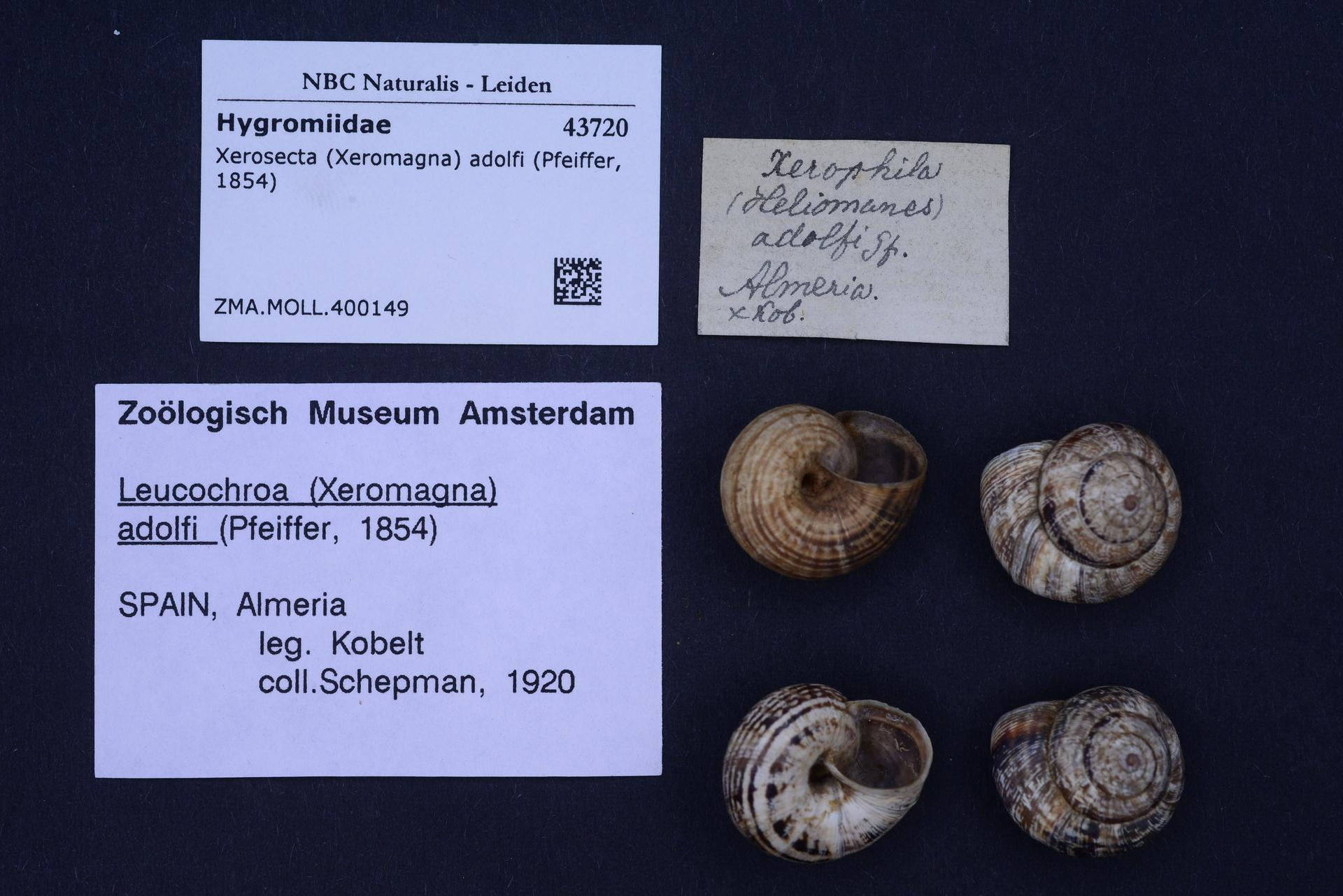
- Xerosecta adolfi shells

Conservation status
- Endangered (IUCN 3.1)

Scientific classification
- Kingdom: Animalia
- Phylum: Mollusca
- Class: Gastropoda
- Order: Stylommatophora
- Family: Geomitridae
- Genus: Xerosecta
- Species: X. adolfi

Binomial name
- Xerosecta adolfi Pfeiffer, 1854

Synonyms
- Helix adolfi L. Pfeiffer, 1854 · unaccepted (original combination); Xerosecta (Xeromagna) adolfi (L. Pfeiffer, 1854) · alternate representation

= Xerosecta adolfi =

Species of gastropod

Xerosecta adolfi is species of small air-breathing land snail, a terrestrial pulmonate gastropod mollusk in the family Geomitridae, the hairy snails and their allies.

This species is endemic to Spain.

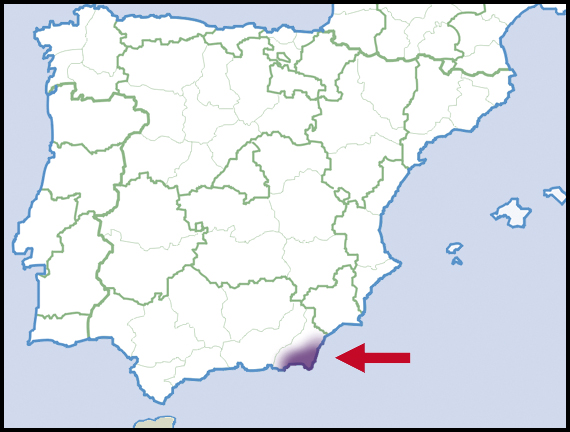
Distribution
