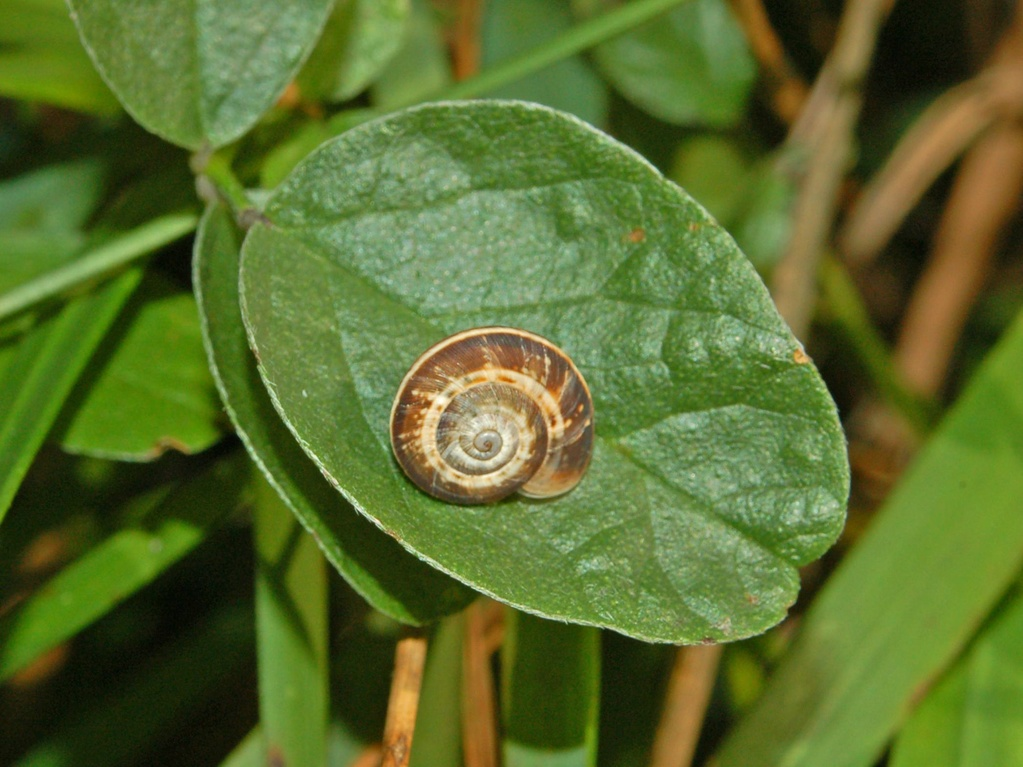
- A live but retracted individual of Xerosecta cespitum

Scientific classification
- Kingdom: Animalia
- Phylum: Mollusca
- Class: Gastropoda
- Order: Stylommatophora
- Family: Geomitridae
- Subfamily: Helicellinae
- Genus: Xerosecta; Monterosato, 1892

Type species
- Helix explanata O. F. Müller, 1774

Synonyms
- Cernuella (Xeromagna) Monterosato, 1892 · (superseded generic combination); Cernuella (Xerosecta) Monterosato, 1892 ·; Helicella (Xeromagna) Monterosato, 1892 ·; Helix (Jacosta) Gray, 1821 · (invalid: Placed on Index); Jacosta Gray, 1821 · (invalid: Placed on the Official...); Polloneria Alzona & Alzona Bisacchi, 1939 · (homonym: non Clausilia...); Polloneriella Alzona & Alzona Bisacchi, 1940 ·; Xerambigua Monterosato, 1892 ·; Xeromagna Monterosato, 1892 ·; Xeromoesta Monterosato, 1892 ·; Xerosecta (Polloneriella) Alzona & Alzona Bisacchi, 1940 · alternate representation; Xerosecta (Xeromagna) Monterosato, 1892 · alternate representation; Xerosecta (Xerosecta) Monterosato, 1892 · alternate representation

= Xerosecta =

Genus of gastropods

Xerosecta is a genus of small, air-breathing land snails, terrestrial pulmonate gastropod mollusks in the subfamily Helicellinae of the family Geomitridae, the hairy snails and their allies.

Snails in this genus create and use love darts as part of their mating behavior.

== Species ==
Species within the genus Xerosecta include:

- Xerosecta adolfi L. Pfeiffer, 1854)
- Xerosecta arigonis (A. Schmidt, 1853)
- Xerosecta brachyflagellata De Mattia & Mascia, 2014
- Xerosecta cespitum (Draparnaud, 1801)
- Xerosecta contermina (L. Pfeiffer, 1848)
- Xerosecta dohrni (Paulucci, 1882)
- Xerosecta explanata (O. F. Müller, 1774)
- Xerosecta giustii Manganelli & Favilli, 1996
- Xerosecta introducta (A. Villa & G. B. Villa, 1841)
- Xerosecta leptocolpata (P.M. Pallary, 1923)
- Xerosecta pharussica (P.M. Pallary, 1926)
- Xerosecta promissa (Westerlund, 1892)
- Xerosecta reboundiana (Bourguignat, 1863)
- Xerosecta sandaliotica De Mattia & Mascia, 2014
- Xerosecta terverii (Michaud, 1831)
- Xerosecta vaucheri (P.M. Pallary, 1901)

Synonyms

- Xerosecta gvozdevi Soboleva, Rymzhanov & Plachov, 1995: synonym of Kalitinaia gvozdevi (Soboleva, Rymzhanov & Plachov, 1995) (superseded combination, basionym)
- Xerosecta hillyeriana (M. Paulucci, 1882): synonym of Xerosecta dohrni (Paulucci, 1882)
- Xerosecta orientalis Uvalieva & Sacharnova, 1995: synonym of Kalitinaia orientalis (Uvalieva & Sacharnova, 1995) (original combination)
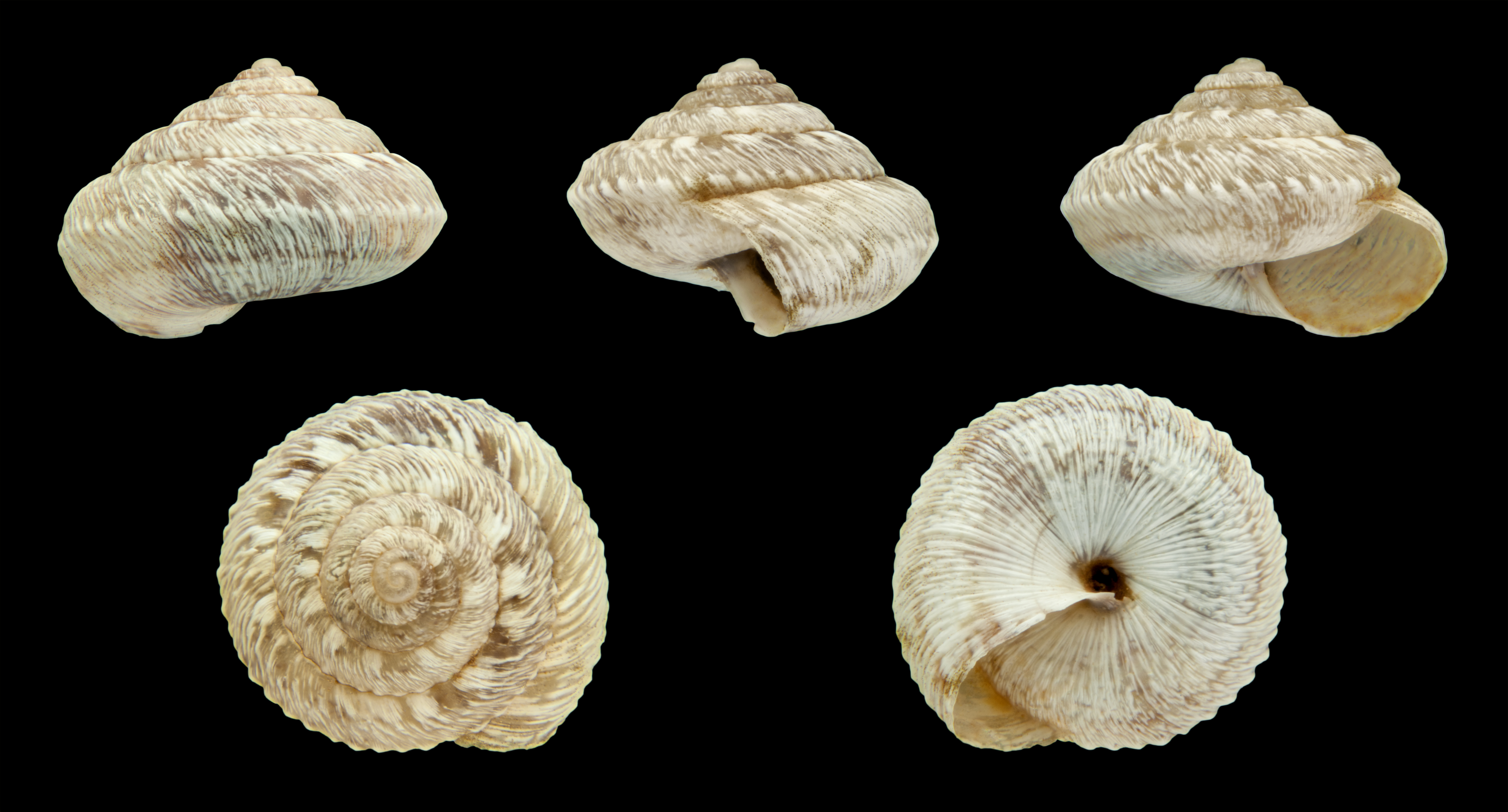
Xerosecta arnaizi

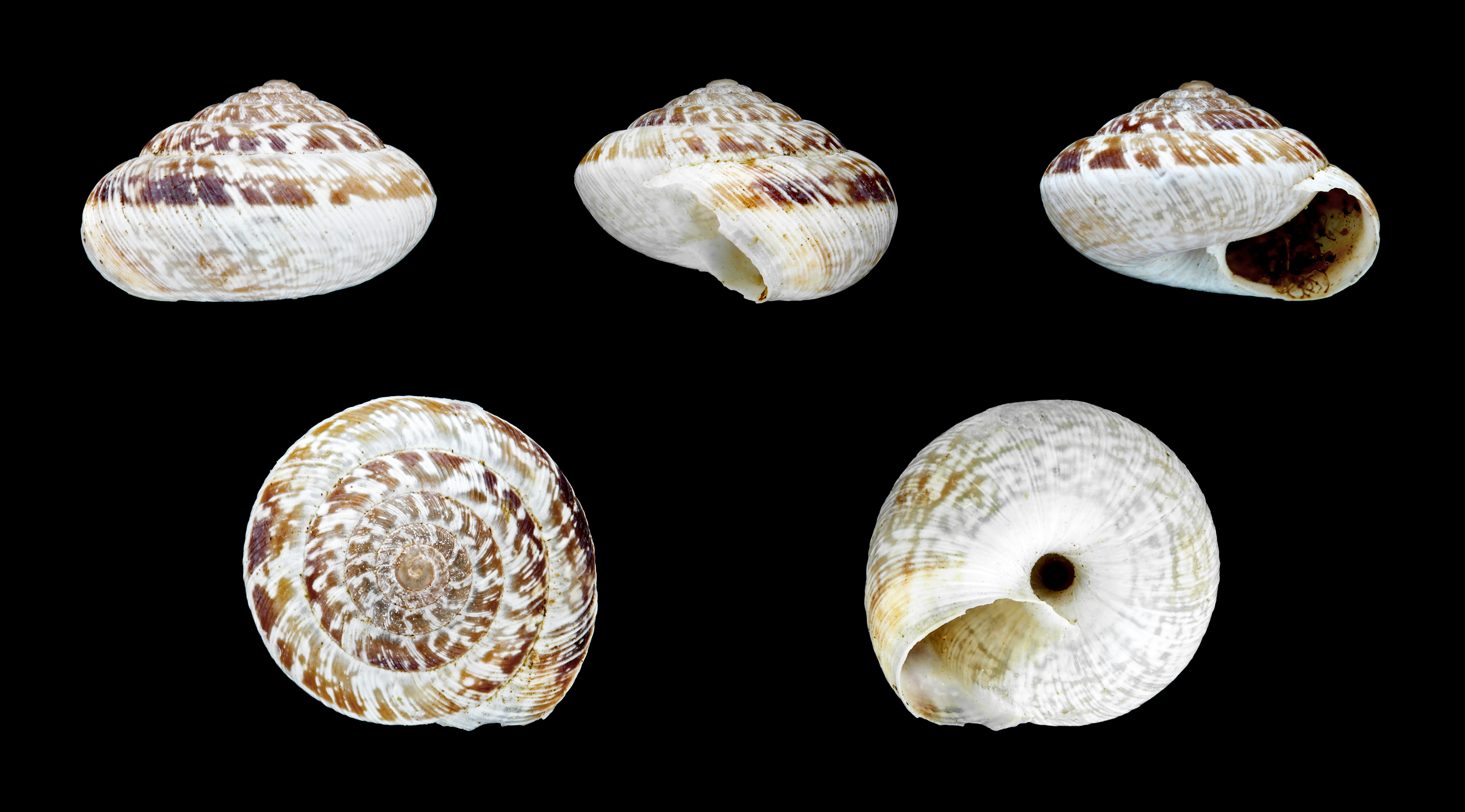
Xerosecta bodsonae

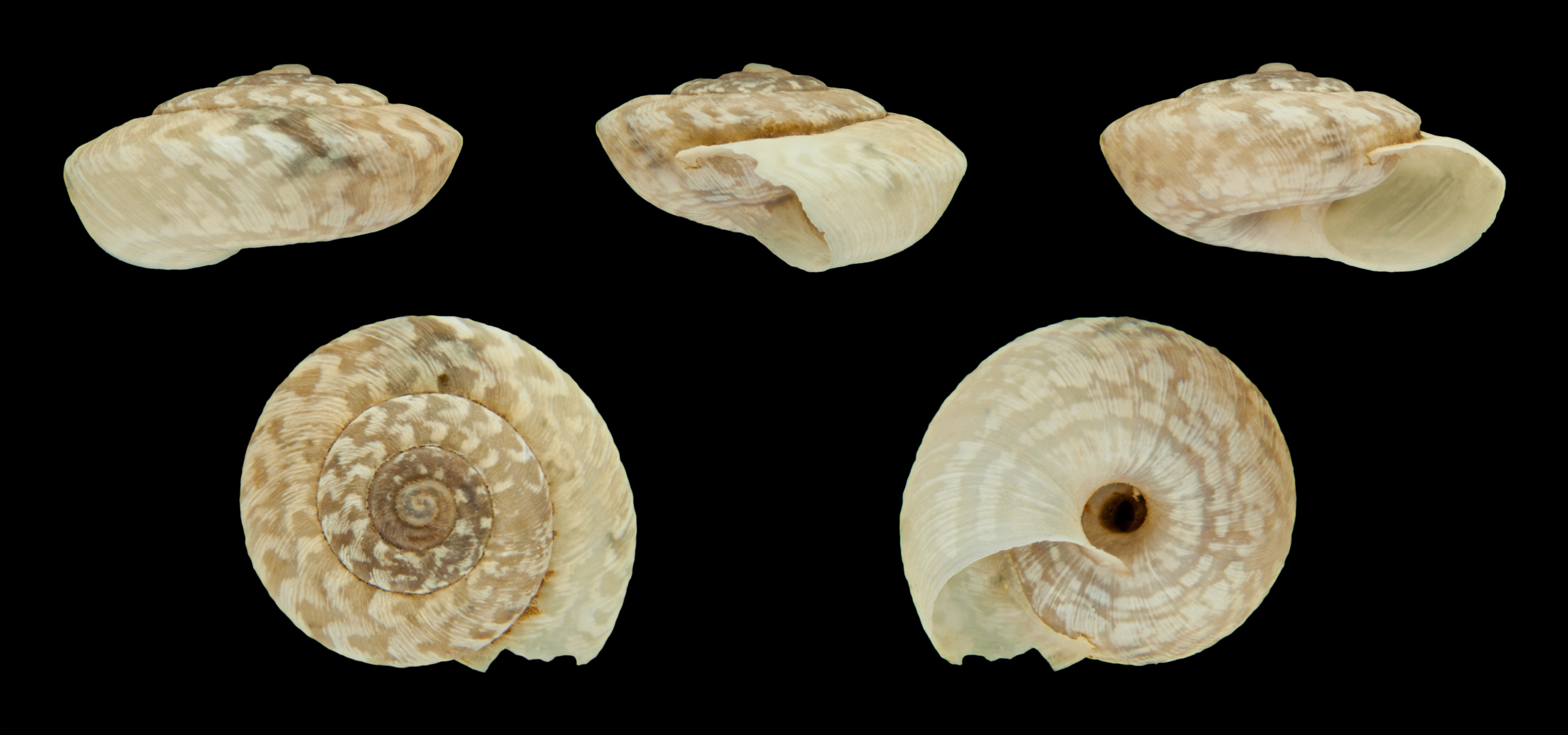
Xerosecta brunoti

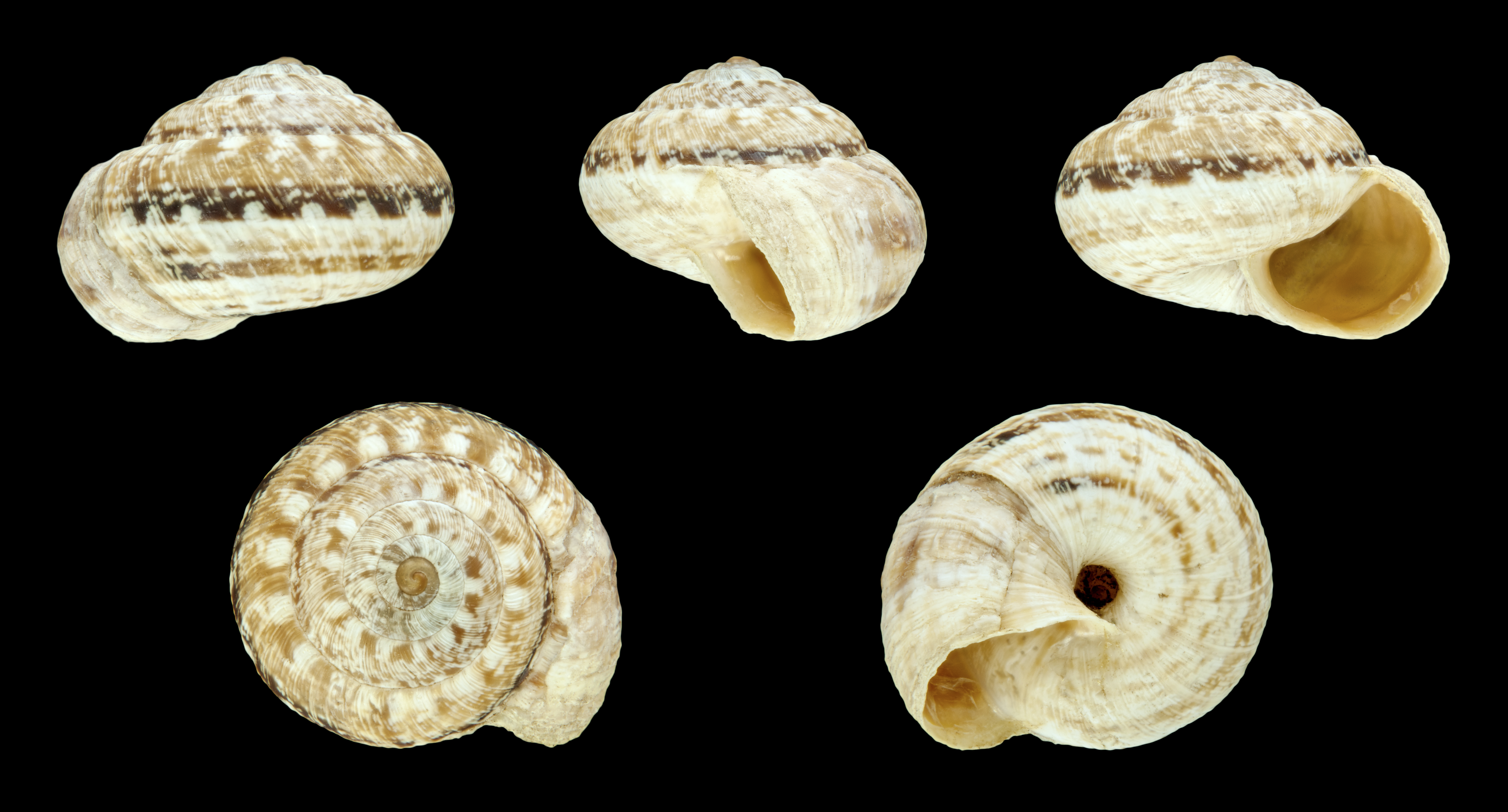
Xerosecta castriesi

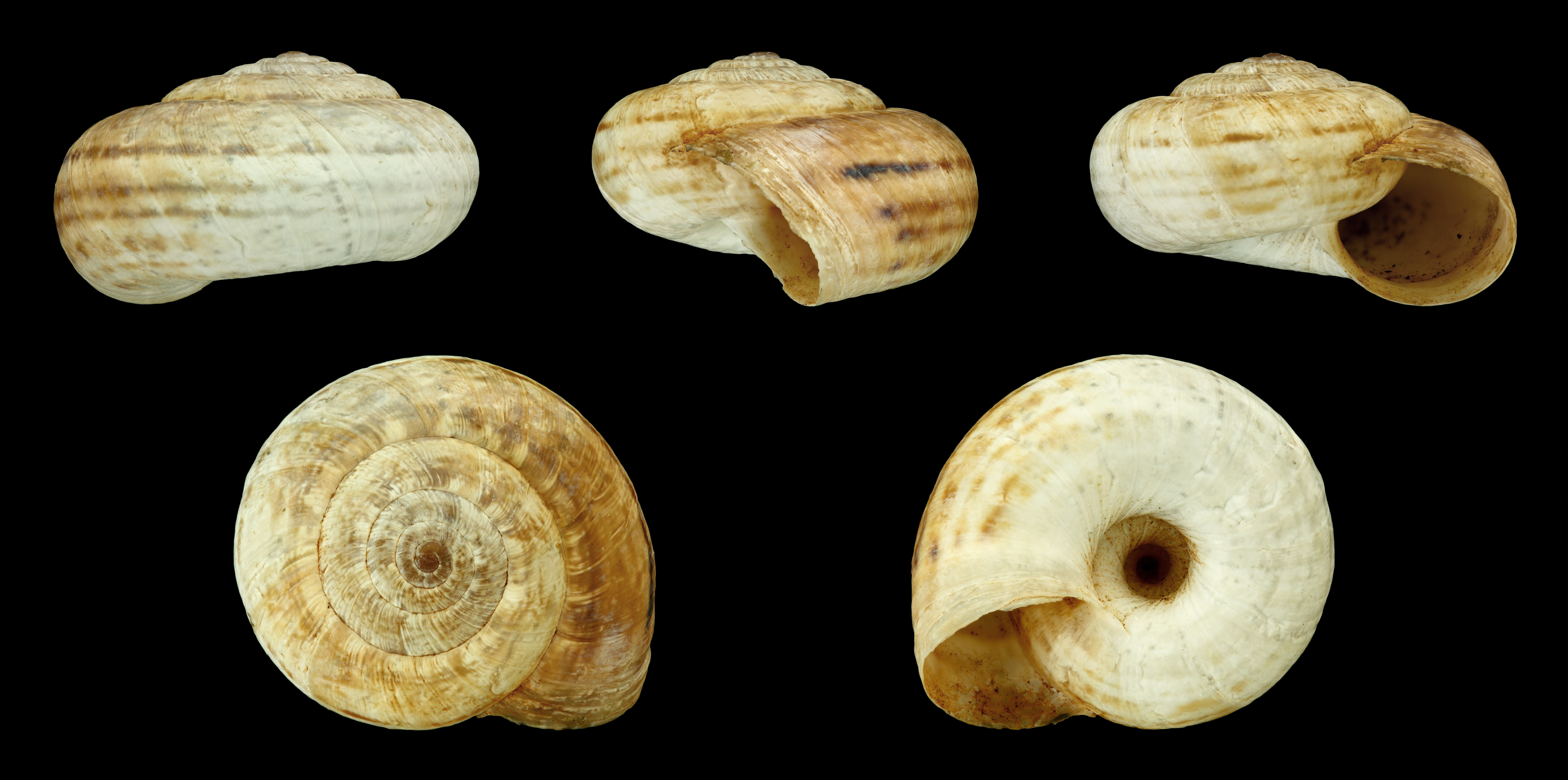
Xerosecta cespitum

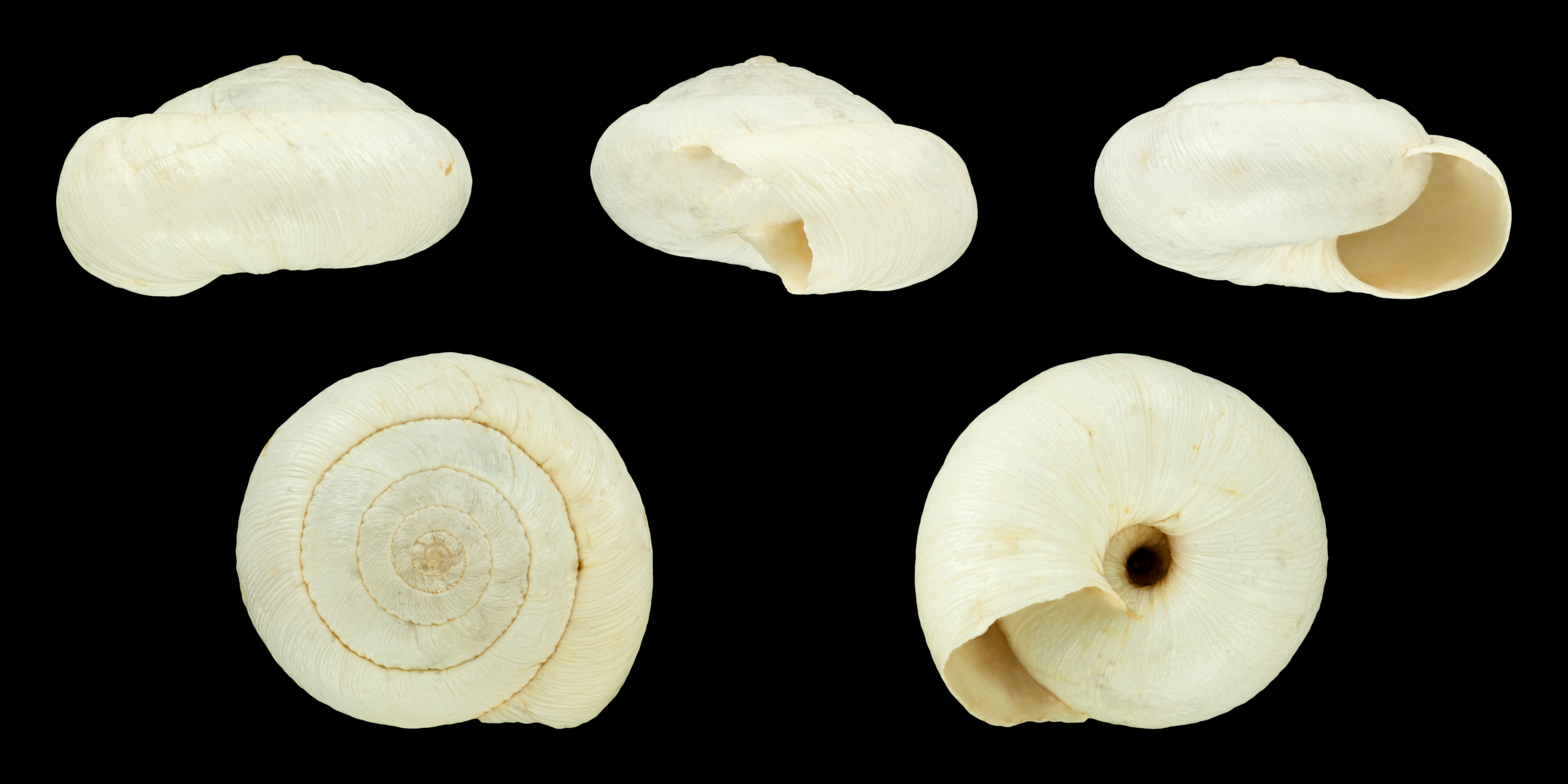
Xerosecta edrissiana

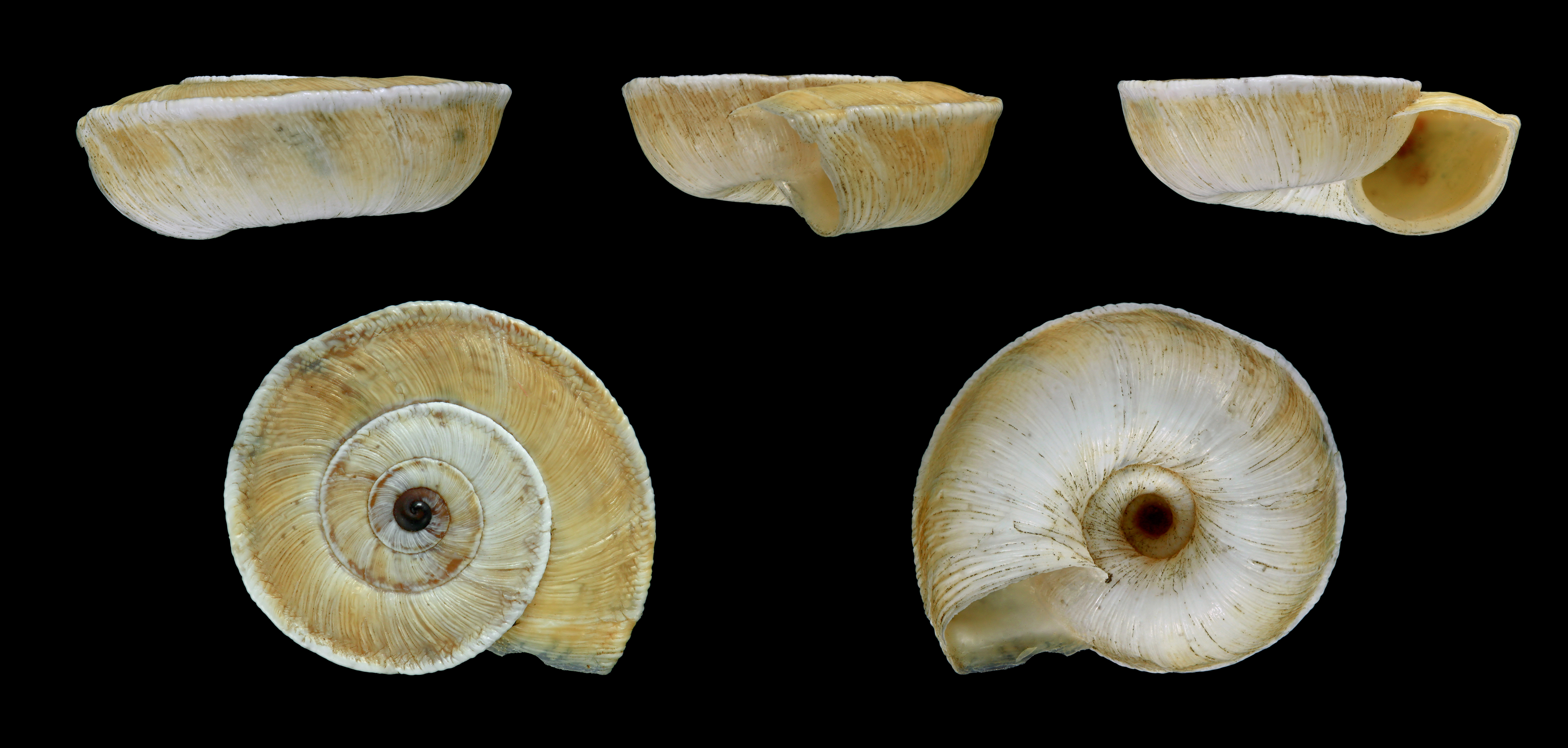
Xerosecta explanata

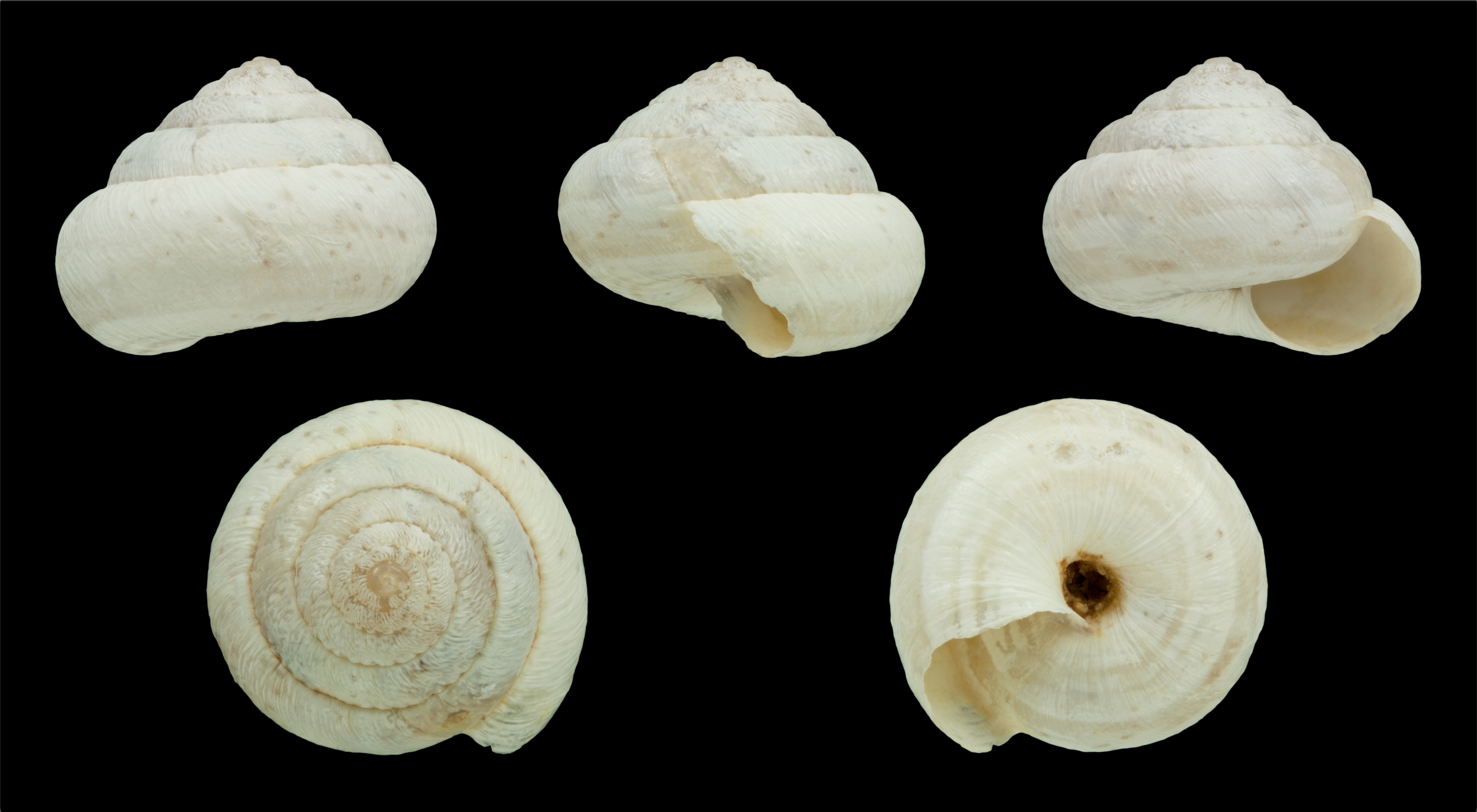
Xerosecta globuloidea

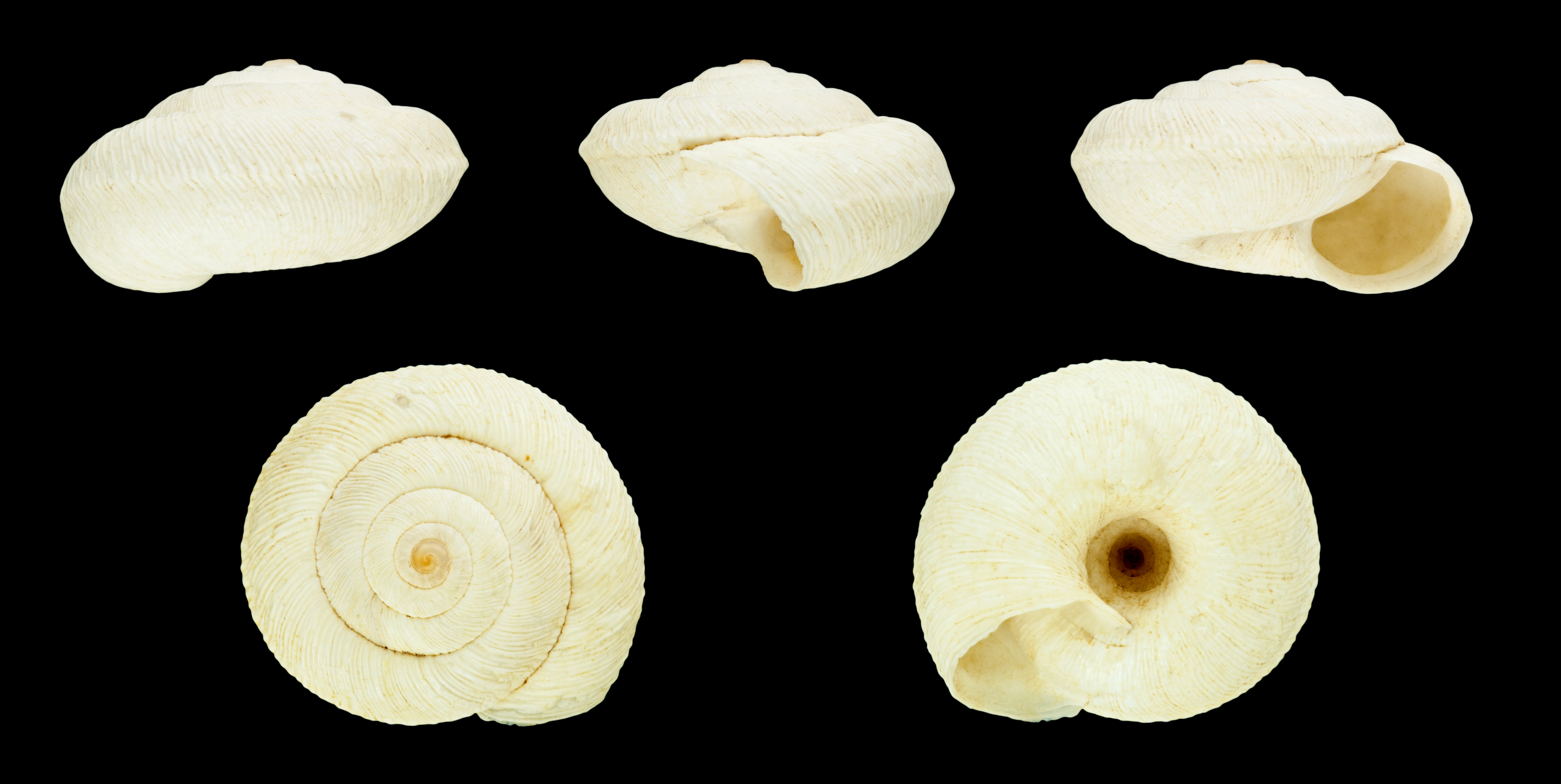
Xerosecta mogadorensis fusca

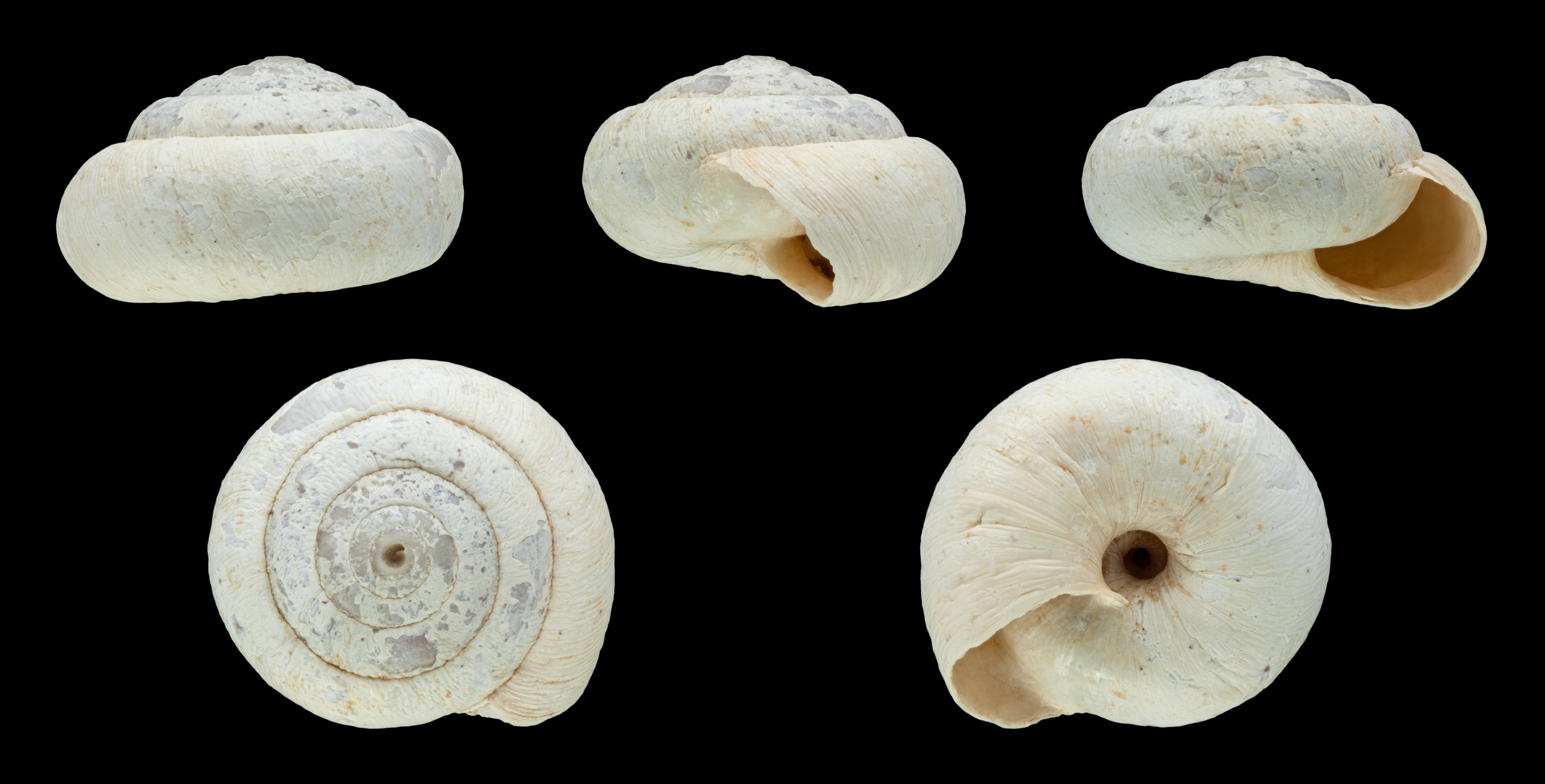
Xerosecta pharussica alba

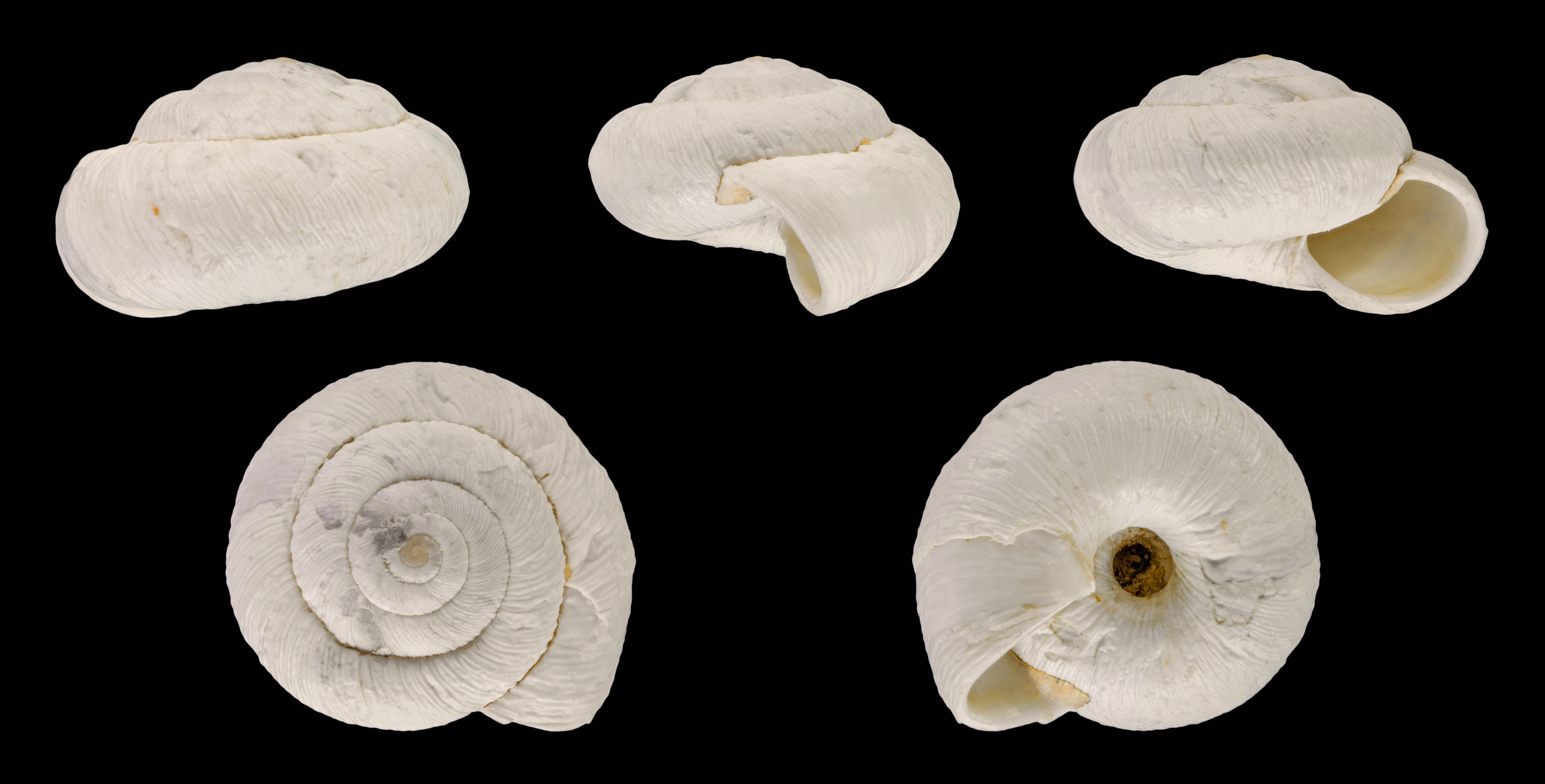
Xerosecta pharussica minor

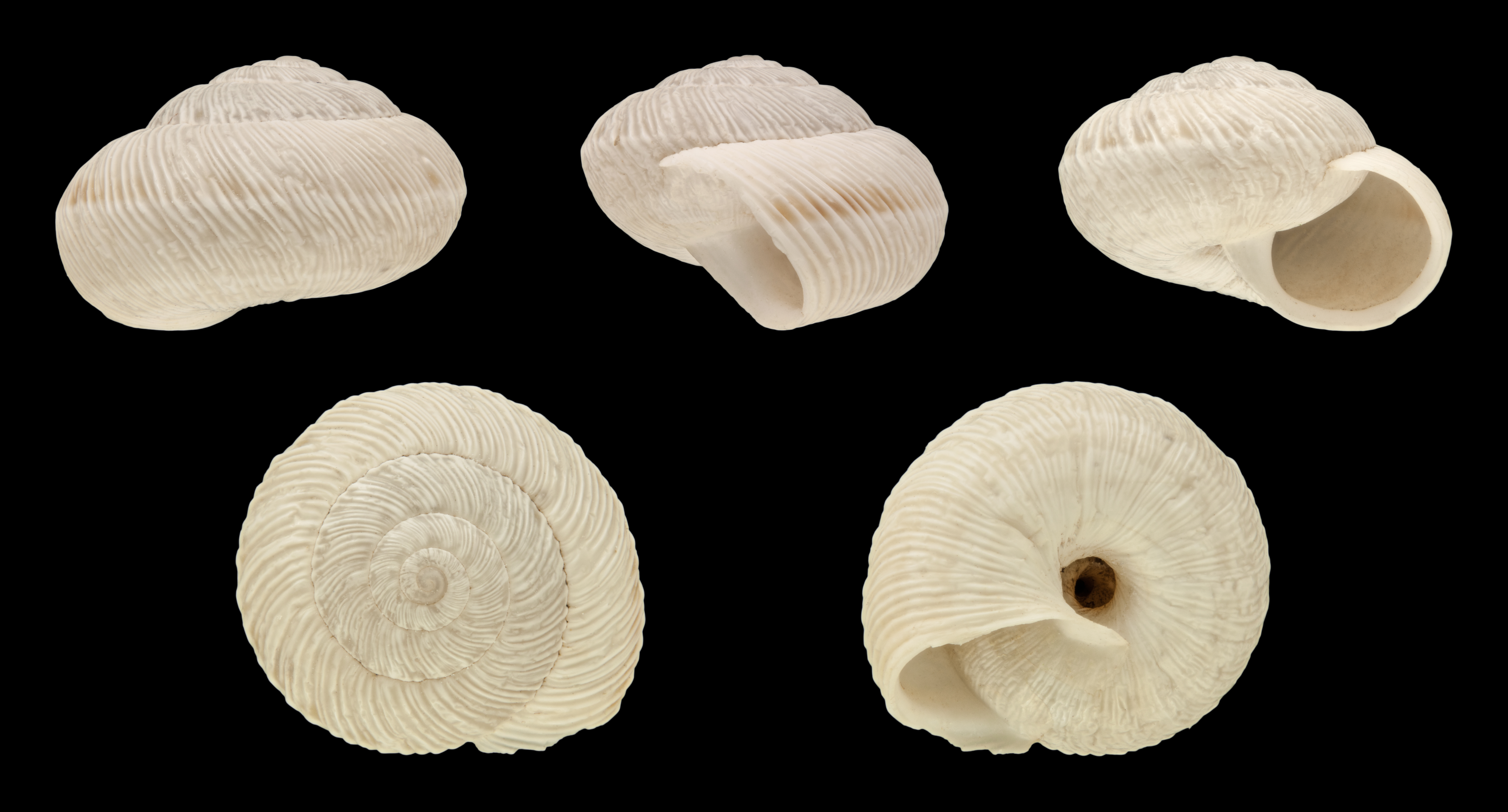
Xerosecta submoesta (white form)

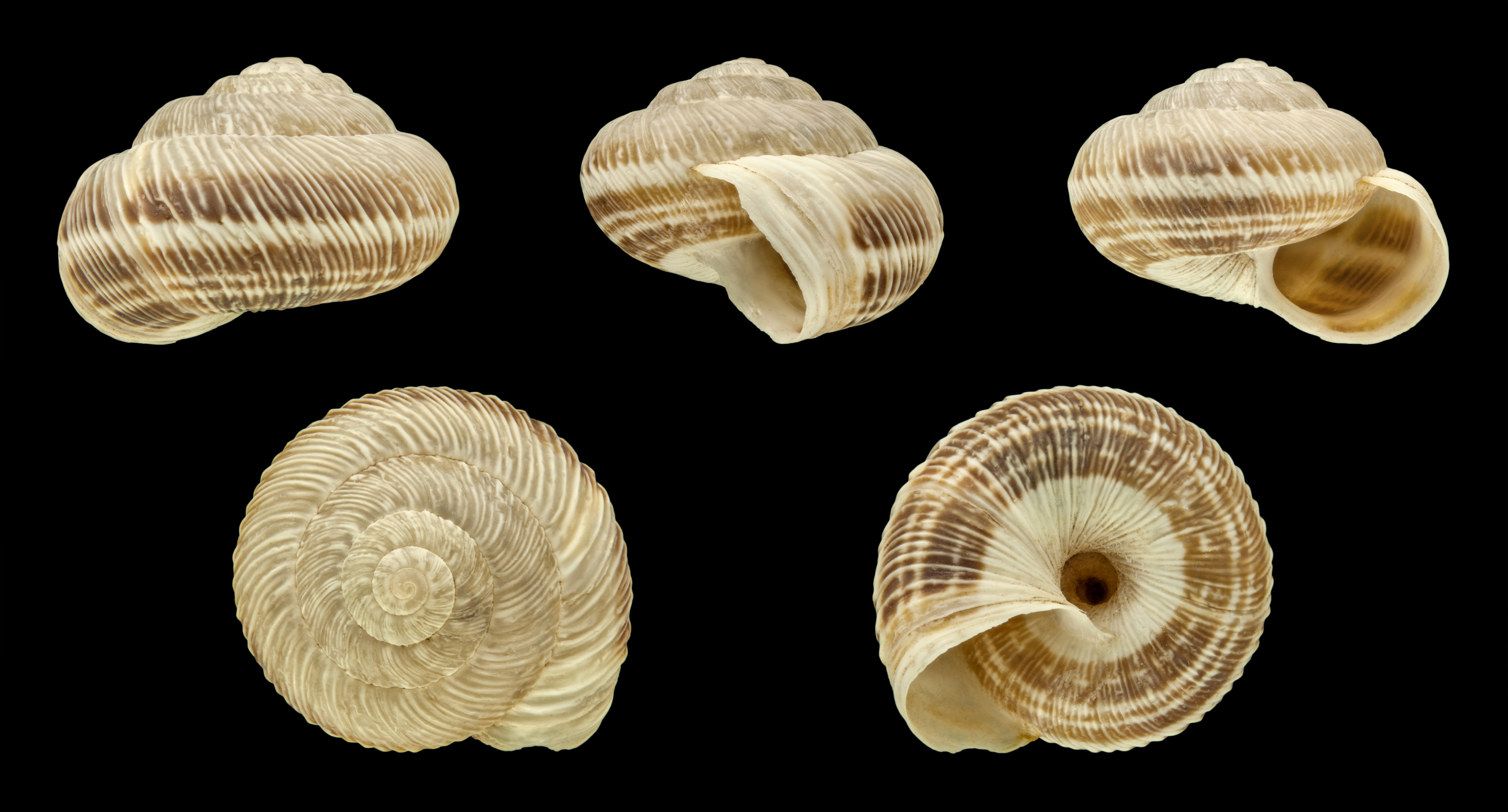
Xerosecta submoesta (banded form)

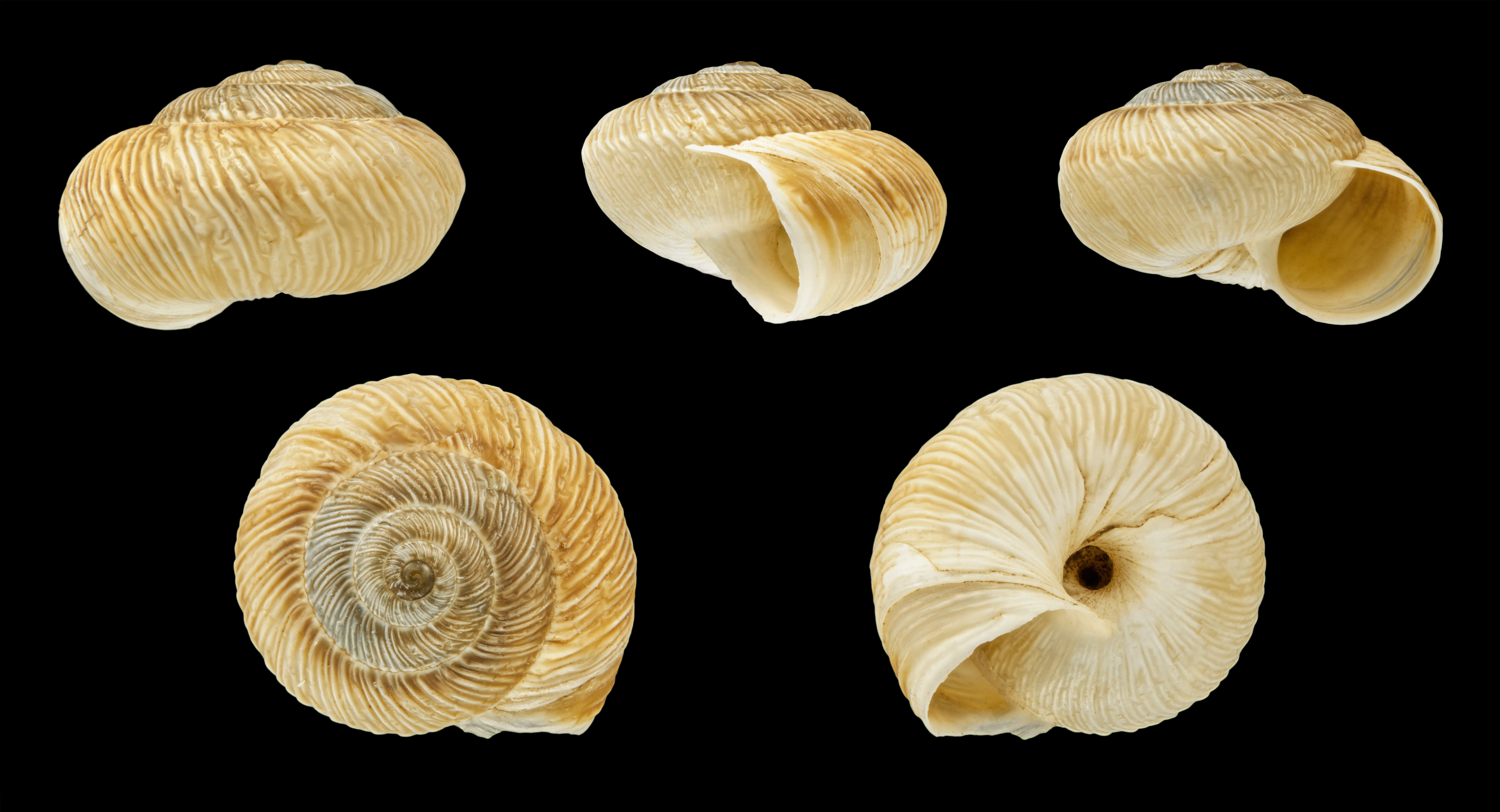
Xerosecta submoesta (brown form)

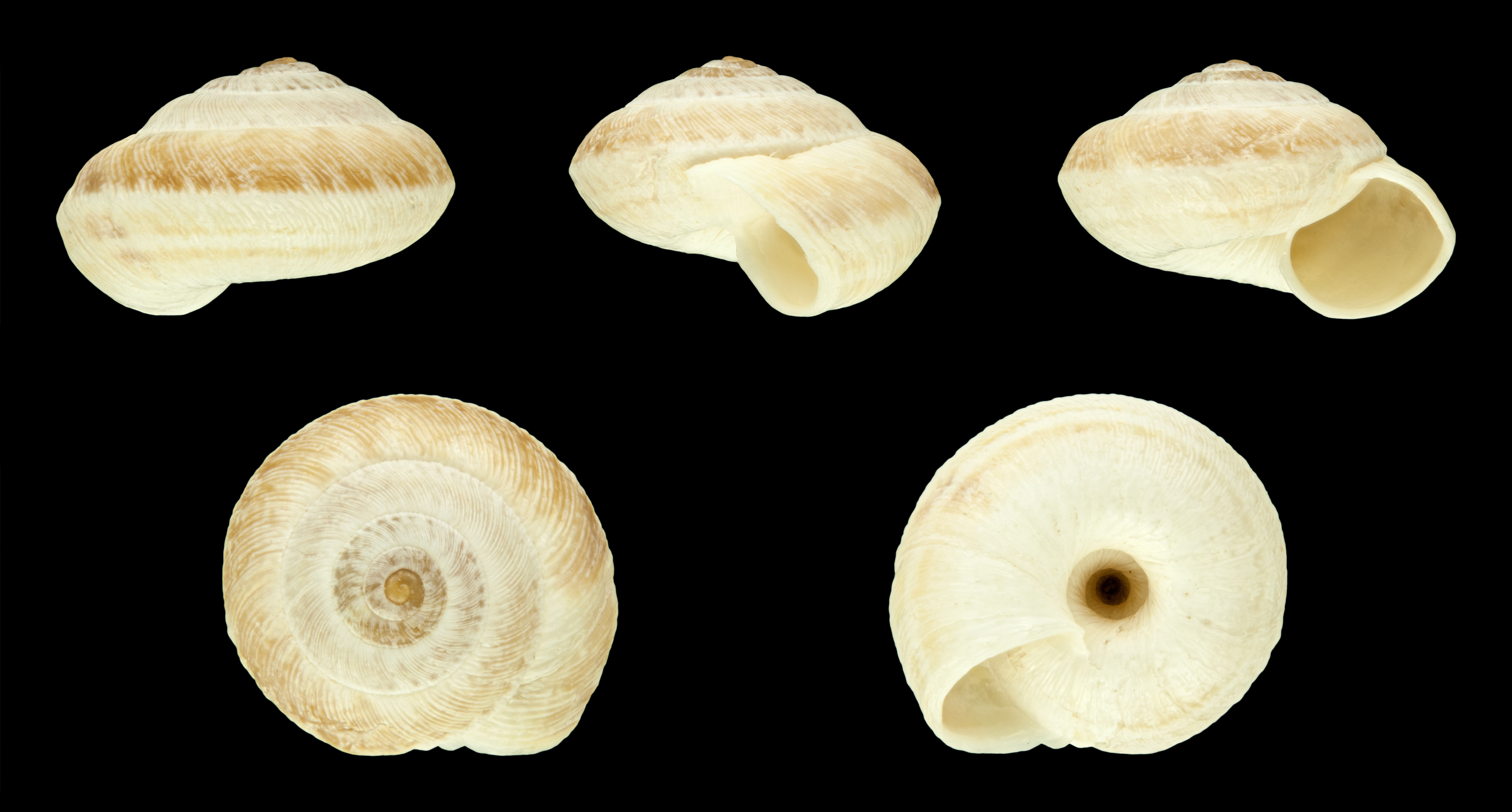
Xerosecta vaucheri
