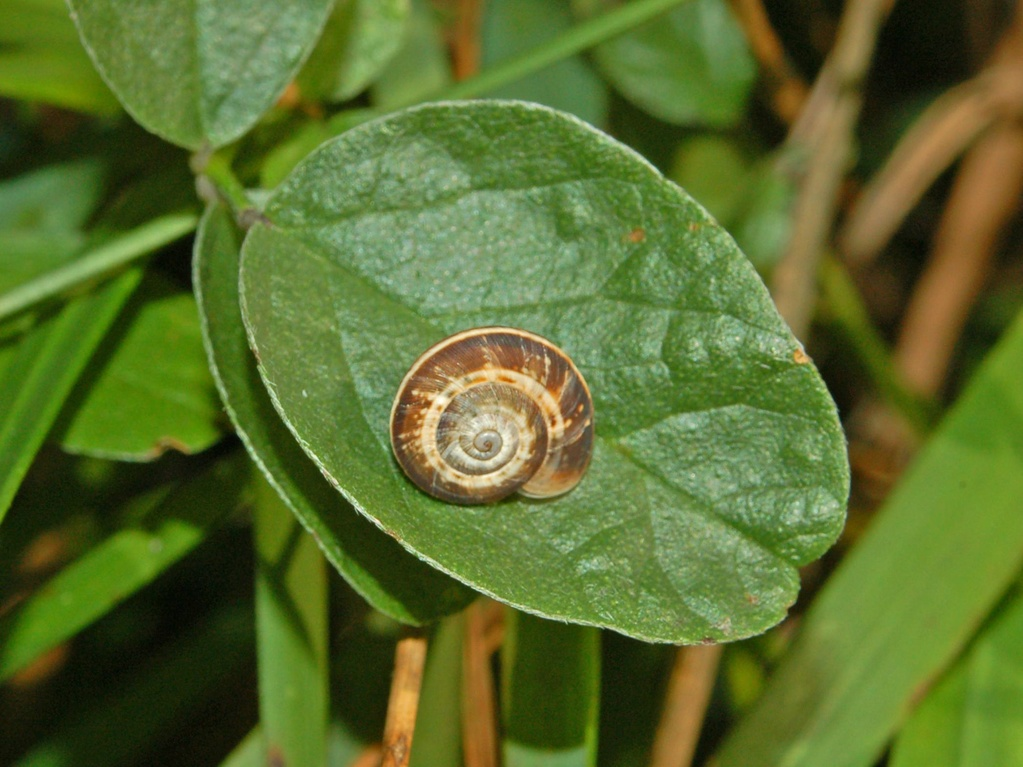
- A live but retracted individual of Xerosecta cespitum

Conservation status
- Least Concern (IUCN 3.1)

Scientific classification
- Kingdom: Animalia
- Phylum: Mollusca
- Class: Gastropoda
- Order: Stylommatophora
- Family: Geomitridae
- Genus: Xerosecta
- Species: X. cespitum

Binomial name
- Xerosecta cespitum (Draparnaud, 1801)

Synonyms
- Cernuella (Xeromagna) cespitum (Draparnaud, 1801); Helix (Xerophila) cespitum Draparnaud, 1801 (superseded combination); Helix cespitum Draparnaud, 1801 (original combination); Helix coespitum A. Villa & G. B. Villa, 1841 (invalid; incorrect subsequent spelling); Xerosecta (Xeromagna) cespitum (Draparnaud, 1801) · alternate representation

= Xerosecta cespitum =

Species of gastropod

Xerosecta cespitum is a species of small air-breathing land snail, a terrestrial pulmonate gastropod mollusk in the family Geomitridae, the hairy snails and their allies.

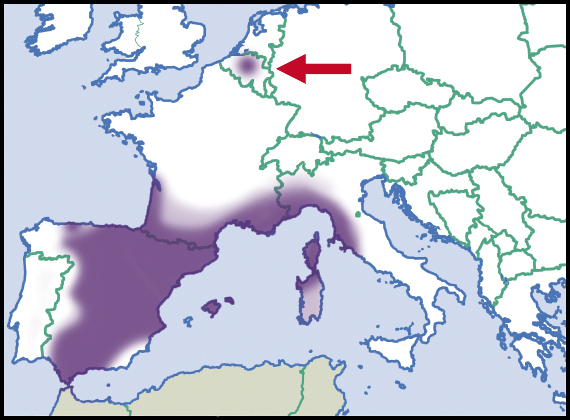
Distribution

This snail is native to south Spain, Mallorca, southern France, northwestern Italy, Corsica, Sardinia, Elba, and Morocco to Tunisia.

This species of snail makes and uses love darts as part of mating behavior.

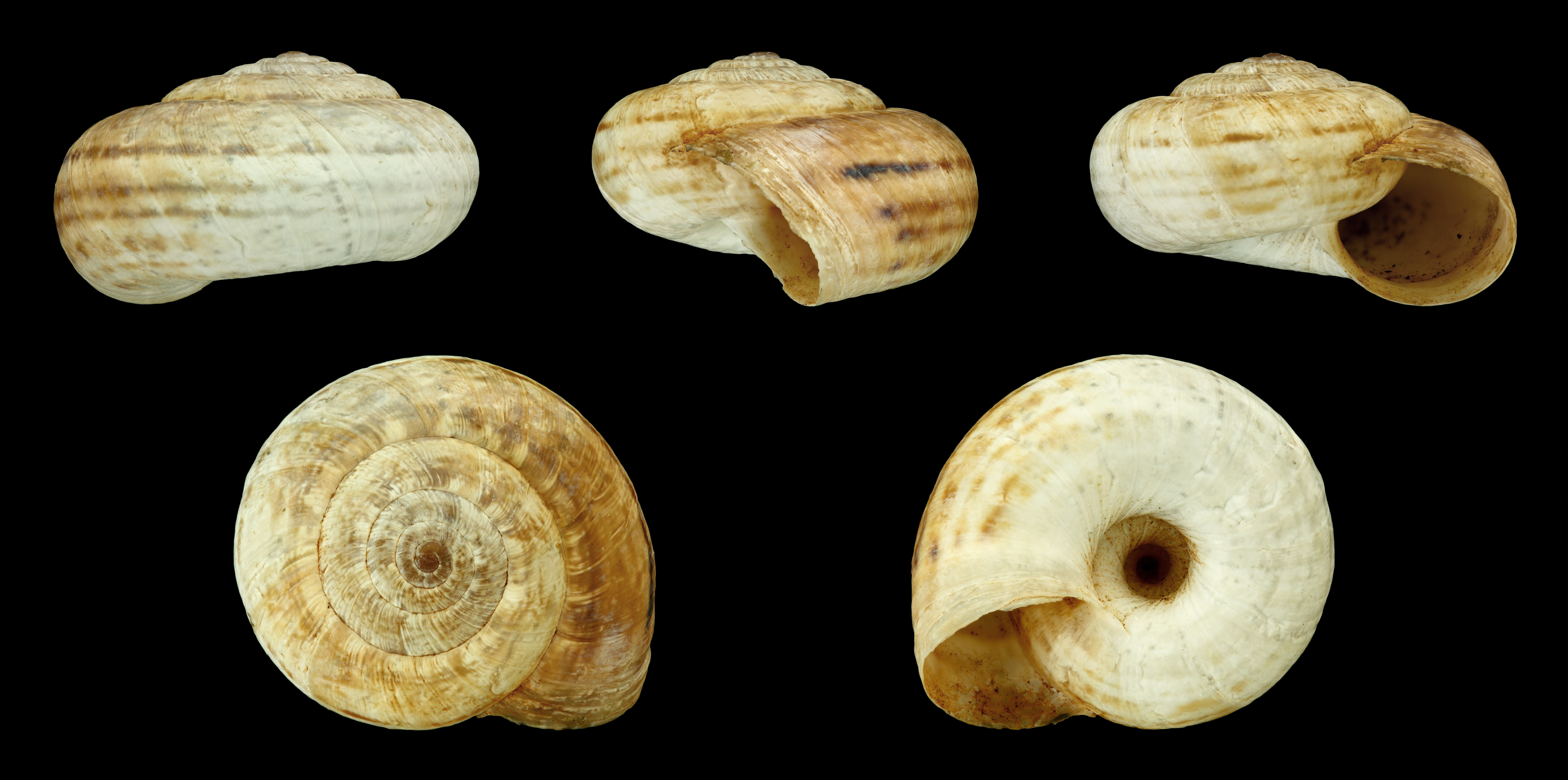
Five views of a shell of Xerosecta cespitum
