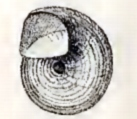
- View of a shell of Rugulina verrilli

Scientific classification
- Kingdom: Animalia
- Phylum: Mollusca
- Class: Gastropoda
- Subclass: Vetigastropoda
- Family: Pendromidae
- Genus: Rugulina; Palazzi, 1988

Type species
- Daronia monterosatoi van Aartsen & Bogi, 1986

= Rugulina =

Genus of gastropods

Rugulina is a genus of sea snails, marine gastropod molluscs in the family Pendromidae.

== Distribution ==
These species has a bipolar distribution. They occur in the cold waters of the Western Atlantic and two species off Antarctica.

== Species ==
Species within the genus Rugulina include:

- Rugulina antarctica (Numanami, 1996)
- Rugulina fragilis (Sars, 1878)
- Rugulina ignobilis (Thiele, 1912)
- Rugulina monterosatoi (van Aartsen & Bogi, 1986)
- Rugulina tenuis (Thiele, 1912)
- Rugulina verrilli (Tryon, 1888)
