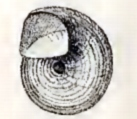
- View of a shell of Rugulina verrilli

Scientific classification
- Kingdom: Animalia
- Phylum: Mollusca
- Class: Gastropoda
- Subclass: Vetigastropoda
- Family: Pendromidae
- Genus: Rugulina
- Species: R. verrilli

Binomial name
- Rugulina verrilli (Tryon, 1888)

Synonyms
- Cyclostrema verrilli Tryon, 1888 (original combination)

= Rugulina verrilli =

Species of gastropod

Rugulina verrilli is a species of sea snail, a marine gastropod mollusk in the family Pendromidae.

== Description ==
The white shell grows to a length of 2.2 mm. It is widely umbilicated and depressed, with a low spire. it is finely, longitudinally, obliquely striate, with several spiral lines on the body whorl above the periphery. These become more numerous and closer on the base. The spire consists of 3½ whorls with the last one large and very convex. The base of the shell is oblique. The large aperture is very obliquely ovate. The periphery is thin and sharp.

== Distribution ==
This marine species occurs in the colder waters off eastern USA.
