= Pendroma =

Scientific classification
- Kingdom: Animalia
- Phylum: Mollusca
- Class: Gastropoda
- Subclass: Vetigastropoda
- Family: Pendromidae
- Genus: Pendroma; Dall, 1927

Genus of gastropods

Pendroma is a genus of sea snails, marine gastropod mollusks in the family Pendromidae.

== Species ==
Species within the genus Pendroma include:

- Pendroma perplexa Dall, 1927
