= Federigo Luigi Appelius =

Italian conchologist

Federigo Luigi Appelius (1835-20 April 1876, Livorno) was an Italian conchologist. His mother was Italian and his father was a German speaking Swiss so he was bilingual. He published : Le Conchiglie del Mar Tirreno, parte prima (pp. 1–27), parte seconda (pp. 1–49). Pisa, Tipografia Nistri (1869); Catalogo delle conchiglie fossili del Livornese desunto dalle collezioni e manoscritti del defunto G. B. Caterini. Bulletino Malacologico Italiano, Pisa, vol. III (1871); Osservazioni bibliografiche sui molluschi del Mar Rosso. Bullettino Malacologico Italiano, 6: 12-24 (1873) and short papers.
