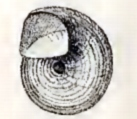
- Rugulina verrilli shell

Scientific classification
- Kingdom: Animalia
- Phylum: Mollusca
- Class: Gastropoda
- Subclass: Vetigastropoda
- Family: Pendromidae; Warén, 1991

Synonyms
- Trachysmatidae Thiele, 1925 (It was based on an identification error of the genus.)

= Pendromidae =

Family of gastropods

Pendromidae is a family of gastropods in the clade Vetigastropoda (according to the taxonomy of the Gastropoda by Bouchet & Rocroi, 2005).

This family is unassigned to superfamily. This family has no subfamilies.

== Genera ==
Genera in the family Pendromidae include:

- Pendroma Dall, 1927 - type genus of the family Pendromidae
  - Pendroma perplexa Dall, 1927
- Rugulina Palazzi, 1988
- Trachysma Jeffreys, 1874
