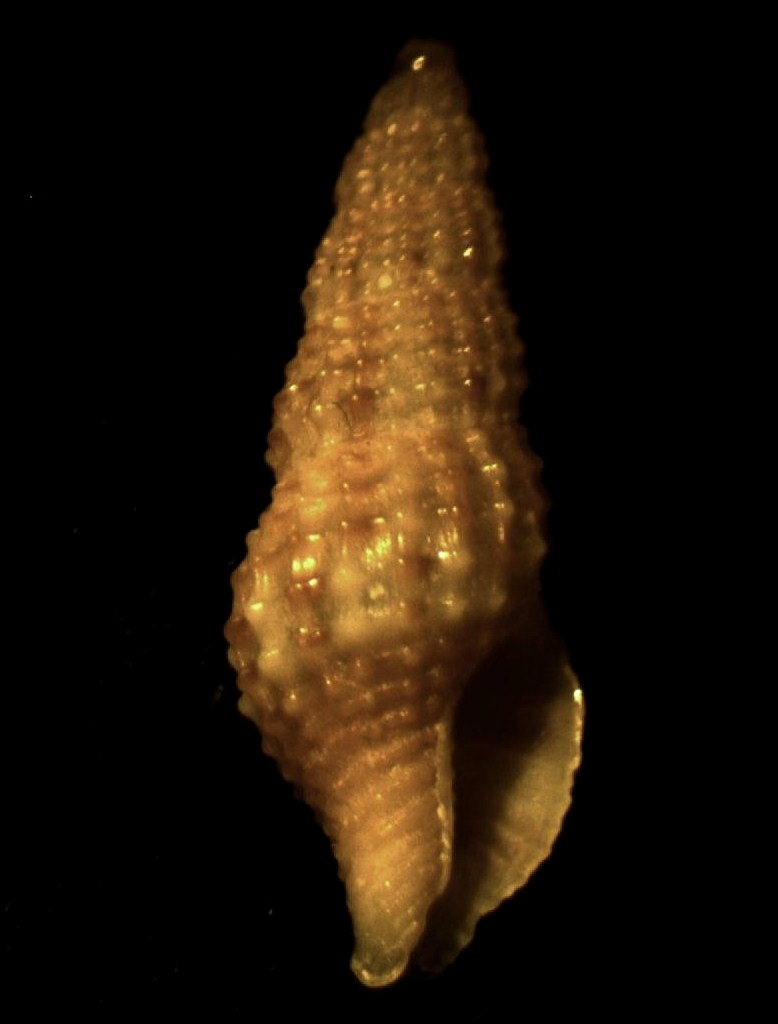
- Nassarina perata

Scientific classification
- Kingdom: Animalia
- Phylum: Mollusca
- Class: Gastropoda
- Subclass: Caenogastropoda
- Order: Neogastropoda
- Superfamily: Buccinoidea
- Family: Columbellidae
- Genus: Nassarina; Dall, 1889

Type species
- Nassaria bushii Dall, 1889

Synonyms
- Nassaria (Nassarina) Dall, 1889 (original rank)

= Nassarina =

Genus of gastropods

Nassarina is a genus of sea snails, marine gastropod molluscs in the family Columbellidae, the dove snails.

== Species ==
Species within the genus Nassarina include:

- Nassarina adamsi (Tryon, 1883)
- Nassarina anitae G. B. Campbell, 1961
- Nassarina atella H. A. Pilsbry & Lowe, 1932
- Nassarina bushiae (Dall, 1889)
- Nassarina cruentata (Mörch, 1860)
- Nassarina glypta (Bush, 1885)
- Nassarina helenae A. M. Keen, 1971
- Nassarina metabrunnea Dall & Simpson, 1901
- Nassarina pammicra H. A. Pilsbry & Lowe, 1932
- Nassarina perata A. M. Keen, 1971
- Nassarina procera Pelorce & Boyer, 2005
- † Nassarina proctorae M. Smith, 1936
- Nassarina prouzetae Pelorce, 2020
- Nassarina rietae Segers & Swinnen, 2004
- Nassarina rolani Pelorce & Boyer, 2005
- Nassarina tehuantepecensis Shasky, 1970
- Nassarina thetys Costa & Absalao, 1998
- Nassarina vespera A. M. Keen, 1971
- Nassarina whitei P. Bartsch, 1928

The Global Names Index mentions also the following species

- Nassarina piperata E. A. Smith, 1882
- Nassarina sparsipunctata Rehder, 1943
- Nassarina tincta P. P. Carpenter, 1864

Species brought into synonymy

- Nassarina columbellata (Dall, 1889): synonym of Metulella columbellata (Dall, 1889)
- Nassarina conspicua C. B. Adams, 1852: synonym of Zanassarina conspicua (C. B. Adams, 1852)
- Nassarina dalli Olsson & Harbison, 1953: synonym of Nassarina glypta (Bush, 1885)
- Nassarina dubia Olsson & McGinty, 1958: synonym of Redfernella dubia (Olsson & McGinty, 1958) (original combination)
- Nassarina grayi W. H. Dall, 1889 : synonym of Cytharomorula grayi (Dall, 1889)
- Nassarina hancocki J. G. Hertlein & A. M. Strong, 1939: synonym of Steironepion hancocki (Hertlein & A. M. Strong, 1939) (original combination)
- Nassarina maculata (C. B. Adams, 1850): synonym of Steironepion maculatum (C. B. Adams, 1850)
- Nassarina melanosticta H. A. Pilsbry & Lowe, 1932: synonym of Steironepion piperatum (E. A. Smith, 1882)
- Nassarina minor C. B. Adams, 1845: synonym of Steironepion minus (C. B. Adams, 1845)
- Nassarina monilifera G.B. Sowerby I, 1844 : synonym of Steironepion moniliferum (G.B. Sowerby I, 1844)
- Nassarina penicillata (Carpenter, 1864): synonym of Zanassarina penicillata (Carpenter, 1864)
- Nassarina poecila H. A. Pilsbry & Lowe, 1932: synonym of Zanassarina poecila (Pilsbry & H. N. Lowe, 1932)
- Nassarina pygmaea (Adams, 1850): synonym of Steironepion pygmaeum (C. B. Adams, 1850)
- Nassarina xeno Pilsbry & H. N. Lowe, 1932: synonym of Nassarina cruentata (Mörch, 1860)
