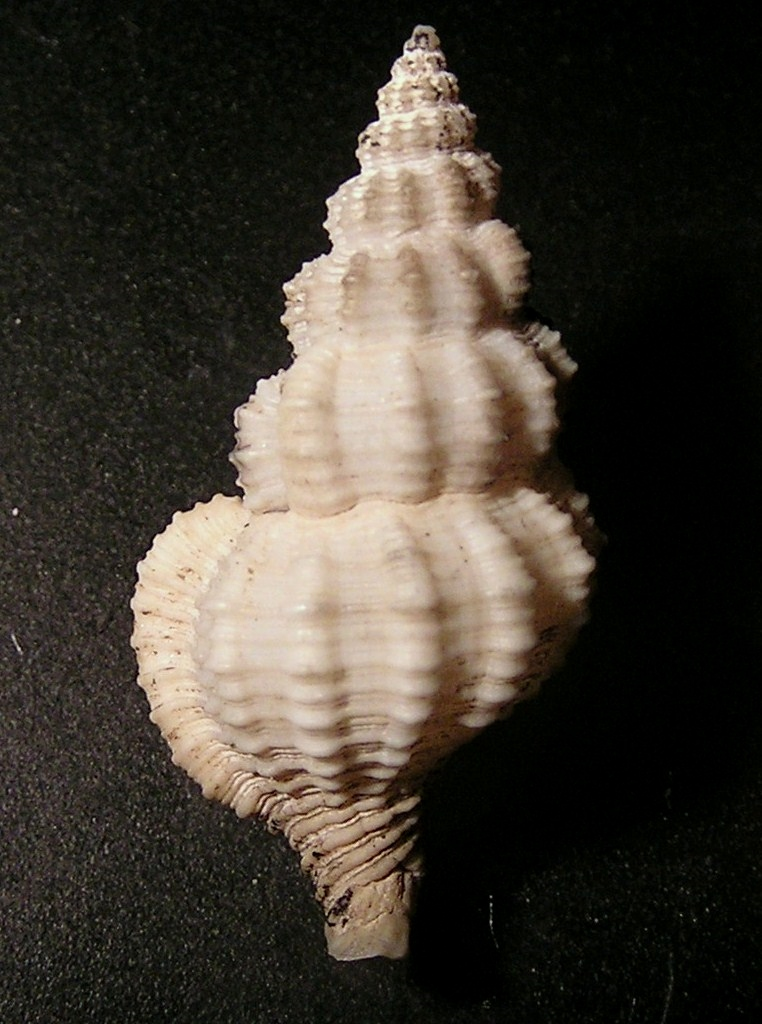
- Nassaria exquisita shell

Scientific classification
- Kingdom: Animalia
- Phylum: Mollusca
- Class: Gastropoda
- Subclass: Caenogastropoda
- Order: Neogastropoda
- Superfamily: Buccinoidea
- Family: Nassariidae
- Genus: Nassaria; Link, 1807

Type species
- Nassaria lyrata Link, 1807

Synonyms
- Benthindsia Iredale, 1936; Hindsia A. Adams, 1855; † Hindsia (Nihonophos) MacNeil, 1961; Microfusus Dall, 1916; Nassaria (Microfusus) Dall, 1916; Plicifusus (Microfusus) Dall, 1916

= Nassaria =

Genus of gastropods

Nassaria is a genus of sea snails, marine gastropod molluscs in the subfamily Tomliniinae of the family Nassariidae.

== Taxonomy ==
This genus was treated within family Buccinidae. It was moved to family Nassariidae in 2016.

== Type species ==
The issue regarding type species of the genus Nassaria Link, 1807 is confusing. Cernohorsky (1981) and Fraussen (2006) assume “Nassaria lyrata Link, 1807”. Considering other instances in Link (1807), this latter name is expected to represent a new combination for Buccinum lyratum Gmelin, 1791, not as a separately available new taxon. Link’s (1807) original reference reads “N. lyrata. L. G. p. 3494. M.C. 4, t. 122, f. 1122, 1123“ [”L.G.” stands for Linnaeus, Gmelin edition and M.C. For Martini & Chemnitz’s “Conchylien Cabinet”].

Nevertheless, as pointed out by Mörch (1862), MacNeil (1961), and others, the two cited references are inconsistent. Gmelin’s Buccinum lyratum is introduced on pp. 3494–3495, and currently considered as a synonym of Boreotrophon clathratus (Linnaeus, 1767) whereas the reference to Martini & Chemnitz (1780), vol. 4, t. 122, f. 1122, 1123 matches Buccinum album Gmelin, 1791, described on page 3495 with reference to the same figures. The vernacular name “Fischreuseschnecken” (a German translation of Nassa snails) used by Link matches “Fischreuse” used by Martini & Chemnitz for f. 1122, 1123, indicating that the latter was the species really intended. This is the rationale for the current interpretation, where Nassaria lyrata Link, 1807 is considered an available name based on Martini & Chemnitz f. 1122, 1123 and objective junior synonym of Buccinum album Gmelin, 1791.

== Description ==
The shell is ovately fusiform. The spire is acuminated. The whorls are longitudinally ribbed and cancellated. The aperture ends anteriorly in a long recurved siphonal canal. The inner lip is thin, circumscribed and transversely corrugately plicated. The outer lip is grooved internally.

== Species ==
Species within the genus Nassaria include:

- Nassaria acuminata (Reeve, 1881)
- Nassaria acutispirata (G.B. Sowerby III, 1913)
- Nassaria amboynensis Watson, 1881
- Nassaria bitubercularis(A. Adams, 1851)
- Nassaria bombax Cernohorsky, 1981
- Nassaria callomoni Poppe, Tagaro & Fraussen, 2008
- Nassaria corollaria Fraussen, 2006
- Nassaria coromandelica E.A.Smith, 1894
- † Nassaria dijki (K. Martin, 1884)
- Nassaria exquisita Fraussen & Poppe, 2007
- Nassaria fibula Fraussen & Stahlschmidt, 2008
- Nassaria gracilis G.B. Sowerby III, 1902
- Nassaria gyroscopoides Fraussen & Poppe, 2007
- † Nassaria incerta (L. C. King, 1933)
- Nassaria incisa Fraussen, 2006
- Nassaria intacta Fraussen, 2006
- Nassaria laevior E.A. Smith, 1899
- Nassaria magnifica Lischke, 1871
- Nassaria miriamae (Dell, 1967)
- Nassaria moosai Fraussen, 2006
- Nassaria nassoides (Griffith & Pidgeon, 1834)
- Nassaria nebulonis Fraussen, Dharma & Stahlschmidt, 2009
- Nassaria okinavia (Mac Neil, 1960)
- Nassaria perlata Poppe & Fraussen, 2004
- Nassaria problematica (Iredale, 1936)
- Nassaria pusilla (Röding, 1798)
- Nassaria recurva G.B. Sowerby II, 1859
- Nassaria rickardi (Ladd, 1977)
- Nassaria sinensis G.B. Sowerby II, 1859
- Nassaria solida Kuroda & Habe in Habe, 1961
- Nassaria spinigera (Hayashi & Habe, 1965)
- Nassaria tarta Fraussen, 2006
- Nassaria teres Martens, 1902
- Nassaria termesoides Fraussen, 2006
- Nassaria thalassomeli Fraussen & Poppe, 2007
- Nassaria thesaura Fraussen & Poppe, 2007
- Nassaria turbinata (Kuroda, 1961)
- Nassaria varicosa S.-Q. Zhang & S.-P. Zhang, 2014
- Nassaria vermeiji Fraussen & Stahlschmidt, 2015
- Nassaria visayensis Fraussen & Poppe, 2007
- Nassaria wallacei Fraussen, 2006
- † Nassaria wanneri (Tesch in Wanner, 1915)

Species brought into synonymy

- Nassaria auritula Link, 1807: synonym of Gemophos auritulus (Link, 1807)
- Nassaria bushii Dall, 1889: synonym of Nassarina bushiae (Dall, 1889)
- Nassaria cirsiumoides Fraussen, 2004: synonym of Phaenomenella cirsiumoides (Fraussen, 2004)
- Nassaria columbellata Dall, 1889: synonym of Metulella columbellata (Dall, 1889)
- Nassaria kampyla Watson, 1885: synonym of Sassia kampyla (Watson, 1885)
- Nassaria laevier [sic]: synonym of Nassaria laevior E. A. Smith, 1899
- Nassaria lyrata Link, 1807: synonym of Nassaria pusilla (Röding, 1798)
- Nassaria mordica Hedley, 1909 : synonym of Orania fischeriana (Tapparone-Canefri, 1882)
- Nassaria multiplicata G. B. Sowerby II, 1859: synonym of Nassaria pusilla (Röding, 1798)
