= Nassaria wanneri =

Scientific classification
- Kingdom: Animalia
- Phylum: Mollusca
- Class: Gastropoda
- Subclass: Caenogastropoda
- Order: Neogastropoda
- Family: Nassariidae
- Genus: Nassaria
- Species: †N. wanneri

Binomial name
- †Nassaria wanneri (Tesch in Wanner, 1915)

Synonyms
- † Hindsia wanneri Tesch, 1915 (original combination); † Nassaria wanneri wanneri (Tesch, 1915); † Turricula wanneri Tesch, 1915; † Vexillum (Vexillum) wanneri Tesch, 1915

Species of gastropod

Nassaria wanneri is an extinct species of sea snail, a marine gastropod mollusc in the family Nassariidae.

Synonyms

- Nassaria wanneri visayensis Fraussen & Poppe, 2007: synonym of Nassaria visayensis Fraussen & Poppe, 2007 (original combination)
- † Nassaria wanneri wanneri (Tesch, 1915): synonym of † Nassaria wanneri (Tesch, 1915)
