= Nassaria thalassomeli =

Scientific classification
- Kingdom: Animalia
- Phylum: Mollusca
- Class: Gastropoda
- Subclass: Caenogastropoda
- Order: Neogastropoda
- Family: Nassariidae
- Genus: Nassaria
- Species: N. thalassomeli

Binomial name
- Nassaria thalassomeli Fraussen & Poppe, 2007

Species of gastropod

Nassaria thalassomeli is a species of sea snail, a marine gastropod mollusc in the family Nassariidae.
