= Nassarina thetys =

Scientific classification
- Kingdom: Animalia
- Phylum: Mollusca
- Class: Gastropoda
- Subclass: Caenogastropoda
- Order: Neogastropoda
- Family: Columbellidae
- Genus: Nassarina
- Species: N. thetys

Binomial name
- Nassarina thetys Costa & Absalao, 1998

Species of gastropod

Nassarina thetys is a species of sea snail, a marine gastropod mollusc in the family Columbellidae, the dove snails.
