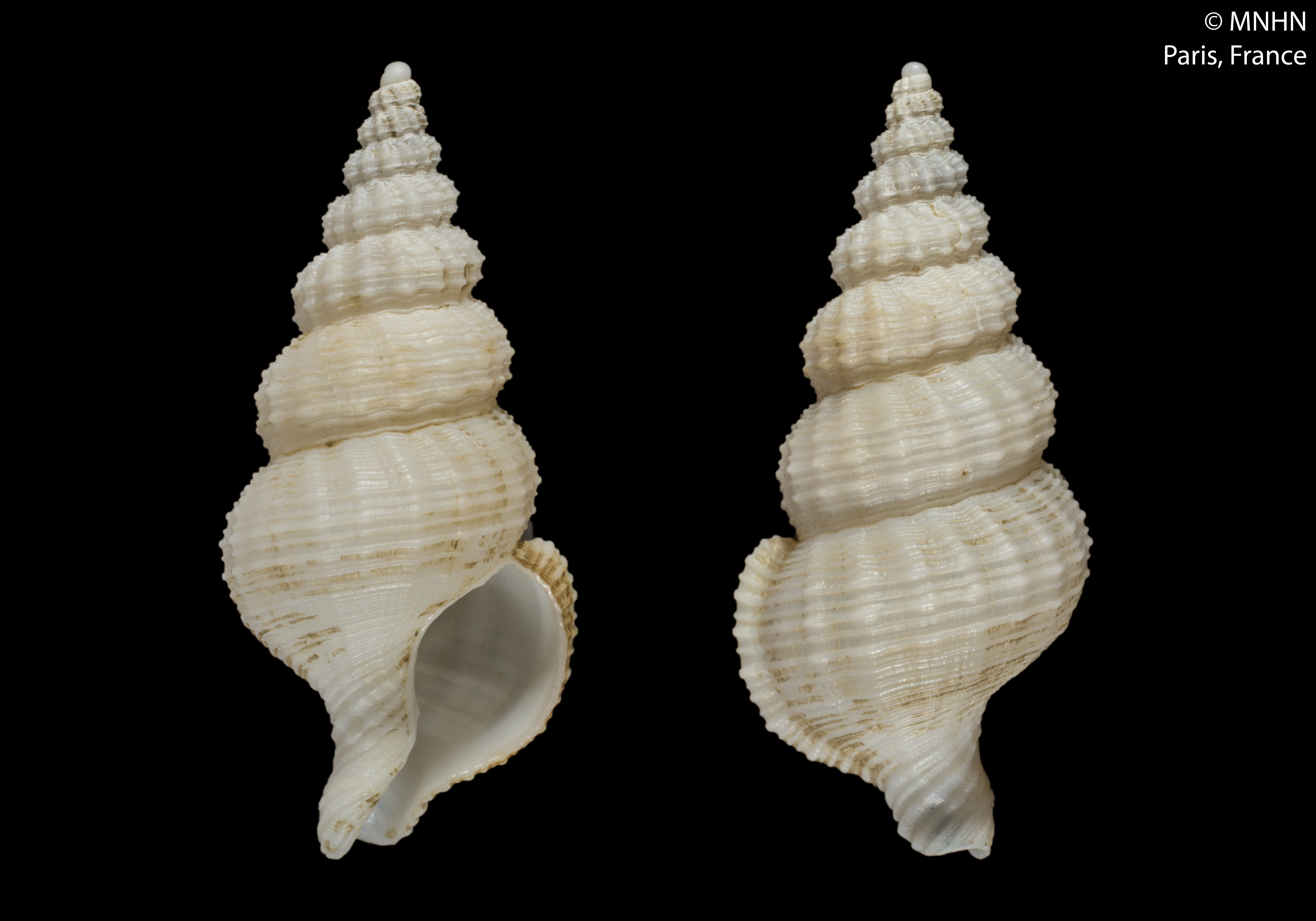
- Shell of Nassaria fibula (holotype at MNHN, Paris)

Scientific classification
- Kingdom: Animalia
- Phylum: Mollusca
- Class: Gastropoda
- Subclass: Caenogastropoda
- Order: Neogastropoda
- Family: Nassariidae
- Genus: Nassaria
- Species: N. fibula

Binomial name
- Nassaria fibula Fraussen & Stahlschmidt, 2008

= Nassaria fibula =

Species of gastropod

Nassaria fibula is a species of sea snail, a marine gastropod mollusk in the family Nassariidae.

== Description ==
The length of the shell attains 24.8 mm.

== Distribution ==
This marine species occurs in the East China Sea.
