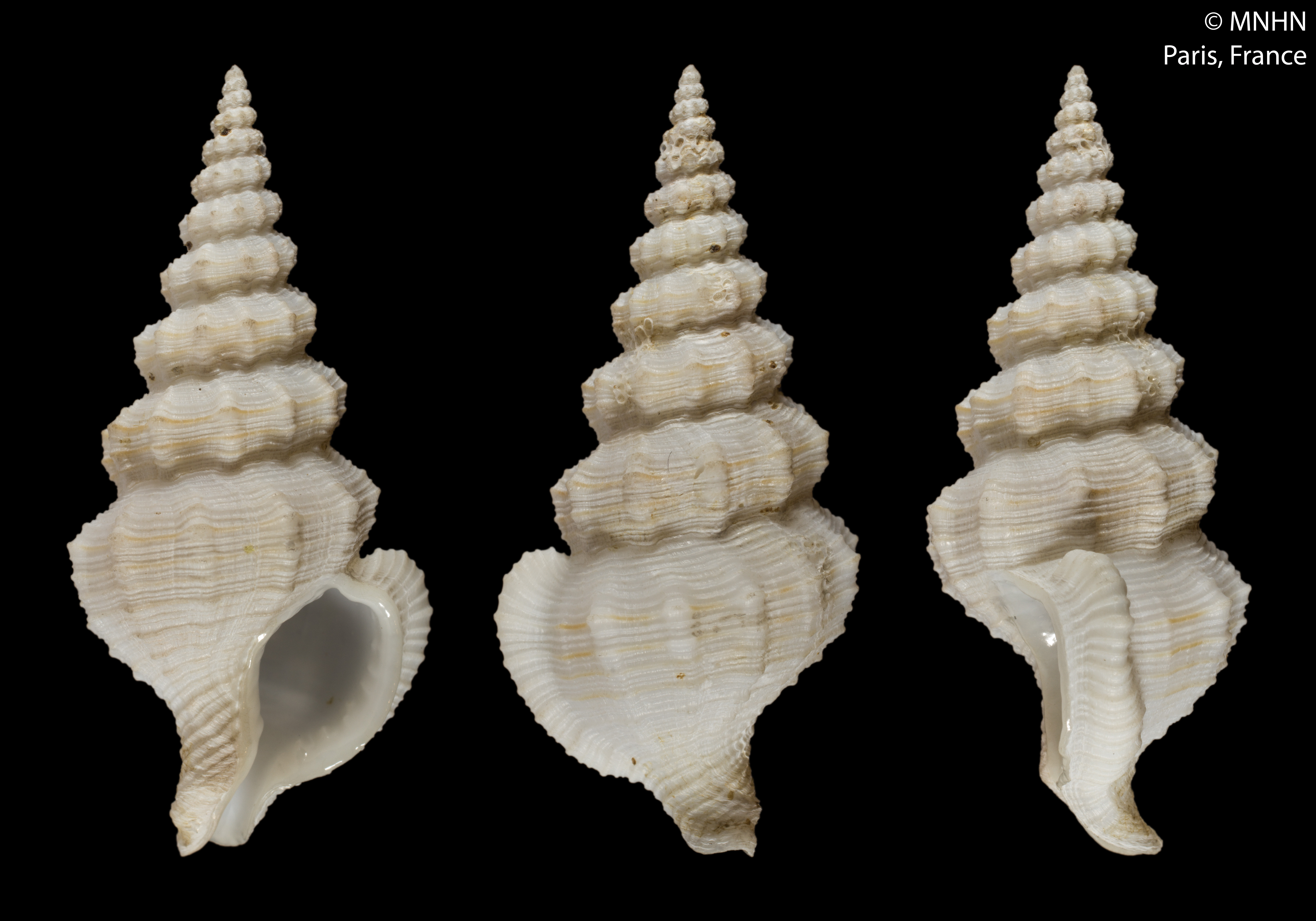
- Shell of Nassaria tarta (holotype at MNHN, Paris)

Scientific classification
- Kingdom: Animalia
- Phylum: Mollusca
- Class: Gastropoda
- Subclass: Caenogastropoda
- Order: Neogastropoda
- Family: Nassariidae
- Genus: Nassaria
- Species: N. tarta

Binomial name
- Nassaria tarta Fraussen, 2006

= Nassaria tarta =

Species of gastropod

Nassaria tarta is a species of sea snail, a marine gastropod mollusc in the family Nassariidae.

== Description ==
The Nassaria tarta has a shell up to 37 mm in length, with a solid construction and thick walls. The shell is snow-white, with occasional fine red spiral lines on the body

== Distribution ==
This marine species occurs off Tanimbar Island, Indonesia.
