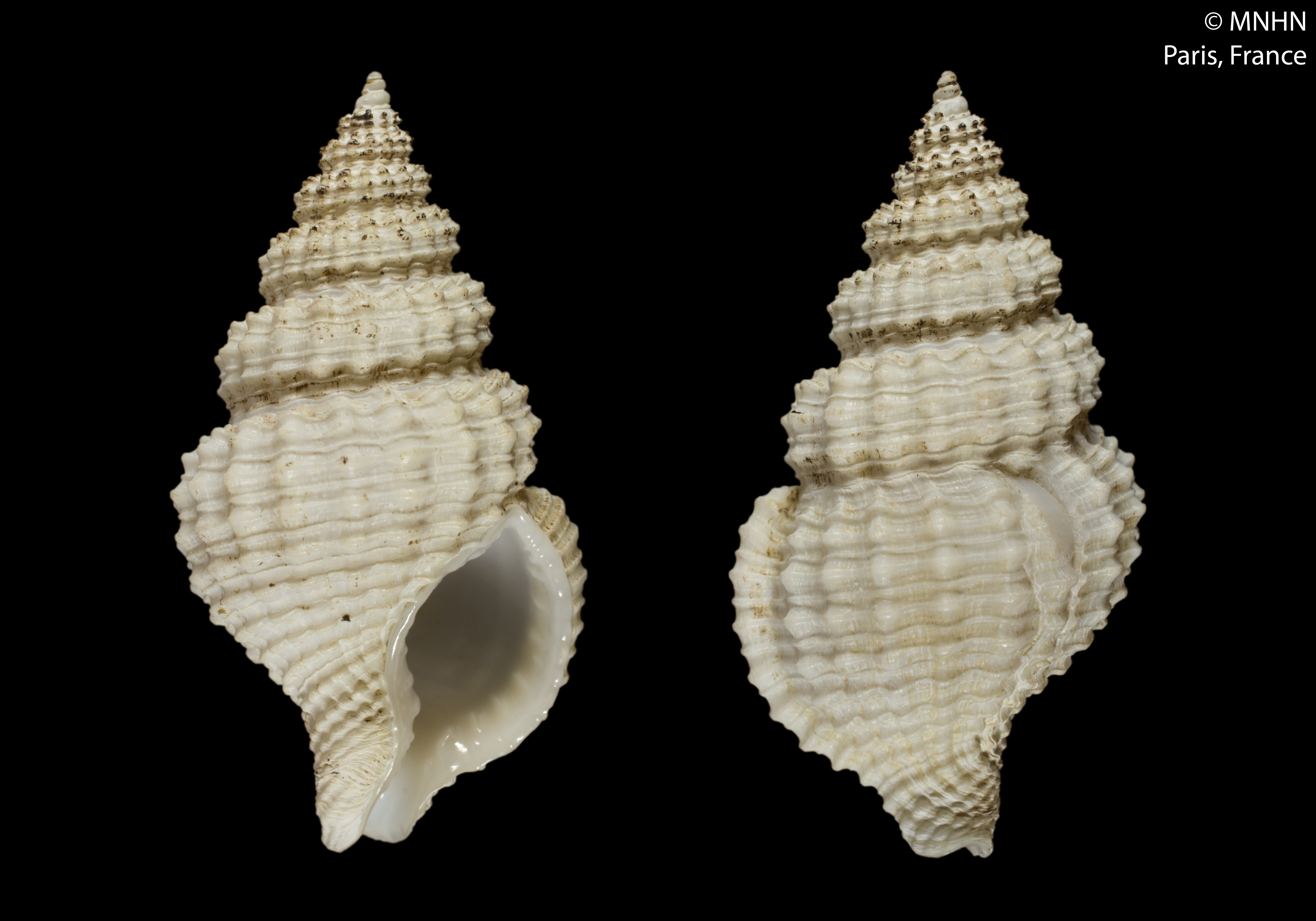
- Shell of Nassaria corollaria (holotype at MNHN, Paris)

Scientific classification
- Kingdom: Animalia
- Phylum: Mollusca
- Class: Gastropoda
- Subclass: Caenogastropoda
- Order: Neogastropoda
- Family: Nassariidae
- Genus: Nassaria
- Species: N. corollaria

Binomial name
- Nassaria corollaria Fraussen, 2006

= Nassaria corollaria =

Species of gastropod

Nassaria corollaria is a species of sea snail, a marine gastropod mollusc in the family Nassariidae.

== Description ==
The length of the shell attains 26.6 mm.

== Distribution ==
This marine species occurs off Tanimbar Island, Indonesia.
