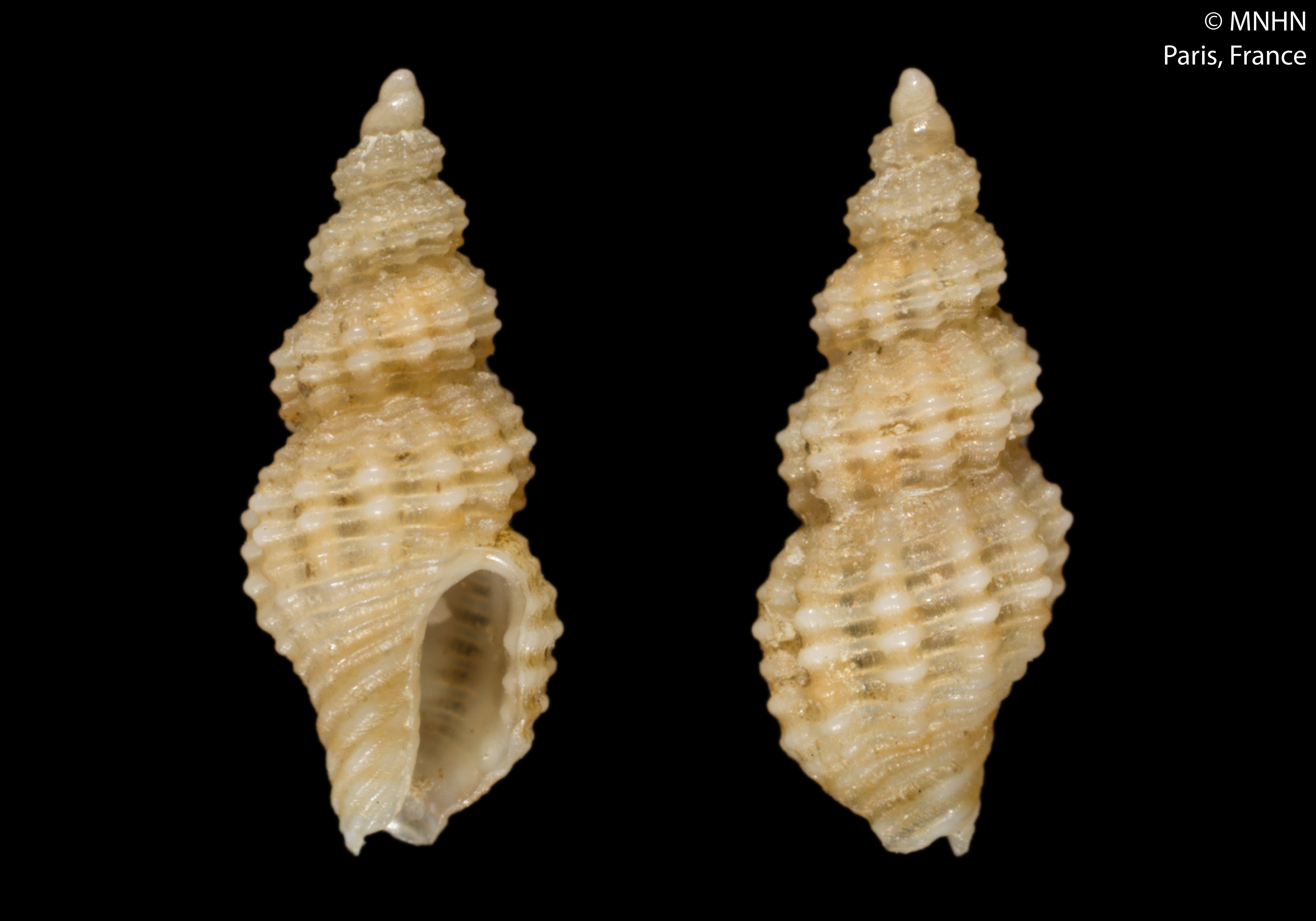

Scientific classification
- Kingdom: Animalia
- Phylum: Mollusca
- Class: Gastropoda
- Subclass: Caenogastropoda
- Order: Neogastropoda
- Family: Columbellidae
- Genus: Nassarina
- Species: N. rolani

Binomial name
- Nassarina rolani Pelorce & Boyer, 2005

= Nassarina rolani =

Species of gastropod

Nassarina rolani is a species of sea snail, a marine gastropod mollusc in the family Columbellidae, the dove snails.
