= Nassarina metabrunnea =

Scientific classification
- Kingdom: Animalia
- Phylum: Mollusca
- Class: Gastropoda
- Subclass: Caenogastropoda
- Order: Neogastropoda
- Family: Columbellidae
- Genus: Nassarina
- Species: N. metabrunnea

Binomial name
- Nassarina metabrunnea Dall & Simpson, 1901

Species of gastropod

Nassarina metabrunnea is a species of sea snail, a marine gastropod mollusc in the family Columbellidae, the dove snails.
