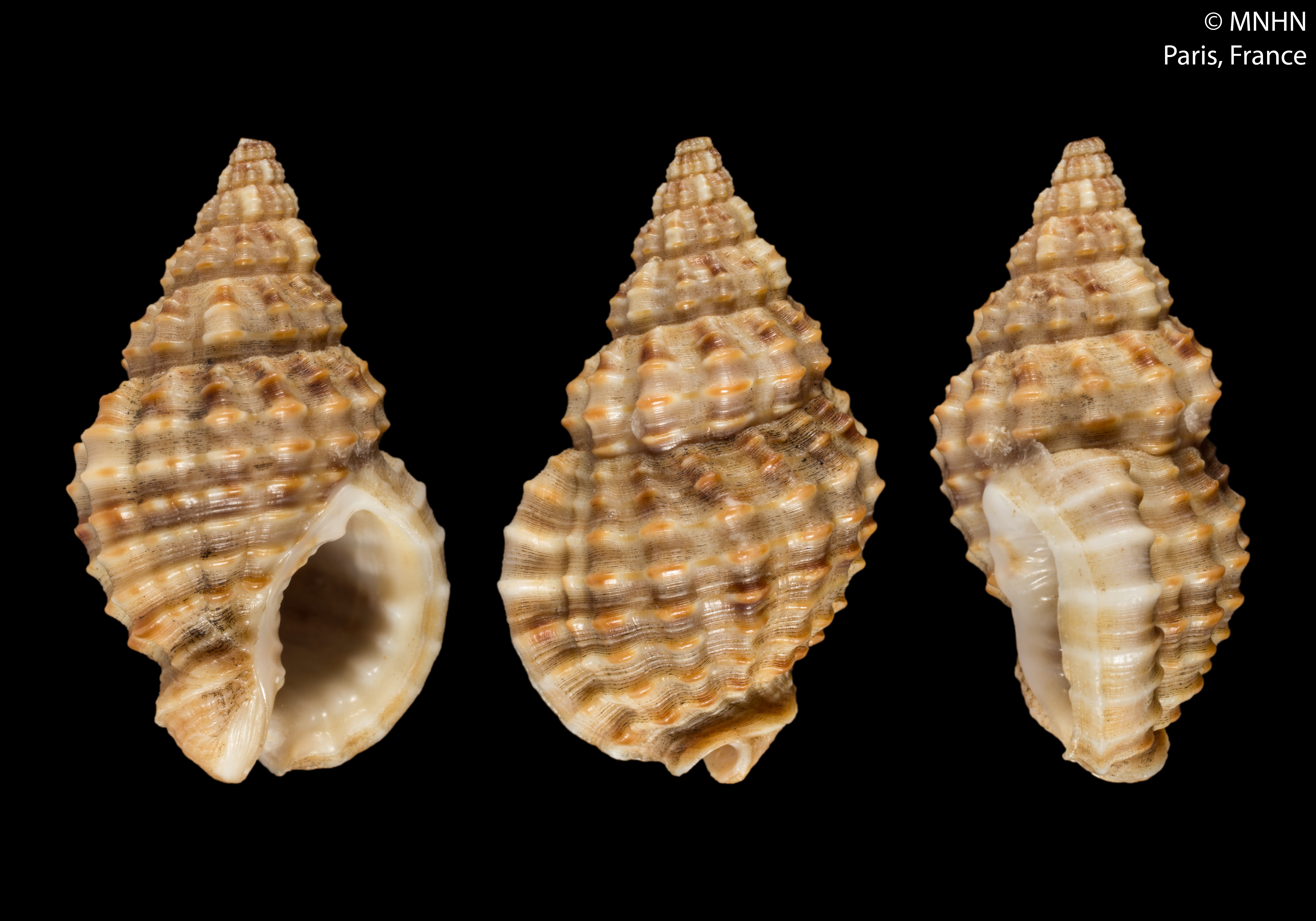
- Shell of Nassaria nebulonis (holotype at MNHN, Paris)

Scientific classification
- Kingdom: Animalia
- Phylum: Mollusca
- Class: Gastropoda
- Subclass: Caenogastropoda
- Order: Neogastropoda
- Family: Nassariidae
- Genus: Nassaria
- Species: N. nebulonis

Binomial name
- Nassaria nebulonis Fraussen, Dharma & Stahlschmidt, 2009

= Nassaria nebulonis =

Species of gastropod

Nassaria nebulonis is a species of sea snail, a marine gastropod mollusc in the family Nassariidae.

== Description ==
The length of the shell attains 21.9 mm.

Nassaria nebulonis is characterized by its conchological differences in sculpture and shape, distinguishing it from its closest congener, Nassaria palembangensis. This species is notable for its broad shape with strong laterally situated varices at an angle of 180° from each other, suggesting a distinct phenotypical branch. The coloration of Nassaria nebulonis is distinctive, featuring a palette of earthy and marine tones that blend seamlessly with its natural habitat. The shell typically exhibits a range of hues from sandy beige to deeper oceanic blues, accented by subtle striations and patterns that enhance its visual appeal. This species is found both alive (Recent) and in fossil strata from the Early Pleistocene, highlighting its long-standing presence in the region.

== Distribution ==
This marine species occurs off Java, Indonesia.
