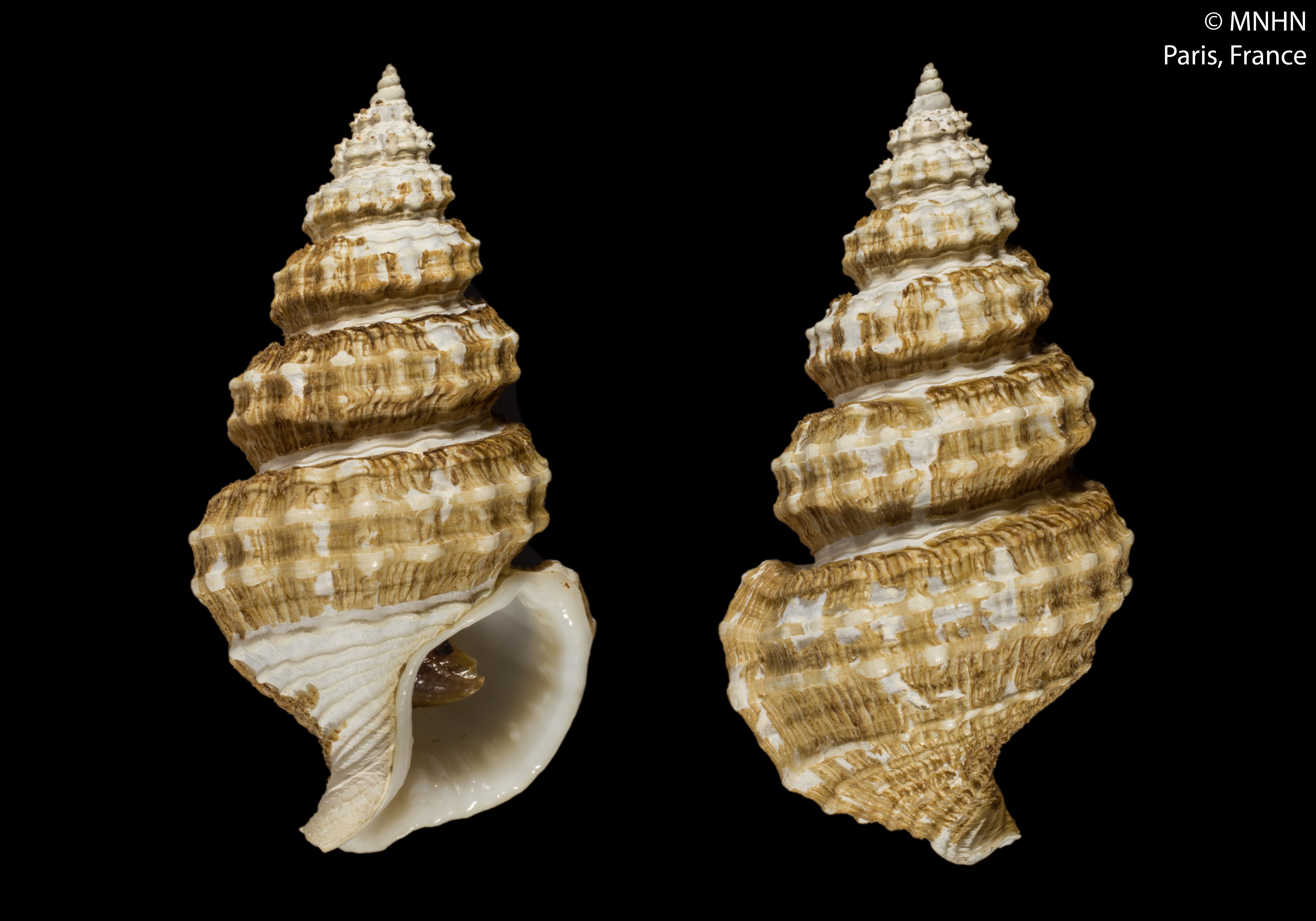
- Shell of Nassaria incisa (holotype at MNHN, Paris)

Scientific classification
- Kingdom: Animalia
- Phylum: Mollusca
- Class: Gastropoda
- Subclass: Caenogastropoda
- Order: Neogastropoda
- Family: Nassariidae
- Genus: Nassaria
- Species: N. incisa

Binomial name
- Nassaria incisa Fraussen, 2006

= Nassaria incisa =

Species of gastropod

Nassaria incisa is a species of sea snail, a marine gastropod mollusc in the family Nassariidae.

== Description ==
The length of the shell attains 39.5 mm.

== Distribution ==
This marine species occurs off Tanimbar Island, Indonesia.
