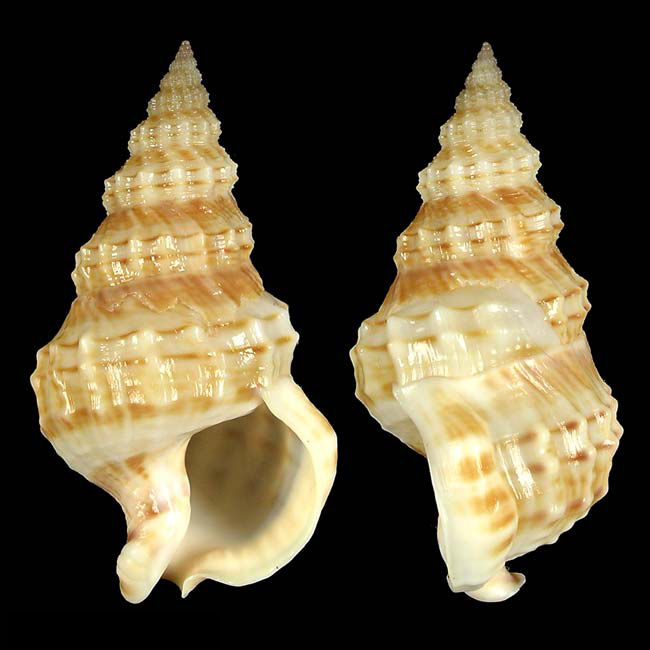

Scientific classification
- Kingdom: Animalia
- Phylum: Mollusca
- Class: Gastropoda
- Subclass: Caenogastropoda
- Order: Neogastropoda
- Family: Nassariidae
- Genus: Nassaria
- Species: N. thesaura

Binomial name
- Nassaria thesaura Fraussen & Poppe, 2007

= Nassaria thesaura =

Species of gastropod

Nassaria thesaura is a species of sea snail, a marine gastropod mollusc in the family Nassariidae.
