= Nassaria gracilis =

Scientific classification
- Kingdom: Animalia
- Phylum: Mollusca
- Class: Gastropoda
- Subclass: Caenogastropoda
- Order: Neogastropoda
- Family: Nassariidae
- Genus: Nassaria
- Species: N. gracilis

Binomial name
- Nassaria gracilis G.B. Sowerby III, 1902

Species of gastropod

Nassaria gracilis is a species of sea snail, a marine gastropod mollusc in the family Nassariidae.
