= Steironepion =

Scientific classification
- Kingdom: Animalia
- Phylum: Mollusca
- Class: Gastropoda
- Subclass: Caenogastropoda
- Order: Neogastropoda
- Family: Columbellidae
- Genus: Steironepion; Pilsbry & Lowe, 1932

Type species
- Mangelia melanosticta Pilsbry & Lowe, 1932

Genus of gastropods

Steironepion is a genus of sea snails, marine gastropod molluscs in the family Columbellidae, the dove snails.

== Species ==
- Steironepion hancocki (Hertlein & Strong, 1939)
- Steironepion maculatum (C. B. Adams, 1850)
- Steironepion minor (Adams, 1845)
- Steironepion minus (C. B. Adams, 1845)
- Steironepion moniliferum (Sowerby I, 1844)
- Steironepion piperatum (E.A. Smith, 1882)
- Steironepion pygmaeum (C. B. Adams, 1850)
- Steironepion tinctum (Carpenter, 1864)
