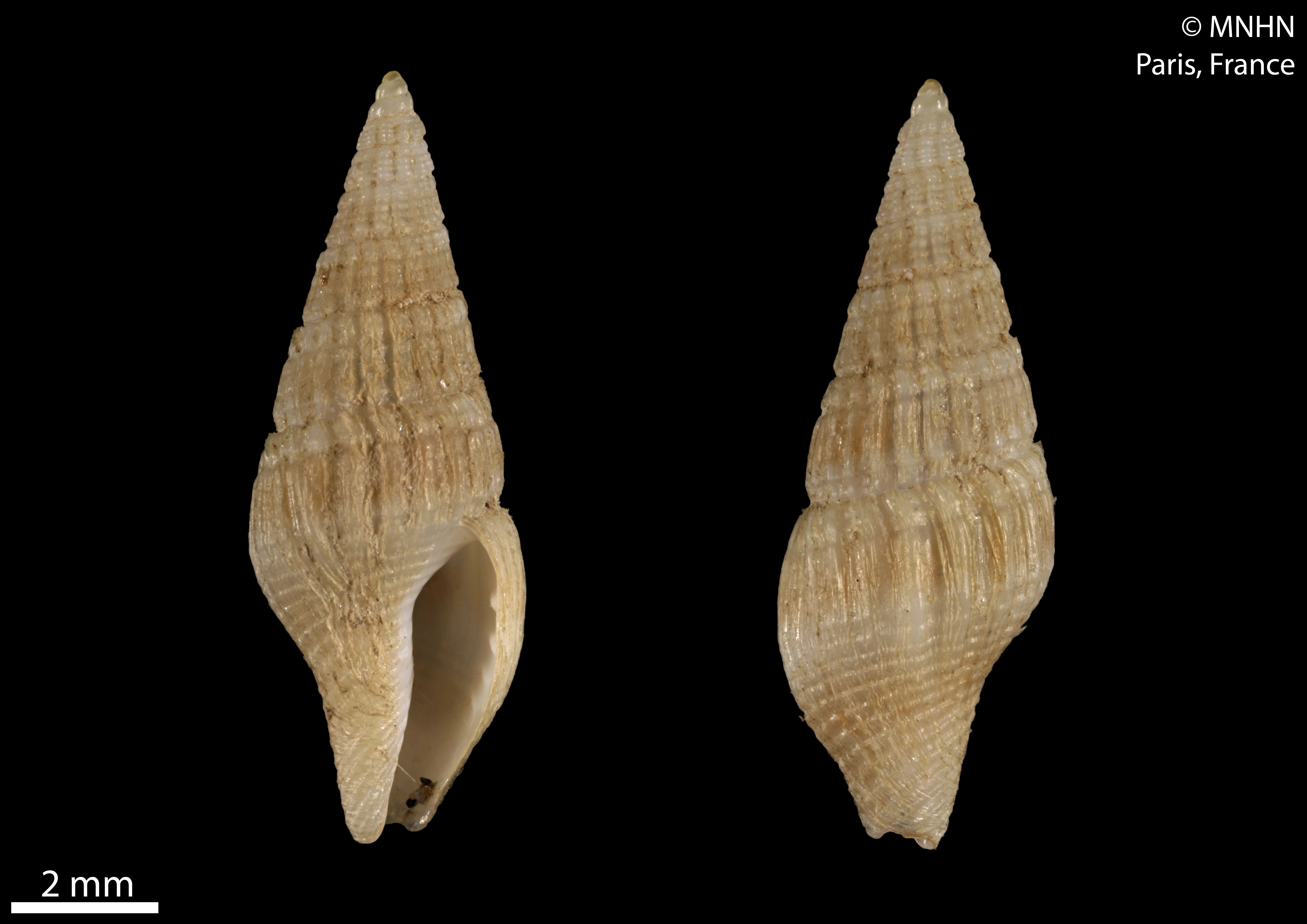
- Shell of Metulella columbellata (specimen at MNHN, Paris)

Scientific classification
- Kingdom: Animalia
- Phylum: Mollusca
- Class: Gastropoda
- Subclass: Caenogastropoda
- Order: Neogastropoda
- Family: Columbellidae
- Genus: Metulella; Gabb, 1873

Type species
- † Metulella fusiformis Gabb, 1873

= Metulella =

Genus of gastropods

Metulella is a genus of sea snails, marine gastropod molluscs in the family Columbellidae, the dove snails.

== Species ==
Species within the genus Metulella include:

- Metulella columbellata (Dall, 1889)
- † Metulella fusiformis Gabb, 1873
- † Metulella venusta (G. B. Sowerby I, 1850)
