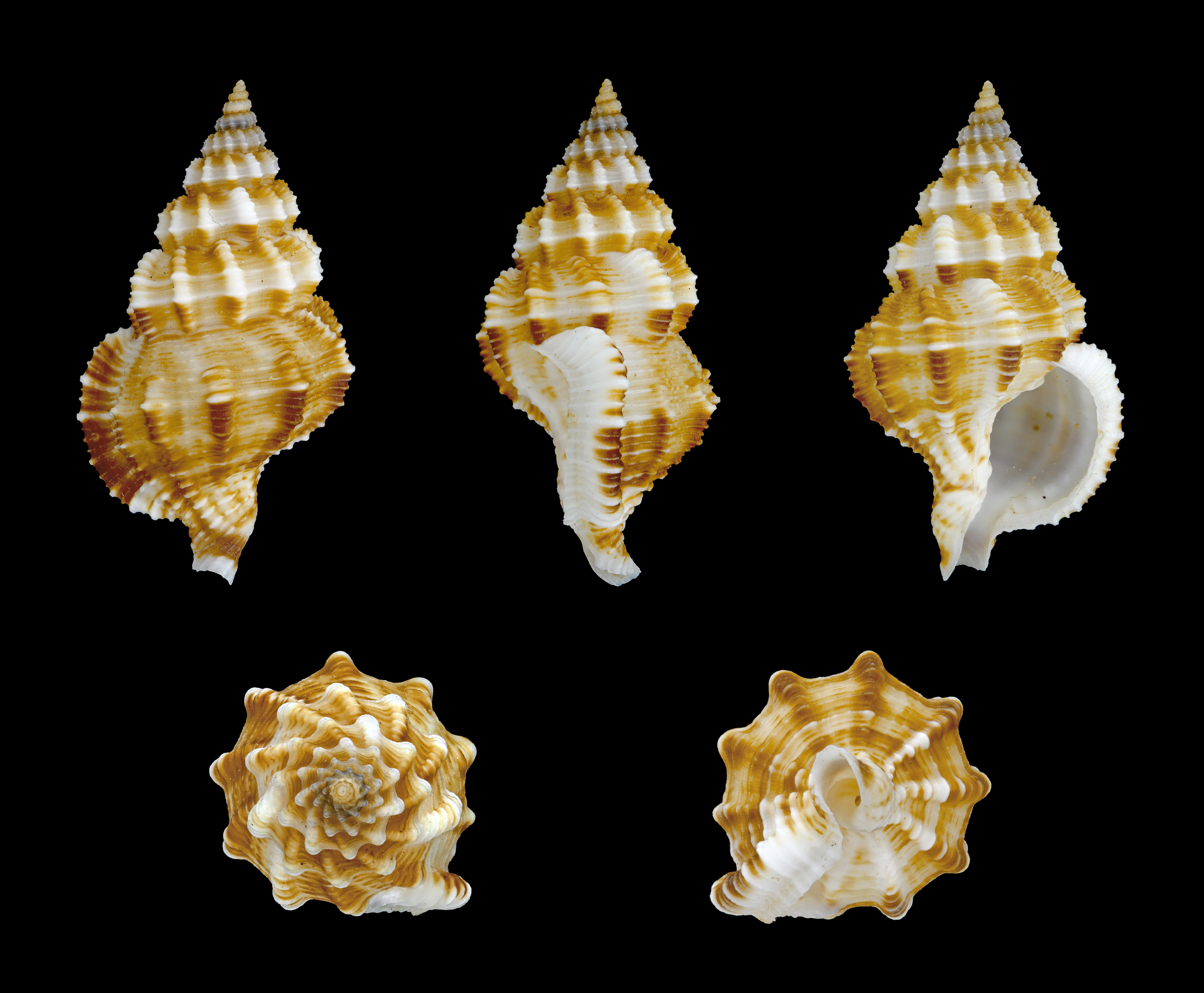

Scientific classification
- Kingdom: Animalia
- Phylum: Mollusca
- Class: Gastropoda
- Subclass: Caenogastropoda
- Order: Neogastropoda
- Family: Nassariidae
- Genus: Nassaria
- Species: N. acuminata

Binomial name
- Nassaria acuminata (Reeve, 1881)

Synonyms
- Triton acuminatus Reeve, 1881

= Nassaria acuminata =

Species of gastropod

Nassaria acuminata is a species of sea snail, a marine gastropod mollusc in the family Nassariidae.
