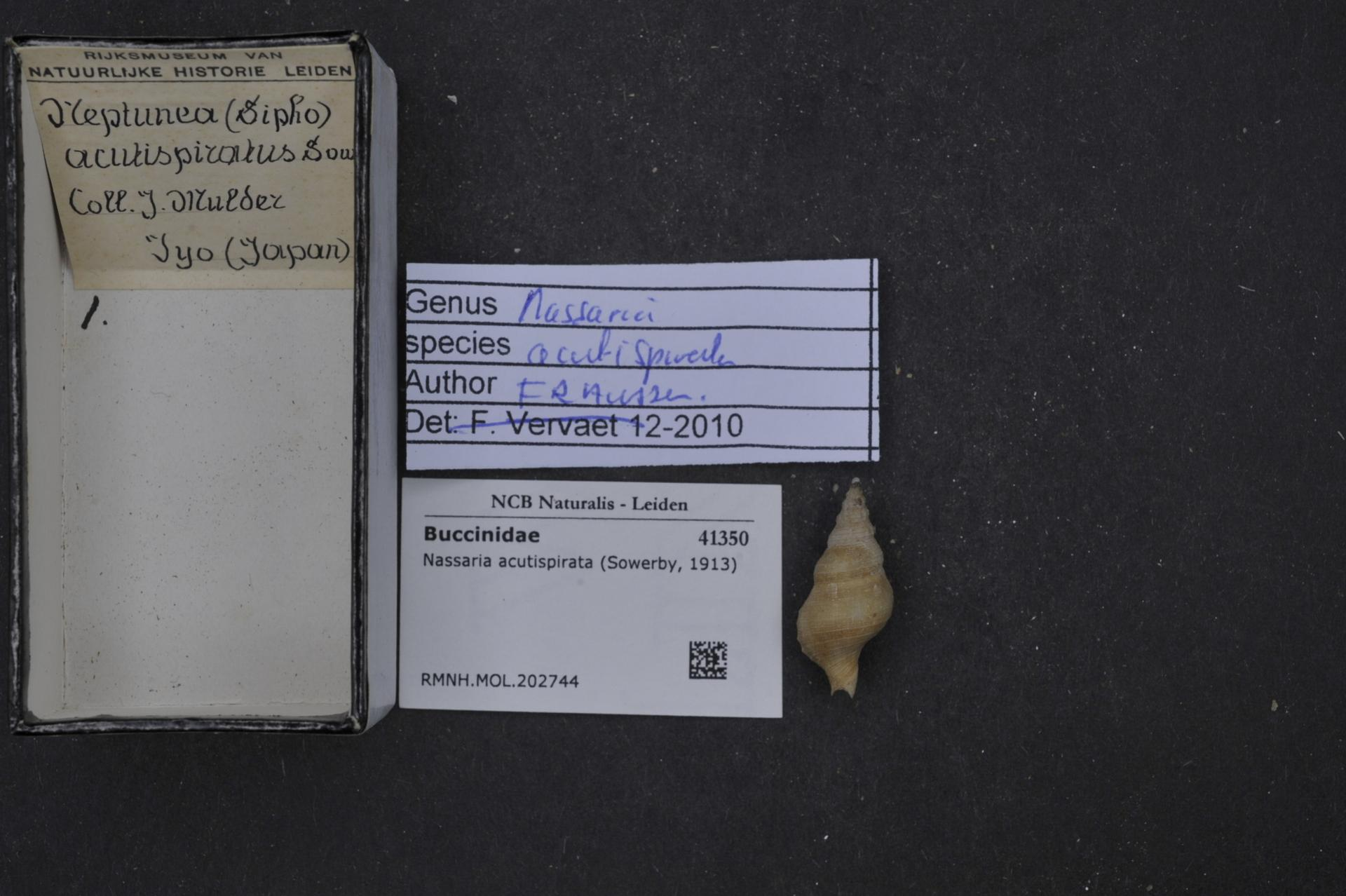
- Preserved specimen

Scientific classification
- Kingdom: Animalia
- Phylum: Mollusca
- Class: Gastropoda
- Subclass: Caenogastropoda
- Order: Neogastropoda
- Family: Nassariidae
- Genus: Nassaria
- Species: N. acutispirata

Binomial name
- Nassaria acutispirata (G. B. Sowerby III, 1913)

Synonyms
- Microfusus acutispirata obesiformis

= Nassaria acutispirata =

Species of gastropod

Nassaria acutispirata is a species of Nassariidae.

The species is distributed offshore of Iwate Prefecture. The species was first described by George Brettingham Sowerby III in 1913.
