= Nassarina glypta =

Scientific classification
- Kingdom: Animalia
- Phylum: Mollusca
- Class: Gastropoda
- Subclass: Caenogastropoda
- Order: Neogastropoda
- Family: Columbellidae
- Genus: Nassarina
- Species: N. glypta

Binomial name
- Nassarina glypta (Bush, 1885)

Species of gastropod

Nassarina glypta is a species of sea snail, a marine gastropod mollusc in the family Columbellidae, the dove snails.
