= Steironepion maculatum =

Scientific classification
- Kingdom: Animalia
- Phylum: Mollusca
- Class: Gastropoda
- Subclass: Caenogastropoda
- Order: Neogastropoda
- Family: Columbellidae
- Genus: Steironepion
- Species: S. maculatum

Binomial name
- Steironepion maculatum (C. B. Adams, 1850)

Species of gastropod

Steironepion maculatum is a species of sea snail, a marine gastropod mollusc in the family Columbellidae, the dove snails.
