= Steironepion minus =

Scientific classification
- Kingdom: Animalia
- Phylum: Mollusca
- Class: Gastropoda
- Subclass: Caenogastropoda
- Order: Neogastropoda
- Family: Columbellidae
- Genus: Steironepion
- Species: S. minus

Binomial name
- Steironepion minus (C. B. Adams, 1845)

Species of gastropod

Steironepion minus is a species of sea snail, a marine gastropod mollusc in the family Columbellidae, the dove snails.
