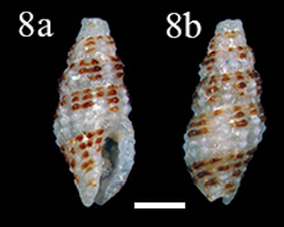

Scientific classification
- Kingdom: Animalia
- Phylum: Mollusca
- Class: Gastropoda
- Subclass: Caenogastropoda
- Order: Neogastropoda
- Family: Columbellidae
- Genus: Steironepion
- Species: S. moniliferum

Binomial name
- Steironepion moniliferum (Sowerby I, 1844)

Synonyms
- Columbella monilifera G.B. Sowerby I, 1844 (basionym); Columbella telea Duclos, 1848; Psarostola monilifera (Sowerby II, 1844); Psarostola monilifera monilifera (Sowerby II, 1844); Psarostola monilifera sparsipunctata Rehder, 1943

= Steironepion moniliferum =

Species of gastropod

Steironepion moniliferum is a species of sea snail, a marine gastropod mollusc in the family Columbellidae, the dove snails.

== Distribution ==
This species occurs in the Caribbean Sea, the Gulf of Mexico and the Lesser Antilles.
