= Nassarina bushiae =

Scientific classification
- Kingdom: Animalia
- Phylum: Mollusca
- Class: Gastropoda
- Subclass: Caenogastropoda
- Order: Neogastropoda
- Family: Columbellidae
- Genus: Nassarina
- Species: N. bushiae

Binomial name
- Nassarina bushiae (Dall, 1889)

Species of gastropod

Nassarina bushiae is a species of sea snail, a marine gastropod mollusc in the family Columbellidae, the dove snails.
