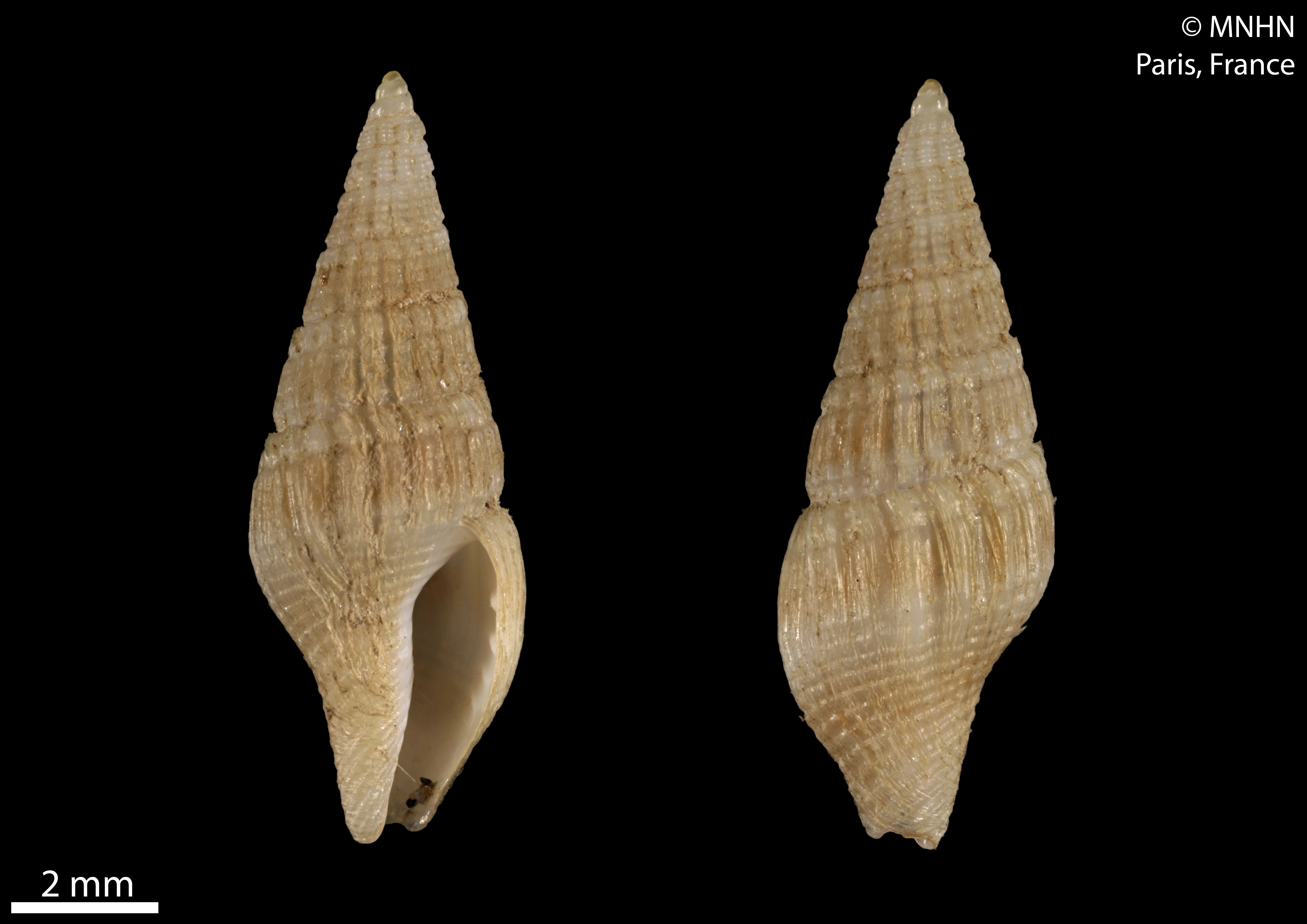

Scientific classification
- Kingdom: Animalia
- Phylum: Mollusca
- Class: Gastropoda
- Subclass: Caenogastropoda
- Order: Neogastropoda
- Family: Columbellidae
- Genus: Metulella
- Species: M. columbellata

Binomial name
- Metulella columbellata (Dall, 1889)

= Metulella columbellata =

Species of gastropod

Metulella columbellata is a species of sea snail, a marine gastropod mollusc in the family Columbellidae, the dove snails.
