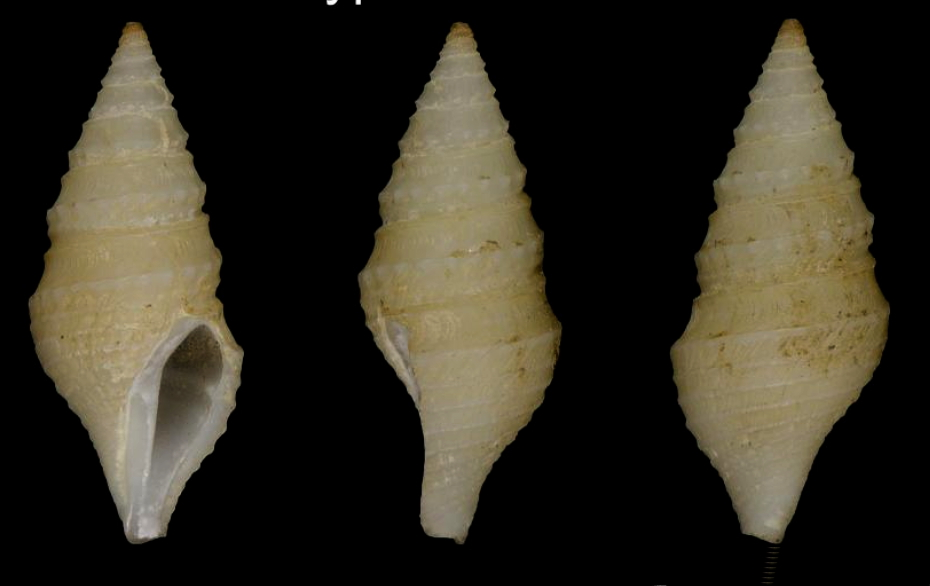
- Shell of Mangelia subsida (holotype at the Smithsonian Institution)

Scientific classification
- Kingdom: Animalia
- Phylum: Mollusca
- Class: Gastropoda
- Subclass: Caenogastropoda
- Order: Neogastropoda
- Superfamily: Conoidea
- Family: Mangeliidae
- Genus: Mangelia
- Species: M. subsida

Binomial name
- Mangelia subsida (Dall, 1881)

Synonyms
- Drillia subsida (W.H. Dall, 1881); Fusus simplex Grateloup, J.P.S. de, 1847; Pleurotoma (Drillia) subsida Dall, 1881 (original combination)

= Mangelia subsida =

Species of gastropod

Mangelia subsida is a species of sea snail, a marine gastropod mollusk in the family Mangeliidae.

== Description ==
The length of the shell attains 13 mm, its diameter 6 mm.

(Original description) The stout, solid, fusiform shell is waxy white. it contains nine whorls. The protoconch is brown and smooth. The first three subsequent whorls are sculptured with neat flexuous ribs transversely disposed. The next four whorls are crossed transversely with only the rather strong and distinct rounded lines of growth which cover pretty much all the rest of the shell except the tops of the longitudinal riblets. The longitudinal sculpture shows a keel just in advance of the suture upon which the posterior edge of the former is appressed, then a few faint revolving striae on the bi'oad notch-band, then two more keels, or sharp squarish riblets (on the body whorl ten or twelve). The first are marked with numerous knobby waves extending forward in the interspace toward the second keel rather than outwardly, and sometimes meeting and slightly waving the second keel. These waves make their appearance on about the fifth whorl, and are evanescent on the last whorl. There are about three in a millimeter and a half. The aperture is narrow and slightly callous. The short siphonal canal is nearly straight. The columella is covered with a thin, translucent white callus. The outer lip is not thickened, but might become so in an older shell.

== Distribution ==
M. subsida can be found in waters of the Florida Strait. and Dry Tortugas at a depth of 620 m.
