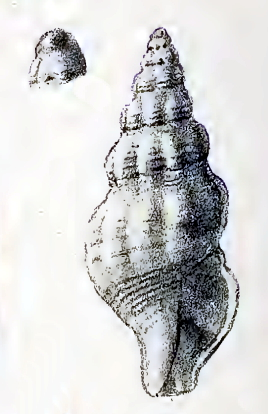
- Original image of the shell (and the protoconch) of Mangelia tanabensis

Scientific classification
- Kingdom: Animalia
- Phylum: Mollusca
- Class: Gastropoda
- Subclass: Caenogastropoda
- Order: Neogastropoda
- Superfamily: Conoidea
- Family: Mangeliidae
- Genus: Mangelia
- Species: M. tanabensis

Binomial name
- Mangelia tanabensis J.C. Melvill, 1923

= Mangelia tanabensis =

Species of gastropod

Mangelia tanabensis is a species of sea snail, a marine gastropod mollusk in the family Mangeliidae.

== Description ==
The length of the shell attains 14 mm, its diameter 4 mm.

The solid, white shell is longitudinally multicostate. The ribs are straight, at first, with the interstices, surrounded with deep revolving sulcate spiral lines, but soon becoming worn, and then are smooth and shining. One example is plain, without bands or coloured lines, another possesses two lines on the upper whorls. On the body whorl these are supplemented by a broad chestnut-brown band at the periphery, extending round the shell to the lower part of the outer lip. The aperture is ovate. The outer lip is white, shining, smooth, thickened. The sinus is small but well expressed, situated just below the suture. The siphonal canal is abbreviate. The columellar margin is smooth.

This is a pretty, small, but solid shell, many-ribbed, surrounded with sulcate revolving lines, the surface being sometimes plain and unrelieved, or lined and banded with chestnut-brown.

== Distribution ==
This marine species occurs off Japan.
