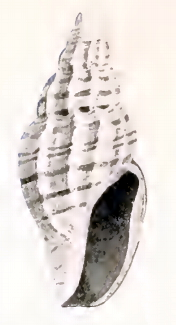
- Original image of a shell of Mangelia louisa

Scientific classification
- Kingdom: Animalia
- Phylum: Mollusca
- Class: Gastropoda
- Subclass: Caenogastropoda
- Order: Neogastropoda
- Superfamily: Conoidea
- Family: Mangeliidae
- Genus: Mangelia
- Species: M. louisa

Binomial name
- Mangelia louisa (W.H. Dall, 1919)

Synonyms
- Cytharella louisa W.H. Dall, 1919 (original description)

= Mangelia louisa =

Species of gastropod

Mangelia louisa is a species of sea snail, a marine gastropod mollusk in the family Mangeliidae.

== Description ==
The length of the shell attains 4.25 mm, its diameter 1.7 mm.

(Original description) The minute shell has a protoconch with a small apex. The whorl is later swollen. The second whorl shows three strong spiral threads. The following three whorls contain 11 or 12 axial ribs with subequal interspaces and no pronounced shoulder. The spiral sculpture between the sutures of three consists of strong subequal flattish threads somewhat swollen when they override the ribs, and with a few much finer threads in the interspaces between the major threads. The spaces between the reticulation on the earlier whorls are deep and have a pitlike aspect. Near the suture in fresh specimens is a dark spiral band extending to the rounded shoulder, in front of which the shell is yellowish white with (on the body whorl) four or five narrow brown spiral lines with much wider interspaces. The aperture is moderately wide with a very shallow ill-defined sulcus. The outer lip is thickened and smooth. The siphonal canal is wide, not differentiated from the aperture. The inner lip is smooth.

== Distribution ==
This marine species occurs off California, USA.
