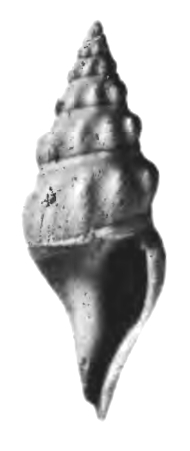
- Original image of a shell of Mangelia china

Scientific classification
- Kingdom: Animalia
- Phylum: Mollusca
- Class: Gastropoda
- Subclass: Caenogastropoda
- Order: Neogastropoda
- Superfamily: Conoidea
- Family: Mangeliidae
- Genus: Mangelia
- Species: M. china

Binomial name
- Mangelia china F.S. MacNeil, 1960

= Mangelia china =

Extinct species of gastropod

Mangelia china is an extinct species of sea snail, a marine gastropod mollusk in the family Mangeliidae.

== Description ==
The length of the shell attains 14 mm, its diameter 5 mm.

(Original description) The small shell has a fusiform shape. Its whorls are bluntly carinate. The spire is moderately sharp, of about the same length as the aperture. The protoconch is not well enough preserved on the type for description. The aperture is of medium width, narrowing anteriorly where it is produced to form a siphonal canal of moderate length. The outer lip is not preserved on the type but shown by growth lines to recurve above the periphery to form a moderately broad, moderately deep sinus. The parietal wall is lightly callused posteriorly and slightly resorbed anteriorly. The sculpture consists of blunt, slightly protractive axial ribs, about seven visible from an angle, and fine somewhat irregular spiral lirations which are slightly more crowded on the subsutural slope and slightly coarser on the columella. Some secondary threads are present. The suture is appressed with a well defined subsutural collar.

== Distribution ==
This extinct marine species was found in Miocene strata of Okinawa, Japan.
