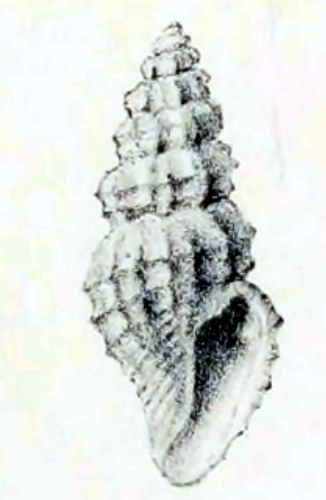
- Original image of a shell of Mangelia posidonia

Scientific classification
- Kingdom: Animalia
- Phylum: Mollusca
- Class: Gastropoda
- Subclass: Caenogastropoda
- Order: Neogastropoda
- Superfamily: Conoidea
- Family: Mangeliidae
- Genus: Mangelia
- Species: M. posidonia

Binomial name
- Mangelia posidonia J.C. Melvill, 1904

= Mangelia posidonia =

Species of gastropod

Mangelia posidonia is a species of sea snail, a marine gastropod mollusc in the family Mangeliidae.

== Description ==
The length of the shell attains 5 mm, its diameter 2 mm.

This is a solid white shell with a short fusiform shape. It contains 8 whorls of which 2½ smooth, vitreous whorls in the protoconch. The subsequent whorls are much impressed at the suture. They contain a few axial ribs, crossed spirally by angulate lirae (eight lirae in the body whorl). The narrow aperture is oblong. The outer lip is incrassate. The columella is simple.

== Distribution ==
This marine species occurs in the Gulf of Oman.
