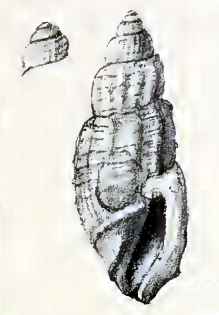
- Original image of a shell (and protoconch) of Mangelia erymna

Scientific classification
- Kingdom: Animalia
- Phylum: Mollusca
- Class: Gastropoda
- Subclass: Caenogastropoda
- Order: Neogastropoda
- Superfamily: Conoidea
- Family: Mangeliidae
- Genus: Mangelia
- Species: M. erymna

Binomial name
- Mangelia erymna J.C. Melvill, 1917

Synonyms
- Mangilia erymna J.C. Melvill, 1917

= Mangelia erymna =

Species of gastropod

Mangelia erymna is a species of sea snail, a marine gastropod mollusk in the family Mangeliidae.

== Description ==
The length of the shell attains 4 mm, its diameter 2 mm.

(Original description) This is a curious, thickened, very minute, somewhat corrugate shell, of a pale pink colour. The shell contains 5 whorls. The two apical whorls are rather flat. The third apical whorl is globular and closely cancellate. The two lower whorls are coarsely ribbed and spirally lirate. The body whorl contains 10 ribs and 11 lirae. The lowest lira on the body whorl is very strongly ridged, while below this to the base the shell is fairly smooth. The outer lip is very thickened. The sinus is hardly expressed,. The columellar margin is oblique and simple. The narrow aperture is oblong. The siphonal canal is very short.

== Distribution ==
This marine species occurs off Western India.
