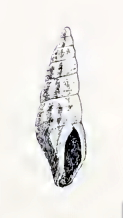
- Original image of a shell of Mangelia hooveri

Scientific classification
- Kingdom: Animalia
- Phylum: Mollusca
- Class: Gastropoda
- Subclass: Caenogastropoda
- Order: Neogastropoda
- Superfamily: Conoidea
- Family: Mangeliidae
- Genus: Mangelia
- Species: M. hooveri

Binomial name
- Mangelia hooveri R. Arnold, 1903

Synonyms
- Mangilia hooveri R. Arnold, 1903

= Mangelia hooveri =

Extinct species of gastropod

Mangelia hooveri is an extinct species of sea snail, a marine gastropod mollusk in the family Mangeliidae.

== Description ==
The length of the shell attains 10.9 mm, its diameter 3 mm.

(Original description) The small, solid shell has an elongate-fusiform shape. The spire is elevated with a mammilliform apex. It contains six whorls, only slightly convex, with about ten low, rounded, slightly oblique, transverse ridges. The first whorl is smooth, while the next three are more convex than the lower ones, and have traces of spiral sculpture. The sculpture of the body whorl is nearly obsolete. The aperture is elliptical, tapering to a very short siphonal canal anteriorly. The outer lip is arcuate and thin. The columella is quite long and straight.

== Distribution ==
This extinct marine species was found off San Pedro, California, USA.
