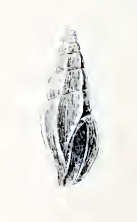
- Original image of a shell of Mangelia branneri

Scientific classification
- Kingdom: Animalia
- Phylum: Mollusca
- Class: Gastropoda
- Subclass: Caenogastropoda
- Order: Neogastropoda
- Superfamily: Conoidea
- Family: Mangeliidae
- Genus: Mangelia
- Species: M. branneri

Binomial name
- Mangelia branneri (R. Arnold, 1903)

Synonyms
- Cytharella branneri (R. Arnold, 1903); Mangilia (Cythara) branneri R. Arnold, 1903 (original description)

= Mangelia branneri =

Extinct species of gastropod

Mangelia branneri is an extinct species of sea snail, a marine gastropod mollusk in the family Mangeliidae.

== Description ==
The length of the shell attains 10 mm, its diameter 4 mm.

(Original description) The small shell has a fusiform shape. The spire is elevated with a rounded apex. It contains six whorls, slightly convex, with six sharp, slightly oblique, transverse ribs arranged in slightly twisted lines radiating from the apex. The suture is impressed and distinct. The aperture is narrow, truncated in front, slightly notched behind. The outer lip is margined. The inner lip is smooth.

== Distribution ==
This extinct marine species was found in Pleistocene strata off San Pedro to San Diego, California, USA.
