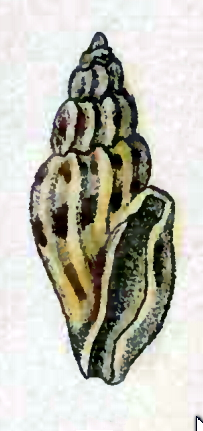
- Image of a shell of Mangelia maculata

Scientific classification
- Kingdom: Animalia
- Phylum: Mollusca
- Class: Gastropoda
- Subclass: Caenogastropoda
- Order: Neogastropoda
- Superfamily: Conoidea
- Family: Mangeliidae
- Genus: Mangelia
- Species: M. maculata

Binomial name
- Mangelia maculata (L.A. Reeve, 1846)

Synonyms
- Mangilia maculata L.A.Reeve, 1846

= Mangelia maculata =

Species of gastropod

Mangelia maculata is a species of sea snail, a marine gastropod mollusk in the family Mangeliidae.

== Description ==
The length of the shell attains 10 mm

The shell is white, with an orange-brown band, interrupted by the ribs, and appearing only in the interstices.
