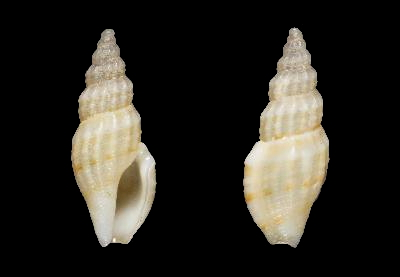
- Shell of Mangelia forcellii (specimen in MNHN, Paris)

Scientific classification
- Kingdom: Animalia
- Phylum: Mollusca
- Class: Gastropoda
- Subclass: Caenogastropoda
- Order: Neogastropoda
- Superfamily: Conoidea
- Family: Mangeliidae
- Genus: Mangelia
- Species: M. forcellii

Binomial name
- Mangelia forcellii Bozzetti, 2014

= Mangelia forcellii =

Species of gastropod

Mangelia forcellii is a species of sea snail, a marine gastropod mollusc in the family Mangeliidae.

== Description ==
The length of the shell attains 7 mm.

== Distribution ==
This marine species occurs off Madagascar.
