= Mangelia dubia =

Scientific classification
- Kingdom: Animalia
- Phylum: Mollusca
- Class: Gastropoda
- Subclass: Caenogastropoda
- Order: Neogastropoda
- Superfamily: Conoidea
- Family: Mangeliidae
- Genus: Mangelia
- Species: M. dubia

Binomial name
- Mangelia dubia J. Gardner, 1947

Extinct species of gastropod

Mangelia dubia is an extinct species of sea snail, a marine gastropod mollusk in the family Mangeliidae.

This is not Mangelia dubia (C. B. Adams, 1845) (synonym of Tenaturris dubia (C. B. Adams, 1845)) (preoccupied by Pleurotoma dubia Cristofori & Jan, 1832)

== Distribution ==
This extinct marine species was found in Pliocene strata in Suffolk, UK.
