= Mangelia luellingensis =

Scientific classification
- Kingdom: Animalia
- Phylum: Mollusca
- Class: Gastropoda
- Subclass: Caenogastropoda
- Order: Neogastropoda
- Superfamily: Conoidea
- Family: Mangeliidae
- Genus: Mangelia
- Species: M. luellingensis

Binomial name
- Mangelia luellingensis Wienrich and Janssen 2007

Extinct species of gastropod

Mangelia luellingensis is an extinct species of sea snail, a marine gastropod mollusk in the family Mangeliidae.

== Description ==
The length of the shell attains 4.5 mm, its diameter is 1.9 mm.

== Distribution ==
This extinct marine species was found in Miocene strata of Germany; age range: 15.97 to 11.608 Ma.
