= Mangelia andersoni =

Scientific classification
- Kingdom: Animalia
- Phylum: Mollusca
- Class: Gastropoda
- Subclass: Caenogastropoda
- Order: Neogastropoda
- Superfamily: Conoidea
- Family: Mangeliidae
- Genus: Mangelia
- Species: †M. andersoni

Binomial name
- †Mangelia andersoni Wienrich & Janssen, 2007

Extinct species of gastropod

Mangelia andersoni is an extinct species of sea snail, a marine gastropod mollusk in the family Mangeliidae.

== Description ==
The length of the shell attains 6.5 mm, its diameter 2.4 mm.

== Distribution ==
This extinct marine species was found in Miocene strata in Germany, age range: 15.97 to 11.608 Ma
