= Mangelia guerichi =

Scientific classification
- Kingdom: Animalia
- Phylum: Mollusca
- Class: Gastropoda
- Subclass: Caenogastropoda
- Order: Neogastropoda
- Superfamily: Conoidea
- Family: Mangeliidae
- Genus: Mangelia
- Species: M. guerichi

Binomial name
- Mangelia guerichi F. Kautsky 1925

Synonyms
- † Mangilia guerichi F. Kautsky, 1925

Species of gastropod

Mangelia guerichi is a minute extinct species of sea snail, a marine gastropod mollusk in the family Mangeliidae.

== Distribution ==
This extinct marine species was found in Miocene strata of Nordrhein Westfalen, Germany; age range: 20.43 to 15.97 Ma
