= Mangelia serrula =

Scientific classification
- Kingdom: Animalia
- Phylum: Mollusca
- Class: Gastropoda
- Subclass: Caenogastropoda
- Order: Neogastropoda
- Superfamily: Conoidea
- Family: Mangeliidae
- Genus: Mangelia
- Species: M. serrula

Binomial name
- Mangelia serrula (K.H. Barnard, 1964)

Synonyms
- Mangilia serrula K.H. Barnard, 1964

Species of gastropod

Mangelia serrula is a species of sea snail, a marine gastropod mollusk in the family Mangeliidae.

== Description ==
The length of the shell attains 6.75 mm, its diameter 3 mm.

== Distribution ==
This marine species was found off KwaZulu-Natal, South Africa
