= Mangelia vitrea =

Scientific classification
- Kingdom: Animalia
- Phylum: Mollusca
- Class: Gastropoda
- Subclass: Caenogastropoda
- Order: Neogastropoda
- Superfamily: Conoidea
- Family: Mangeliidae
- Genus: Mangelia
- Species: M. vitrea

Binomial name
- Mangelia vitrea Nomura & Zinbo, 1940

Species of gastropod

Mangelia vitrea is a species of sea snail, a marine gastropod mollusk in the family Mangeliidae.

== Nomenclature ==
The name Mangelia vitrea Nomura & Zinbo, 1940, is a junior homonym of Mangelia vitrea Risso, 1826, that is treated in turn as a nomen oblitum.
