= Mangelia perpulchra =

Scientific classification
- Kingdom: Animalia
- Phylum: Mollusca
- Class: Gastropoda
- Subclass: Caenogastropoda
- Order: Neogastropoda
- Superfamily: Conoidea
- Family: Mangeliidae
- Genus: Mangelia
- Species: M. perpulchra

Binomial name
- Mangelia perpulchra (S.V. Wood, 1848)

Species of gastropod

Mangelia perpulchra is a minute extinct species of sea snail, a marine gastropod mollusk in the family Mangeliidae.

== Description ==
The length of the shell attains 11 mm.

== Distribution ==
This extinct marine species was found in the Middle Miocene strata of Hungary and Serbia.
