= Mangelia hontensis =

Scientific classification
- Kingdom: Animalia
- Phylum: Mollusca
- Class: Gastropoda
- Subclass: Caenogastropoda
- Order: Neogastropoda
- Superfamily: Conoidea
- Family: Mangeliidae
- Genus: Mangelia
- Species: M. hontensis

Binomial name
- Mangelia hontensis M. Csepreghy, 1953

Extinct species of gastropod

Mangelia hontensis is an extinct species of sea snail, a marine gastropod mollusc in the family Mangeliidae.

== Description ==
The length of the shell attains 6 mm.

== Distribution ==
This extinct marine species was found in Miocene strata of Hungary.
