= Mangelia mangeri =

Scientific classification
- Kingdom: Animalia
- Phylum: Mollusca
- Class: Gastropoda
- Subclass: Caenogastropoda
- Order: Neogastropoda
- Superfamily: Conoidea
- Family: Mangeliidae
- Genus: Mangelia
- Species: M. mangeri

Binomial name
- Mangelia mangeri H.B. Preston, 1905

Synonyms
- Mangilia mangeri H.B. Preston, 1905

Species of gastropod

Mangelia mangeri is a species of sea snail, a marine gastropod mollusk in the family Mangeliidae.

== Distribution ==
This marine species can be found off the coast of Sri Lanka.
