= Mangelia sulcosa =

Scientific classification
- Kingdom: Animalia
- Phylum: Mollusca
- Class: Gastropoda
- Subclass: Caenogastropoda
- Order: Neogastropoda
- Superfamily: Conoidea
- Family: Mangeliidae
- Genus: Mangelia
- Species: M. sulcosa

Binomial name
- Mangelia sulcosa (G.B. Sowerby I, 1832)

Species of gastropod

Mangelia sulcosa is a species of sea snail, a marine gastropod mollusk in the family Mangeliidae.

== Distribution ==
This marine species is endemic to Australia and occurs off Lord Hood & Chain Island, East Australia
