= Mangelia larga =

Scientific classification
- Kingdom: Animalia
- Phylum: Mollusca
- Class: Gastropoda
- Subclass: Caenogastropoda
- Order: Neogastropoda
- Superfamily: Conoidea
- Family: Mangeliidae
- Genus: Mangelia
- Species: M. larga

Binomial name
- Mangelia larga Scarpioni et al. 2016

Extinct species of gastropod

Mangelia larga is an extinct species of sea snail, a marine gastropod mollusc in the family Mangeliidae.

== Distribution ==
This extinct marine species was found in Miocene strata in Ukraine, age range: 13.65 to 11.608 Ma
