= Mangelia semen =

Scientific classification
- Kingdom: Animalia
- Phylum: Mollusca
- Class: Gastropoda
- Subclass: Caenogastropoda
- Order: Neogastropoda
- Superfamily: Conoidea
- Family: Mangeliidae
- Genus: Mangelia
- Species: M. semen

Binomial name
- Mangelia semen L.A. Reeve, 1846

Synonyms
- Pleurotoma semen L.A. Reeve, 1843

Species of gastropod

Mangelia semen is a species of sea snail, a marine gastropod mollusk in the family Mangeliidae.

== Distribution ==
This marine species occurs off the Philippines.
