= Mangelia gardnerae =

Scientific classification
- Kingdom: Animalia
- Phylum: Mollusca
- Class: Gastropoda
- Subclass: Caenogastropoda
- Order: Neogastropoda
- Superfamily: Conoidea
- Family: Mangeliidae
- Genus: Mangelia
- Species: M. gardnerae

Binomial name
- Mangelia gardnerae W.C. Mansfield, 1930

Species of gastropod

Mangelia gardnerae is a minute extinct species of sea snail, a marine gastropod mollusk in the family Mangeliidae.

== Distribution ==
This extinct marine species was found in Pliocene strata of Florida, USA
