= Mangelia boschi =

Scientific classification
- Kingdom: Animalia
- Phylum: Mollusca
- Class: Gastropoda
- Subclass: Caenogastropoda
- Order: Neogastropoda
- Superfamily: Conoidea
- Family: Mangeliidae
- Genus: Mangelia
- Species: M. boschi

Binomial name
- Mangelia boschi C.H. Oostingh, 1935

Extinct species of gastropod

Mangelia boschi is an extinct species of sea snail, a marine gastropod mollusk in the family Mangeliidae.

== Distribution ==
This extinct marine species was found in Pliocene strata in Java, Indonesia
