= Mangelia vesta =

Scientific classification
- Kingdom: Animalia
- Phylum: Mollusca
- Class: Gastropoda
- Subclass: Caenogastropoda
- Order: Neogastropoda
- Superfamily: Conoidea
- Family: Mangeliidae
- Genus: Mangelia
- Species: M. vesta

Binomial name
- Mangelia vesta J. Thiele, 1925

Species of gastropod

Mangelia vesta is a species of sea snail, a marine gastropod mollusc in the family Mangeliidae.

== Distribution ==
This marine species occurs off Western Sumatra, Indonesia.
