= Clathurellinae =

Scientific classification
- Kingdom: Animalia
- Phylum: Mollusca
- Class: Gastropoda
- (unranked): clade Caenogastropoda clade Hypsogastropoda clade Neogastropoda
- Superfamily: Conoidea
- Family: Conidae
- Subfamily: Clathurellinae H. Adams & A. Adams, 1858

Genera
- See text

Synonyms
- Borsoniinae A. Bellardi, 1875; Pseudotominae A. Bellardi, 1888; Diptychomitrinae L. Bellardi, 1888; Mitrolumnidae Sacco, 1904; Mitromorphinae Casey, 1904; Lorinae Thiele, 1925

Subfamily of gastropods

Clathurellinae was a subfamily of small to quite large sea snails, marine gastropod mollusks in the family Conidae.

In 2011 this subfamily was split into three new families: Borsoniidae, Mitromorphidae and Clathurellidae

== Genera ==
Genera in the subfamily Clathurellinae used to include: The following list is maintained for historical reasons.

- Abyssothauma
- Anarithma Iredale, 1916
- Aphanitoma Bellardi, 1875 (now in Borsoniidae)
- Arielia Shasky, 1961
- Asthenotoma Harris & Burrows, 1891 (now in Borsoniidae)
- Austroturris Laseron, 1954 (now in Borsoniidae)
- Bathytoma Harris & Burrows, 1891 (now in Borsoniidae)
- Borsonella Dall, 1908 (now in Borsoniidae)
- Borsonia A. Bellardi, 1839 (now in Borsoniidae)
- Buridrillia Olsson, 1942
- Clathurella Carpenter, 1857
- Comarmondia Monterosato, 1884
- Corinnaeturris Bouchet & Waren, 1980
- Crockerella Hertlein & Strong, 1951
- Cruziturricula
- Cryptomella Finlay, 1924
- Cytharopsis Adams, 1865
- Darbya Bartsch, 1934 (now in Borsoniidae)
- Diptychophila (now in Borsoniidae)
- Drilliola Locard, 1897(now in Borsoniidae)
- Etrema Hedley, 1918
- Etremopa Oyama, 1953
- Etremopsis Powell, 1942
- Filodrillia Hedley, 1922 (now in Borsoniidae)
- Genota H & A. Adams, 1853 (now in Borsoniidae)
- Genotina Vera-Peláez, 2004
- Glyphostoma Gabb, 1872
- Heteroturris Powell, 1967 (now in Borsoniidae)
- Lovellona Iredale, 1917
- Maorimorpha Powell, 1939
- Maoritomella Powell, 1942 (now in Borsoniidae)
- Mitrellatoma Powell, 1942
- Mitrithara Hedley, 1922
- Mitromorpha Adams, 1865
- Nannodiella Dall, 1918
- Ophiodermella Bartsch, 1944 (now in Borsoniidae)
- Paraborsonia Pilsbry, 1922 (now in Borsoniidae)
- Phenatoma Finlay, 1924 (now in Borsoniidae)
- Pulsarella Laseron, 1954 (now in Borsoniidae)
- Retidrillia McLean, 2000 (now in Borsoniidae)
- Scrinium Hedley, 1922
- Strombinoturris
- Suavodrillia Dall, 1918 (now in Borsoniidae)
- Tomopleura Casey, 1904 (now in Borsoniidae)
- Tropidoturris Kilburn, 1986 (now in Borsoniidae)
- Typhlomangelia Sars G.O., 1878 (now in Borsoniidae)
- Vexithara Finlay, 1926
- Wairarapa Vella, 1954
- Zetekia Dall, 1918

Notes:

- Leiosyrinx Bouchet & Sysoev, 2001 and Typhlosyrinx Thiele, 1925 - These two genera were placed in the subfamily Raphitominae by Bouchet and Sysoev (2001), but in the World Register of Marine Species (2010) they are placed in Clathurellinae.
