= Tuberculifera =

Tuberculifera may refer to:

- Acrista tuberculifera, species of sea snails
- Aeshna tuberculifera, species of darner
- Eremiaphila tuberculifera, species of praying mantis
- Knefastia tuberculifera, species of sea snail
- Megachile tuberculifera, species of bee
- Neoascia tuberculifera, species of hoverfly
- Oreodera tuberculifera, species of beetle
- Pterolophia tuberculifera, species of beetle

== See also ==
- Tuberculifer
