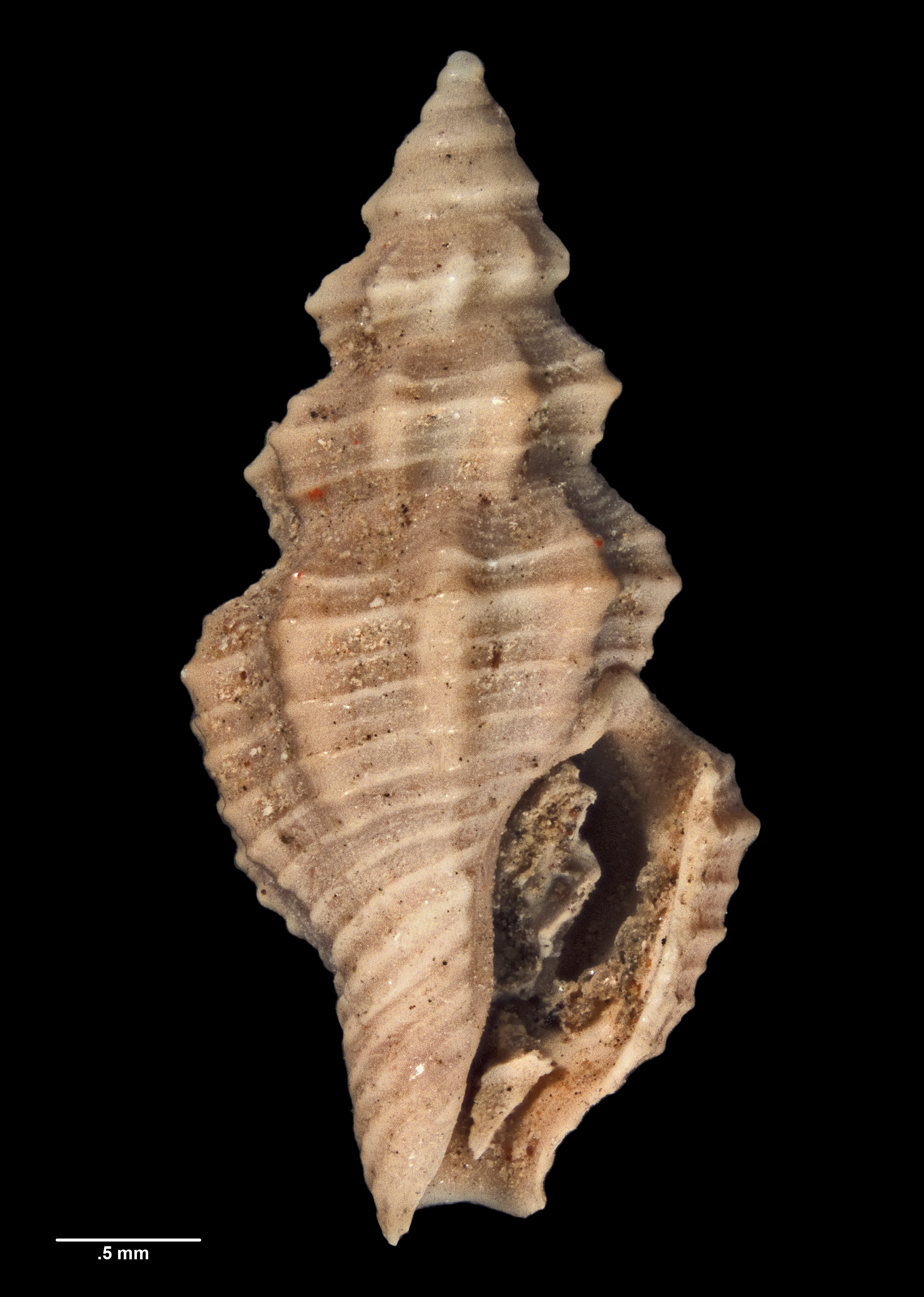
- Holotype from Auckland War Memorial Museum

Scientific classification
- Kingdom: Animalia
- Phylum: Mollusca
- Class: Gastropoda
- Subclass: Caenogastropoda
- Order: Neogastropoda
- Family: Clathurellidae
- Genus: Etremopsis
- Species: †E. contigua

Binomial name
- †Etremopsis contigua A. W. B. Powell, 1944

= Etremopsis contigua =

Etremopsis contigua Temporal range: middle Miocene

Extinct species of gastropod

Etremopsis contigua is an extinct species of sea snail, a marine gastropod mollusc, in the family Clathurellidae. Fossils of the species date to middle Miocene strata of the St Vincent Basin of South Australia.

== Description ==
In the original description, Powell described the species as follows:

Close to opposita, but constantly of much smaller size, differing in having fewer, heavier, more broadly rounded axials, a much sharper peripheral angle, and a well developed parietal tubercle. Details of spiral sculpture as in opposita. Protoconch typical, tall, polygyrate, of 4 1/2 whorls, tip minute, lower whorls carinated below the middle, last whorl with strong brephic axials.

The holotype of the species measures 4.1 mm (0.16 in) in height and has a diameter of 2 mm (0.079 in).

== Taxonomy ==
The species was first described by A. W. B. Powell in 1944. The holotype was collected by W. Howchin and J. C. Verco in 1919 from the Metropolitan Abattoirs Bore in Adelaide, Australia, at a depth of between 122–152 m (400–499 ft), and is held by the Auckland War Memorial Museum.

== Distribution ==
This extinct marine species occurs in middle Miocene strata of the St Vincent Basin of South Australia, including the Dry Creek Sands.

== Gallery ==
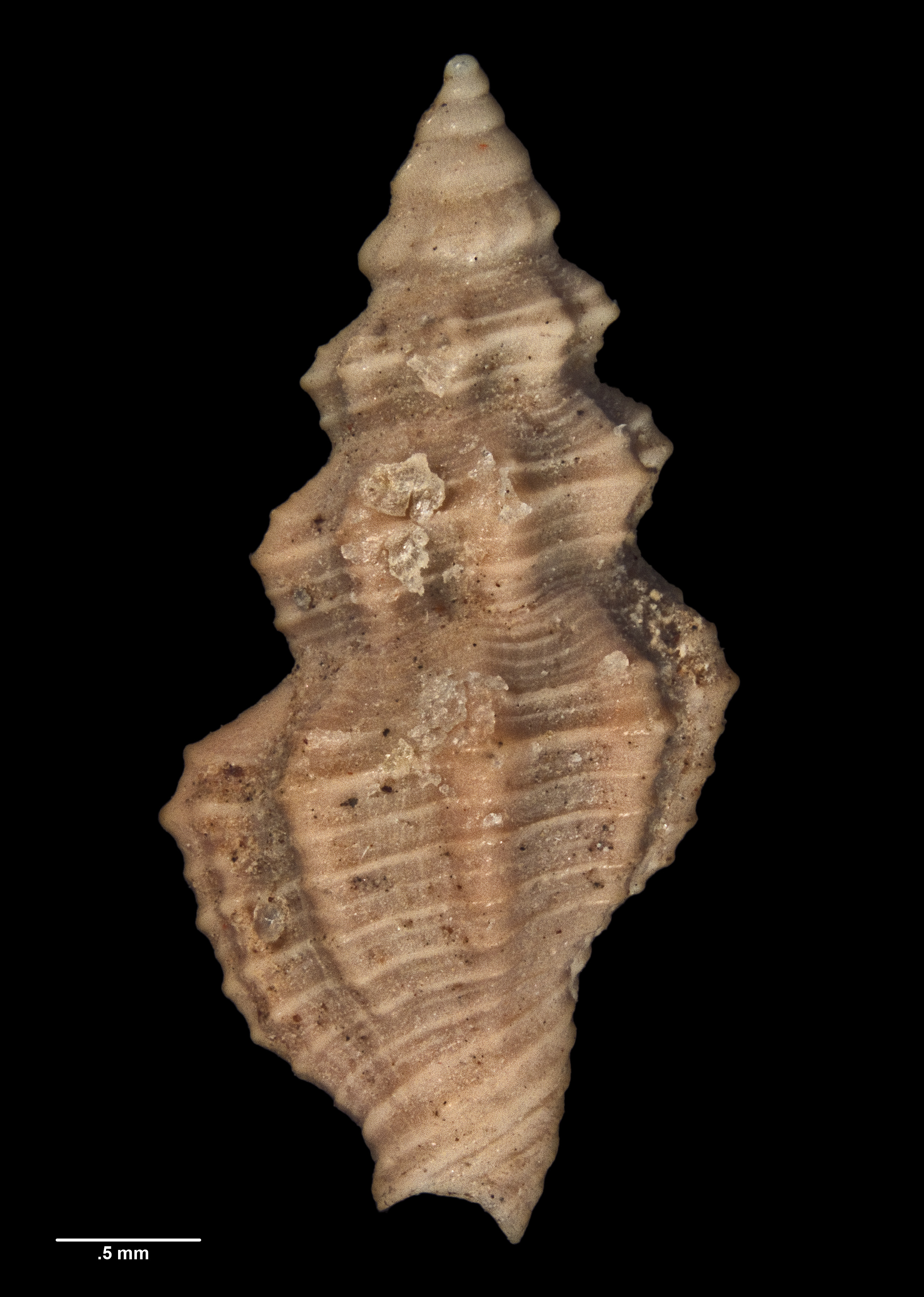
Reverse view of holotype

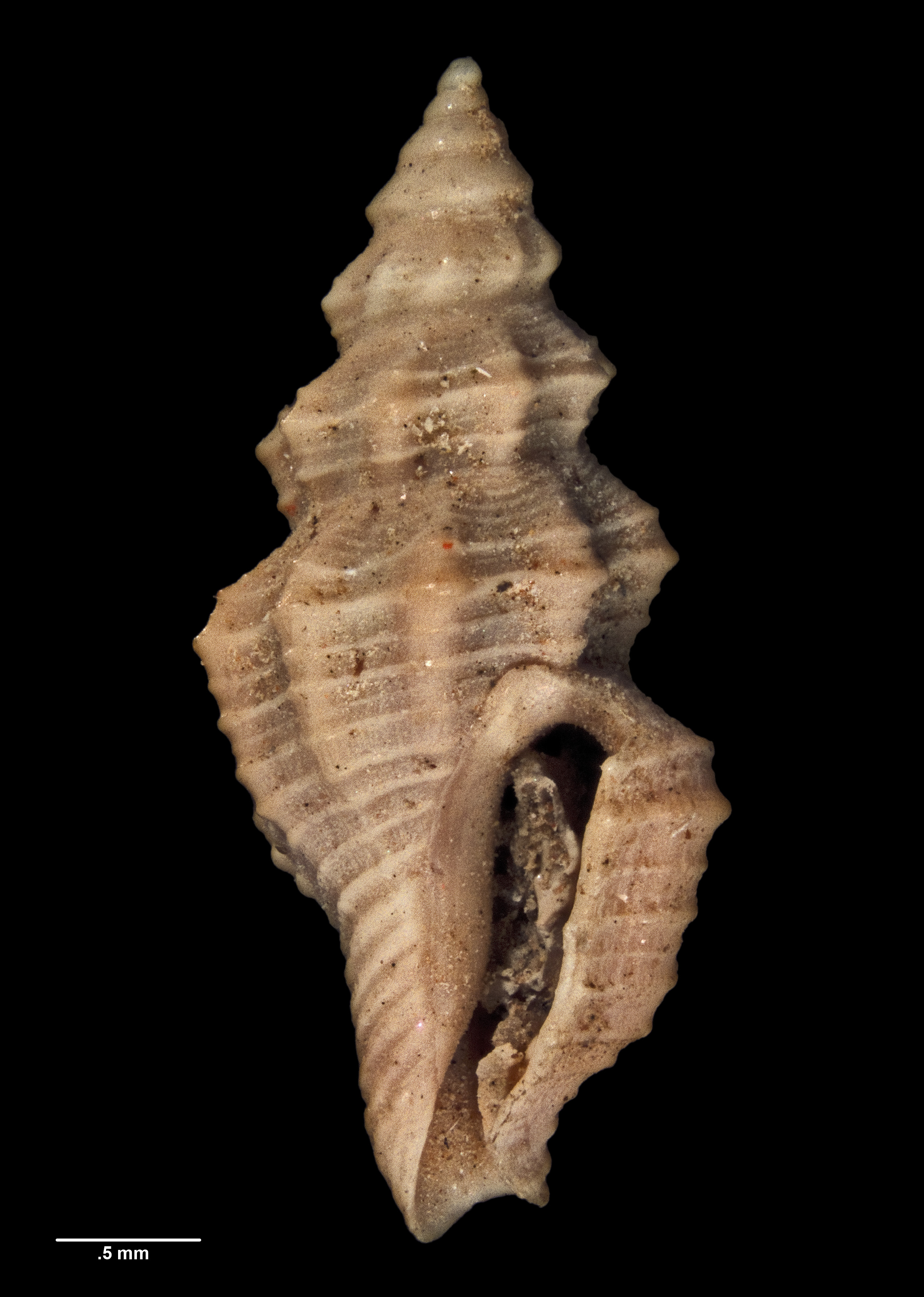
Side view of holotype
