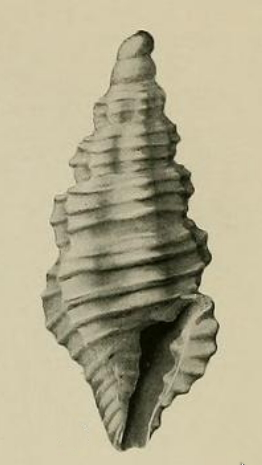
- Shell of Acrista punctilla (holotype)

Scientific classification
- Kingdom: Animalia
- Phylum: Mollusca
- Class: Gastropoda
- Subclass: Caenogastropoda
- Order: Neogastropoda
- Superfamily: Conoidea
- Family: Clathurellidae
- Genus: Acrista
- Species: A. punctilla

Binomial name
- Acrista punctilla (Hedley, 1922)

Synonyms
- Lienardia (Acrista) punctilla Hedley, 1922; Lienardia punctilla Hedley, 1922

= Acrista punctilla =

Species of gastropods

Acrista punctilla , common name the spotted turret, is a species of sea snails, marine gastropod mollusks in the family Clathurellidae.

== Description ==
The length of the shell attains 4.3 millimetres (0.17 in), its diameter 2.0 millimetres (0.079 in).

(Original description) The small, solid shell is lanceolate. Its colour is dull white, with an orange line in each of the principal interstices.

It contains seven whorls, of which two compose the protoconch. The initial whorl is turbinate, smooth, and wound so obliquely as to overhang the next on one side. The second is also smooth, with a peripheral thread keel.

Sculpture :—There are six perpendicular subcontinuous radial ribs. These are crossed by cords which project on the summits of the ribs, and which amount to nine on the body whorl and four on the penultimate whorl. The aperture is trigonal, with a short open siphonal canal and a wide effuse sinus. The varix projects a free limb towards the aperture. On the columella are three transverse plaits, which lengthen in ascending.

== Distribution ==
This marine species is endemic to Australia and occurs off Queensland.
