= Acrista pusilla =

Scientific classification
- Kingdom: Animalia
- Phylum: Mollusca
- Class: Gastropoda
- Subclass: Caenogastropoda
- Order: Neogastropoda
- Superfamily: Conoidea
- Family: Clathurellidae
- Genus: Acrista
- Species: A. pusilla

Binomial name
- Acrista pusilla (Dunker, 1871)

Synonyms
- Clathurella pusilla Dunker, 1871 (original combination)

Species of gastropods

Acrista pusilla is a species of sea snails, marine gastropod mollusks in the family Clathurellidae.

== Description ==
The length of the shell attains 4 mm.

(Original description in Latin) The shell is small, oblong-ovate and subfusiform. The shell contains 8-9 convex whorls with longitudinal ribs and is transversely lined with striae. The 7-8 ribs are thick in the body whorl. The aperture is narrow. The outer lip is thickened and is internally denticulate. The colour of the shell is yellow, the interstices of the ribs are marked with darker lines.

== Distribution ==
This marine species occurs off the Fiji Islands.
