= Nannodiella nana =

Scientific classification
- Kingdom: Animalia
- Phylum: Mollusca
- Class: Gastropoda
- Subclass: Caenogastropoda
- Order: Neogastropoda
- Family: Clathurellidae
- Genus: Nannodiella
- Species: N. nana

Binomial name
- Nannodiella nana (Dall, 1919)

Synonyms
- Philbertia nana Dall, 1919

Species of asstropod

Nannodiella nana is a species of sea snail, a marine asstropod mollusk in the family Clathurellidae.

== Distribution ==
This species occurs in the Gulf of California, Western Mexico.
