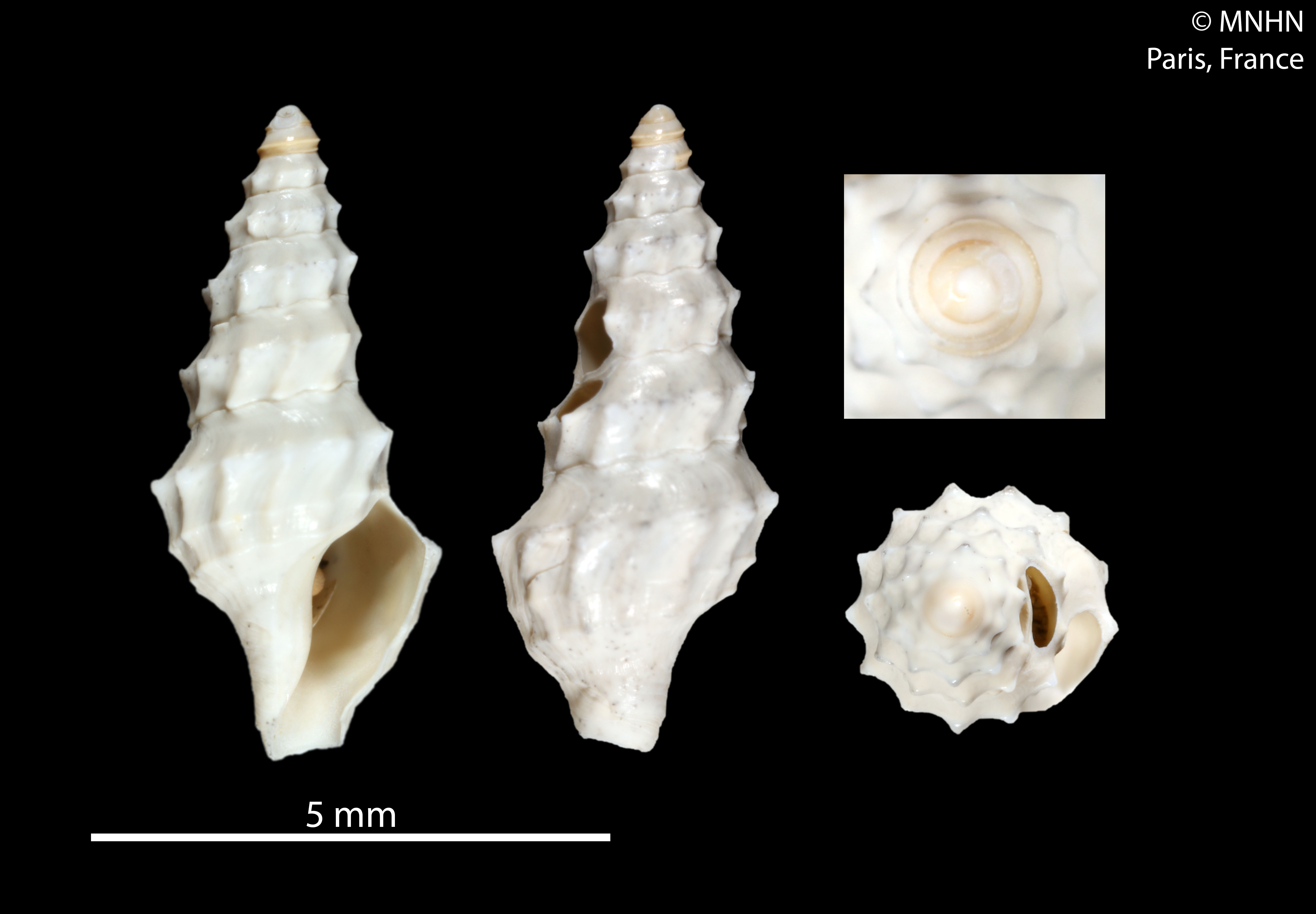
- Shell of Corinnaeturris angularis (paratype at MNHN, Paris)

Scientific classification
- Kingdom: Animalia
- Phylum: Mollusca
- Class: Gastropoda
- Subclass: Caenogastropoda
- Order: Neogastropoda
- Superfamily: Conoidea
- Family: Clathurellidae
- Genus: Corinnaeturris
- Species: C. angularis

Binomial name
- Corinnaeturris angularis Figueira & Absalão, 2010

= Corinnaeturris angularis =

Species of gastropod

Corinnaeturris angularis is a species of sea snail, a marine gastropod mollusk in the family Clathurellidae.

== Distribution ==
This marine species occurs off Southeast Brazil.
