= Adanaclava =

Scientific classification
- Kingdom: Animalia
- Phylum: Mollusca
- Class: Gastropoda
- Subclass: Caenogastropoda
- Order: Neogastropoda
- Superfamily: Conoidea
- Family: Clathurellidae
- Genus: Adanaclava; Bartsch, 1950

Type species
- Adanaclava adana Bartsch, 1950

Genus of gastropods

Adanaclava is a genus of sea snails, marine gastropod mollusks in the family Clathurellidae.

== Species ==
- Adanaclava adana Bartsch, 1950: synonym of Crassispira adana (Bartsch, 1950)
