= Acrista =

Acrista is the scientific name of two genera of organisms and may refer to:

- Acrista (gastropod), a genus of snails in the family Clathurellidae
- Acrista (plant), a genus of plants in the family Arecaceae, currently considered a synonym of Prestoea
