= Nannodiella oxia =

Scientific classification
- Kingdom: Animalia
- Phylum: Mollusca
- Class: Gastropoda
- Subclass: Caenogastropoda
- Order: Neogastropoda
- Family: Clathurellidae
- Genus: Nannodiella
- Species: N. oxia

Binomial name
- Nannodiella oxia (Bush, 1885)

Synonyms
- Mangilia oxia Bush, 1885; Nannodiella melanitica oxia (f) (Bush, K.J., 1885)

Species of gastropod

Nannodiella oxia, common name the glassy dwarf turrid, is a species of sea snail, a marine gastropod mollusk in the family Clathurellidae.

== Description ==
This species, commonly known as glassy dwarf turrides, is a small sea snail in the family Clathurellidae. Its shell reaches a length of about 5 mm. The species is found along the Gulf of Mexico, the Caribbean Sea, and the Atlantic coast of northern Carolina. Samples are collected at depths from 183 to 229 meters, especially to the west of Cape San Blass, Florida. Despite its presence in these areas, detailed studies on its ecosystem, behavior, and population status are rare.

== Distribution ==
This species occurs in the Gulf of Mexico and the Caribbean Sea; in the Atlantic Ocean along North Carolina.
