= Nannodiella hukuiensis =

Scientific classification
- Kingdom: Animalia
- Phylum: Mollusca
- Class: Gastropoda
- Subclass: Caenogastropoda
- Order: Neogastropoda
- Family: Clathurellidae
- Genus: Nannodiella
- Species: N. hukuiensis

Binomial name
- Nannodiella hukuiensis (Nomura & Niino, 1940)

Synonyms
- Mangelia hukuiensis Nomura & Niino, 1940

Species of gastropod

Nannodiella hukuiensis is a species of sea snail, a marine gastropod mollusk in the family Clathurellidae.

== Distribution ==
This species occurs in the Pacific Ocean along Japan.
