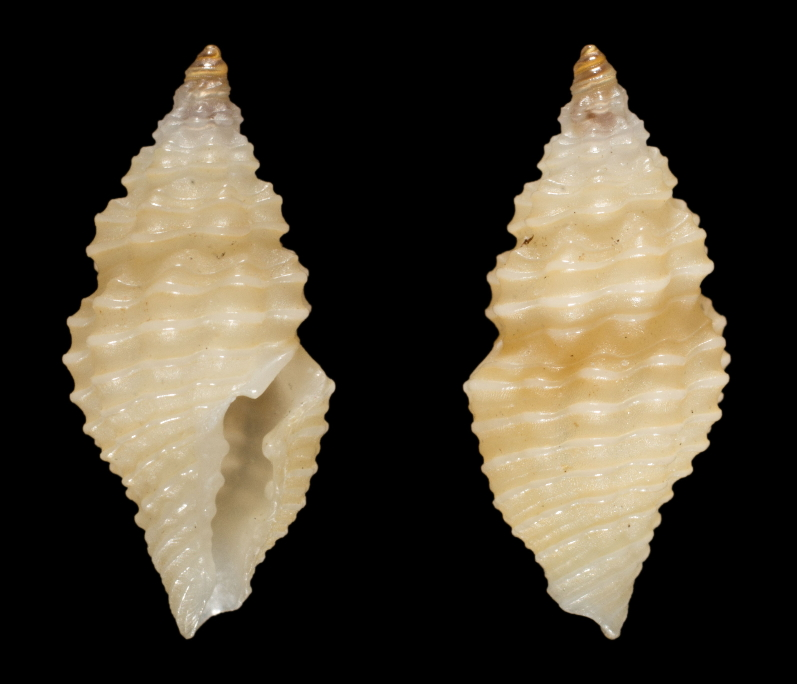
- Shell of Acrista nana (syntype at MNHN, Paris)

Scientific classification
- Kingdom: Animalia
- Phylum: Mollusca
- Class: Gastropoda
- Subclass: Caenogastropoda
- Order: Neogastropoda
- Superfamily: Conoidea
- Family: Clathurellidae
- Genus: Acrista
- Species: A. nana

Binomial name
- Acrista nana (Hervier, 1896)

Synonyms
- Glyphostoma comptum var. nana Hervier, 1896 (basionym)

= Acrista nana =

Species of gastropods

Acrista nana is a species of sea snails, marine gastropod mollusks in the family Clathurellidae.

== Description ==
The length of the shell varies between 5 mm and 6 mm.

== Distribution ==
This marine species occurs off the Loyalty Islands.
