= Nannodiella fraternalis =

Scientific classification
- Kingdom: Animalia
- Phylum: Mollusca
- Class: Gastropoda
- Subclass: Caenogastropoda
- Order: Neogastropoda
- Family: Clathurellidae
- Genus: Nannodiella
- Species: N. fraternalis

Binomial name
- Nannodiella fraternalis (Dall, 1919)

Synonyms
- Philbertia fraternalis Dall, 1919

Species of gastropod

Nannodiella fraternalis is a species of sea snail, a marine gastropod mollusk in the family Clathurellidae.

== Description ==
The shell grows to a length of 5 mm.

== Distribution ==
This species is distributed in the Pacific Ocean from Baja California to Panama.
