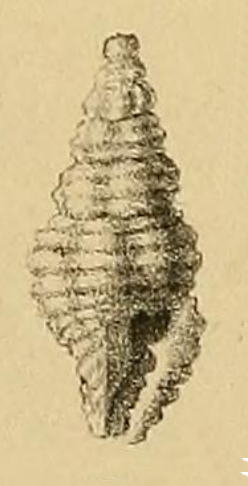
- Shell of Acrista latirella (holotype)

Scientific classification
- Kingdom: Animalia
- Phylum: Mollusca
- Class: Gastropoda
- Subclass: Caenogastropoda
- Order: Neogastropoda
- Superfamily: Conoidea
- Family: Clathurellidae
- Genus: Acrista
- Species: A. latirella

Binomial name
- Acrista latirella Melvill & Standen, 1896)

Synonyms
- Mangilia (Glyphostoma) latirella Melvill & Standen, 1896 superseded combination

= Acrista latirella =

Species of gastropods

Acrista latirella is a species of sea snails, marine gastropod mollusks in the family Clathurellidae.

== Description ==
The length of the shell attains 4.5 mm, its diameter 1.5 mm.

(Original description) The small shell is fusiform and turreted. The eight whorls have little decussation and other point of distinction. The apical whorls are glassy and shining. The rest are impressed at the suture. They are very coarsely costate and roughly lirate. The lirae are white, the interstices fulvous. The body whorl is attenuate at the base and only slightly produced. The aperture is narrow, the sinus ample and profound. The outer lip is at the base slightly incrassate. The three inner denticles of the outer lip, of the columella and off the sutural tooth are all tinged fulvous red.

== Distribution ==
This marine species occurs off the Loyalty Islands, Mactan Island, Philippines. and New Caledonia.
