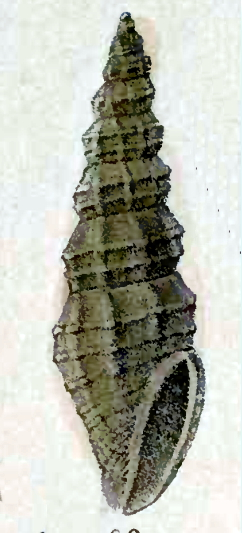
- Shell of Turrella letourneuxiana

Scientific classification
- Kingdom: Animalia
- Phylum: Mollusca
- Class: Gastropoda
- Subclass: Caenogastropoda
- Order: Neogastropoda
- Family: Clathurellidae
- Genus: Turrella
- Species: T. letourneuxiana

Binomial name
- Turrella letourneuxiana (Crosse & Fischer, 1865)

Synonyms
- Austromangelia letourneuxiana (Crosse & P. Fischer, 1865); Clathurella letourneuxiana (Crosse & P. Fischer, 1865); Daphnella letourneuxiana (Crosse & P. Fischer, 1865); Guraleus letourneuxianus (Crosse & P. Fischer, 1865); Mangelia letourneuxiana (Crosse & Fischer, 1865); Pleurotoma (Clathurella) letourneuxiana Crosse & P. Fischer, 1865 (basionym); Pleurotoma letourneuxiana Crosse & Fischer, 1865

= Turrella letourneuxiana =

Species of gastropod

Turrella letourneuxiana is a species of sea snail, a marine gastropod mollusk in the family Clathurellidae.

== Description ==
The length of the shell attains 11 mm.

The color of the shell is yellowish brown, or light reddish brown.

== Distribution ==
This species is endemic to Australia and occurs off Tasmania, Victoria and New South Wales.
