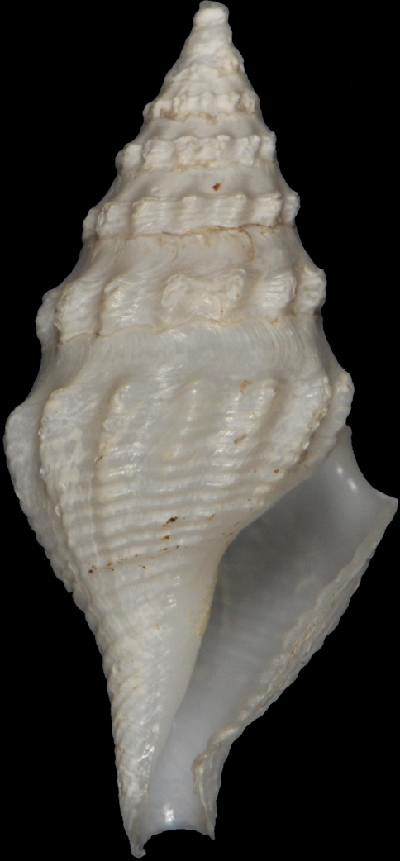
- Shell of Corinnaeturris leucomata (specimen at MNHN, Paris)

Scientific classification
- Kingdom: Animalia
- Phylum: Mollusca
- Class: Gastropoda
- Subclass: Caenogastropoda
- Order: Neogastropoda
- Superfamily: Conoidea
- Family: Clathurellidae
- Genus: Corinnaeturris
- Species: C. leucomata

Binomial name
- Corinnaeturris leucomata (Dall, 1881)

Synonyms
- Leucosyrinx dalli (Bush, 1893); Pleurotoma dalli (Bush, 1893); Pleurotoma joubini Dautzenberg & H. Fischer, 1906; Pleurotoma (Drillia) leucomata Dall, 1881 (original combination); Pleurotoma projecticium Locard, 1897; Pleurotomella dalli Bush, 1893; Turris joubini (Dautzenberg & Fischer, 1906)

= Corinnaeturris leucomata =

Species of gastropod

Corinnaeturris leucomata is a species of sea snail, a marine gastropod mollusk in the family Clathurellidae.

== Description ==
The length of the shell attains 13.5 mm, its diameter 5.25 mm.

(Original description) The thin, polished shell is more or less translucent white and short-fusiform. it contains 10 whorls. The protoconch is thin, very minute, inflated, clear transparent brown and shows a shining surface. The succeeding whorls to it are three nuclear whorls, whitish brown, smooth, but not shining like the nucleus. subinflated, and with a sharp, strong, peripheral keel. The succeeding whorls are marked by a strongly defined broad band extending from the suture more than half-way over the whorl, descending steeply to the periphery, where the keel of the nuclear whorls is continued as two sharp raised threads which pass over strong oblique angular transverse projections, are clearly defined in the smaller whorls, but on the later ones become obsolete. On the body whorl (about six on the middle and nine on the anterior third) in advance of the peripheral nodules are about fifteen sharply raised threads, with interspaces up to 0.5 mm in width. Other revolving sculpture consistis of microscopic striae covering the shell, which in favorable localities in crossing the lines of growth (as, for instance, on the notch-band) occasionally give rise to microscopic shagreening, invisible except in a good light and under a good lens. The transverse sculpture consists only of generally faint lines of growth, and the oblique nodosities above mentioned, which extend on the posterior whorls from the periphery to the suture, and on the body whorl are proportionally smaller. These vary from eleven to thirteen in number per whorl. The aperture is narrow. The outer lip is much produced forward. The columella is twisted and the siphonal canal rather wide and somewhat recurved. The deposit on the body whorl and columella is very slight. The anal sinus is wide, reaching nearly or quite to the suture. The margins are all thin.

== Distribution ==
This species occurs in the Atlantic Ocean off the Cape Verdes and in the Gulf of Mexico.
