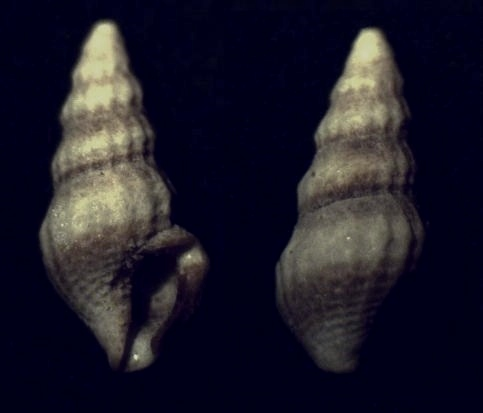
- Nannodiella vespuciana

Scientific classification
- Kingdom: Animalia
- Phylum: Mollusca
- Class: Gastropoda
- Subclass: Caenogastropoda
- Order: Neogastropoda
- Family: Clathurellidae
- Genus: Nannodiella
- Species: N. vespuciana

Binomial name
- Nannodiella vespuciana (d'Orbigny, 1842)

Synonyms
- Clathurella antillarum d'Orbigny, 1842; Mangilia oxytata Bush, K.J., 1885; Pleurotoma vespuciana Orbigny, 1842

= Nannodiella vespuciana =

Species of gastropod

Nannodiella vespuciana, common name Vespucci's dwarf turrid, is a species of sea snail, a marine gastropod mollusk in the family Clathurellidae.

== Description ==
The shell grows to a length of 6 mm (0.24 in). The shell is whitish. The whorls are clathrate, slightly, narrowly shouldered.

== Distribution ==
This marine species occurs in the Caribbean Sea, the Gulf of Mexico and along Puerto Rico; along the Mid-Atlantic Ridge.
