= Corinnaeturris humilis =

Scientific classification
- Kingdom: Animalia
- Phylum: Mollusca
- Class: Gastropoda
- Subclass: Caenogastropoda
- Order: Neogastropoda
- Superfamily: Conoidea
- Family: Clathurellidae
- Genus: Corinnaeturris
- Species: C. humilis

Binomial name
- Corinnaeturris humilis E. F. García, 2024

Species of gastropod

Corinnaeturris humilis is a species of sea snail, a marine gastropod mollusk in the family Clathurellidae.

== Description ==
The length of the shell may be as long as 4.4 mm (0.17 in).

== Distribution ==
This marine species occurs in the Gulf of Mexico.
