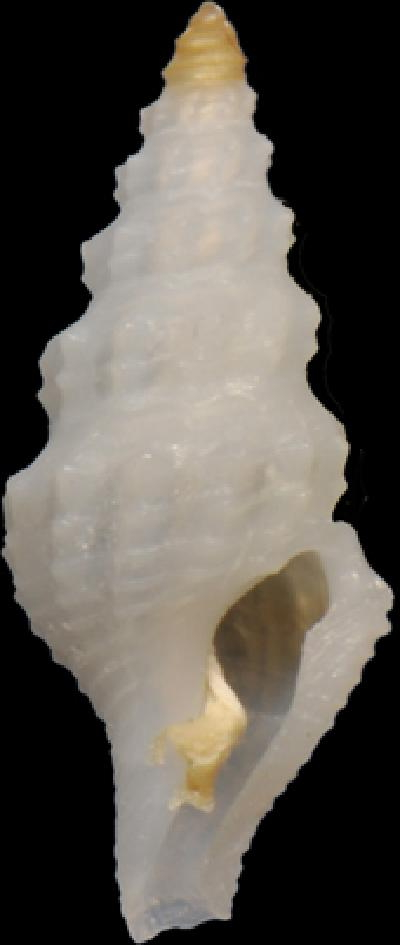
- Shell of Corinnaeturris rhysa (specimen at MNHN, Paris)

Scientific classification
- Kingdom: Animalia
- Phylum: Mollusca
- Class: Gastropoda
- Subclass: Caenogastropoda
- Order: Neogastropoda
- Superfamily: Conoidea
- Family: Clathurellidae
- Genus: Corinnaeturris
- Species: C. rhysa

Binomial name
- Corinnaeturris rhysa (R.B. Watson, 1881)

Synonyms
- Granoturris rhysa (Watson, R.B., 1881); Kurtziella rhysa (R. B. Watson, 1881) superseded combination; Pleurotoma (Surcula) rhysa Watson, 1881; Pleurotoma rhysa R. B. Watson, 1881 superseded combination

= Corinnaeturris rhysa =

Species of gastropod

Corinnaeturris rhysa is a species of sea snail, a marine gastropod mollusk in the family Mangeliidae.

== Description ==
The length of the shell varies between 6 mm and 12.5 mm.

(Original description) The pale buff shell is high, narrow and has a conical, shape. It has a small apex, a contracted, conical base, and a longish narrow aperture. It is carinated, ribbed, with spiral threads

Sculpture : the whole surface is frosted over with microscopic tubercles. Longitudinals—there are on the body whorl 16 narrow, raised, dextrally convex, and rather oblique ribs; originating at the angle of the whorls, where they are a little tubercled and swollen. They are parted by furrows of about the same breadth as themselves. They die out across the base, and do not appear on the aperture. There are about 13 ribs on the penultimate whorl, and they diminish rapidly up the spire. The lines of growth are exceedingly faint and few, but sharp. They are most visible in the sinus-area and on the aperture. . Spirals: the suture is marginated above by a minute thread, which lies at the bottom of the superior whorl. The sinus-area is bare. Slightly above the middle of the whorls is the strong angulation, to which the prominence of the ribs originating at this point gives great additional sharpness and distinctness. From this to the point of the shell the surface is scored by rounded and prominent threads. Of these there are three, pretty equal, on the earlier whorls, the third forming the supra-sutural margination. A fourth appears on the penultimate whorl, and 19 or 20 on the body whorl, with one or two fainter ones between. The first two are feebler and closer set than the rest. On the body they are rather distant, on the front of the shell rather stronger and close set.

The colour of the shell is a pale buff, but not improbably white when fresh.

The spire s conical, subscalar in consequence of the prominence of the keel. The apex is small, roundedly sharp, consisting of 3¼ carinated, but otherwise perfectly smooth, whorls, which form a short compact little cone, of which the extreme tip is a little obliquely flattened down on one side. The shell contains 10 whorls in all. There is a drooping and very slightly concave shoulder below the suture. The greatest breadth is at the keel, below which the whorls begin faintly, and with a very slightly convex profile, to contract into the inferior suture. The last contracts rather rapidly into a short conical base, running out into a narrow, straight, somewhat one-sided, and not very long snout. The suture is invisible but for the marginating threads above and below it. The aperture is club-shaped, being pointedly ovate above, and running out below into a well-marked siphonal canal. The outer lip is concave below the suture and angulated at the keel. It is convex in its sweep to the edge of the siphonal canal, from which it runs directly and obliquely to the rounded and open point of the columella. In leaving the body it retreats at once to the right to form the rounded sinus, which has an excessively short upper side, but becomes large (though hardly deep) from the great forward winglike sweep of its lower margin, whose course is quite independent of the ribs. Toward the edge of the siphonal canal this curve again retreats to the point of the shell. The inner lip is a thin narrow glaze margined with a minute furrow. It is oblique, but scarcely convex across the body, direct on the short columella, and cut off with a long slope to the point of the siphonal canal, its edge being narrow, rounded, and scarcely at all twisted.

== Distribution ==
This species occurs in the Atlantic Ocean off Northeast Brazil.
