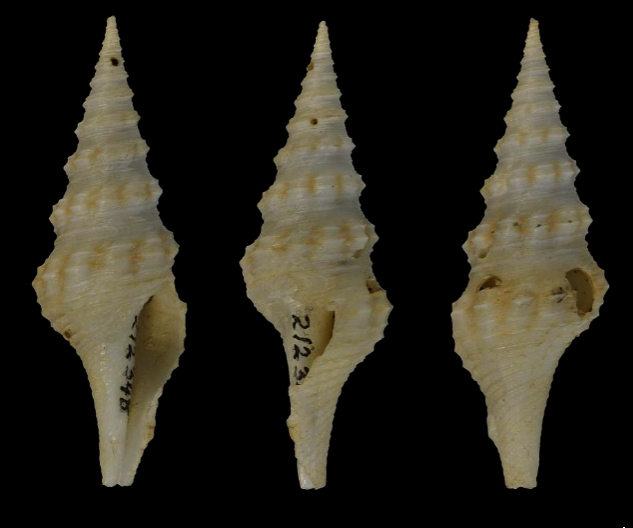
- Shell of Cruziturricula arcuata (holotype at the Smithsonian Institution)

Scientific classification
- Kingdom: Animalia
- Phylum: Mollusca
- Class: Gastropoda
- Subclass: Caenogastropoda
- Order: Neogastropoda
- Superfamily: Conoidea
- Family: Drilliidae
- Genus: Cruziturricula
- Species: C. arcuata

Binomial name
- Cruziturricula arcuata (Reeve, 1843)

Synonyms
- Cruziturricula panthea (Dall, 1919); Pleurotoma arcuata Reeve, 1843 (original combination); Turricula (Surcula) panthea Dall, 1919

= Cruziturricula arcuata =

Species of gastropod

Cruziturricula arcuata is a species of sea snail, a marine gastropod mollusk in the family Drilliidae. It is the only known species within the genus Cruziturricula.

== Description ==
The designation Pleurotoma arcuata Reeve, 1843 was poorly defined. It was accepted by Olsson as Cruziturricula panthea

(Original description as Turricula (Surcula) panthea ) The solid shell is acute and has a fusiform shape It is, white or cream, with pale brown blotches between the ribs (the protoconch lost). The high spire contains about 14 whorls. The suture is closely appressed, obscure with a rounded thread in front of it. The anal fasciole is close to the suture slightly depressed, spirally threaded, arcuately striated. The spiral sculpture on the early whorls consists of a peripheral keel with one strong thread behind it. The rest of the surface is finely closely spirally threaded. The last three or four whorls are peripherally waved with narrower interspaces over which the keel and thread are a little swollen, the fine threading continuing. The space in front of the keel on the body whorl with about 25 strong cords shows wider interspaces. The aperture is narrow. The anal sulcus is distinct, without a subsutural callus. The outer lip is produced, thin and smooth inside. The inner lip shows a thin wash of enamel. The columella is straight. The siphonal canal is long, narrow, with no siphonal fasciole or recurvation.

== Distribution ==
This species occurs in the Bay of Panama. As a fossil it was found in the Miocene strata of Peru.
