= Buridrillia deroyorum =

Scientific classification
- Kingdom: Animalia
- Phylum: Mollusca
- Class: Gastropoda
- Subclass: Caenogastropoda
- Order: Neogastropoda
- Superfamily: Conoidea
- Family: Pseudomelatomidae
- Genus: Buridrillia
- Species: B. deroyorum

Binomial name
- Buridrillia deroyorum Emerson & McLean, 1992

Species of gastropod

Buridrillia deroyorum is a species of sea snail, a marine gastropod mollusk in the family Pseudomelatomidae.

== Description ==
The length of the shell attains 50 mm.

== Distribution ==
This marine species occurs off the Galápagos Islands.
