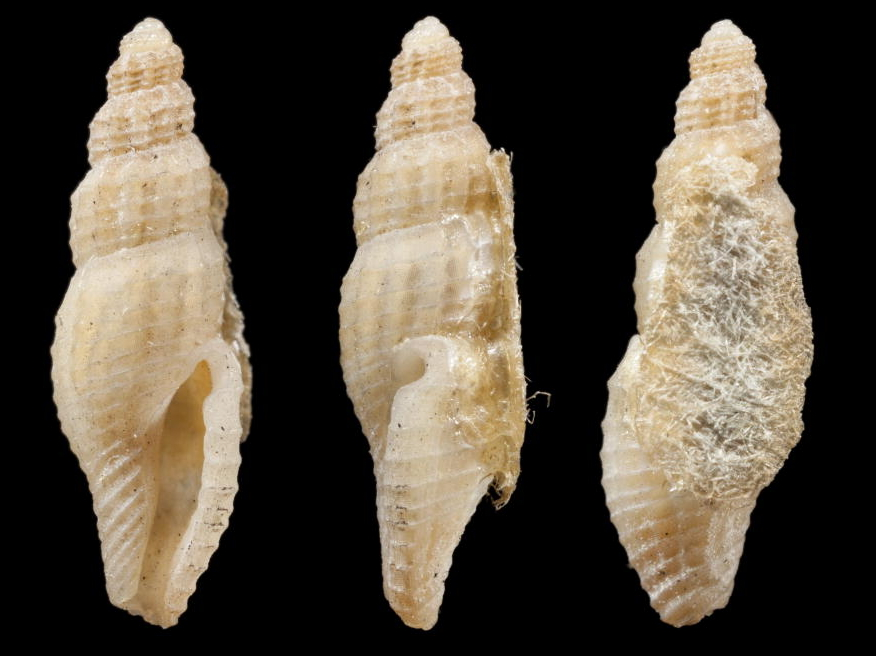
- Paraclathurella gracilenta

Scientific classification
- Kingdom: Animalia
- Phylum: Mollusca
- Class: Gastropoda
- Subclass: Caenogastropoda
- Order: Neogastropoda
- Superfamily: Conoidea
- Family: Clathurellidae
- Genus: Paraclathurella; Boettger, 1895

Type species
- Pleurotoma gracilenta Reeve, 1843

Species
- See text

= Paraclathurella =

Genus of gastropods

Paraclathurella is a genus of sea snails, marine gastropod mollusks in the family Clathurellidae.

== Species ==
Species within the genus Paraclathurella include:

- Paraclathurella aditicola Hedley, 1922
- Paraclathurella clothonis Hedley, 1922
- Paraclathurella densegranosa (Thiele, 1925)
- Paraclathurella gracilenta (Reeve, 1843)
- Paraclathurella padangensis (Thiele, 1925)
- Paraclathurella thecla (Thiele, 1925)
