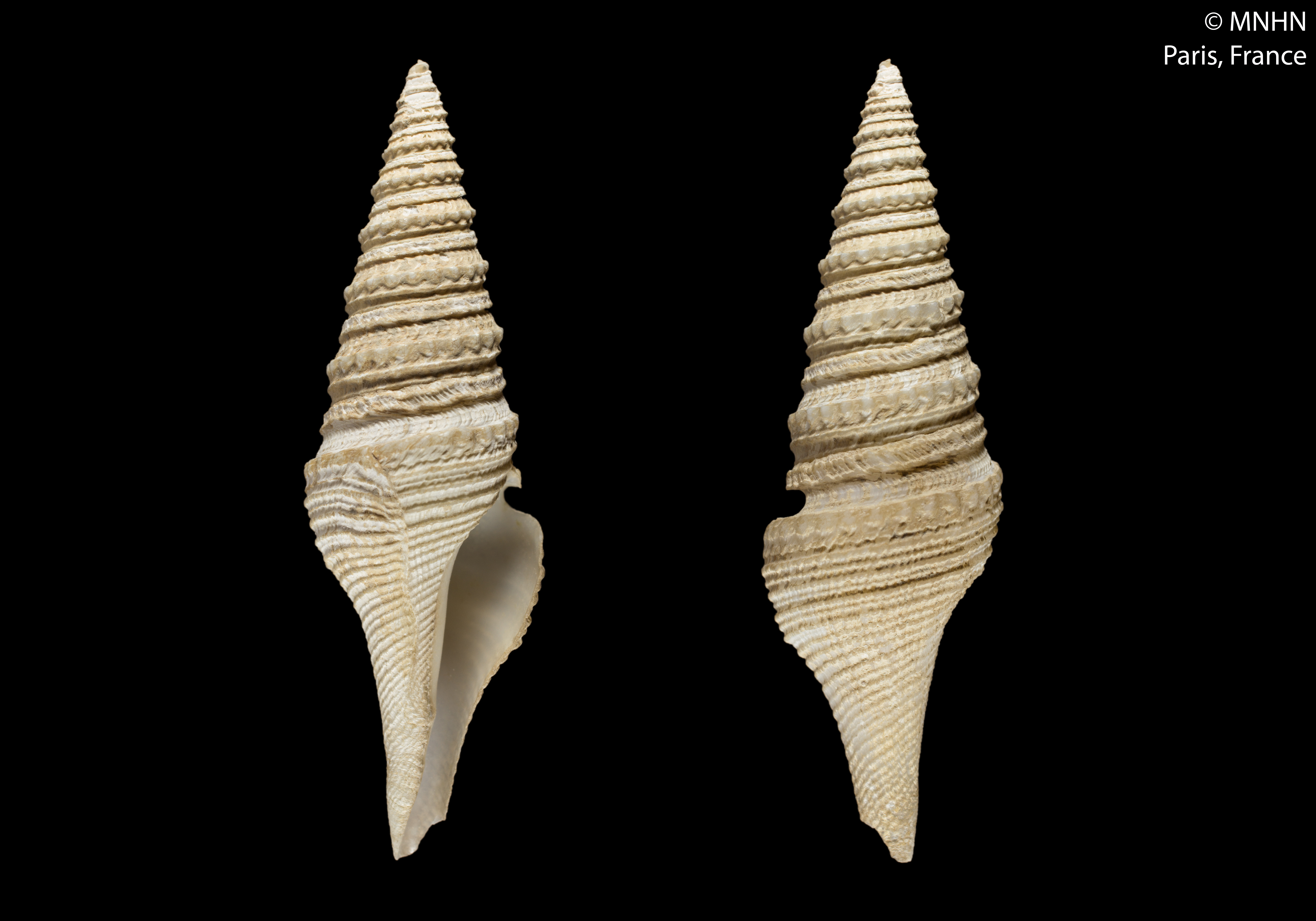
- Heteroturris gemmuloides

Scientific classification
- Kingdom: Animalia
- Phylum: Mollusca
- Class: Gastropoda
- Subclass: Caenogastropoda
- Order: Neogastropoda
- Superfamily: Conoidea
- Family: Borsoniidae
- Genus: Heteroturris
- Species: H. gemmuloides

Binomial name
- Heteroturris gemmuloides Sysoev, 1997

= Heteroturris gemmuloides =

Species of gastropod

Heteroturris gemmuloides is a species of sea snail, a marine gastropod mollusk in the family Borsoniidae.

== Description ==
The length of the shell attains 40.4 mm.

== Distribution ==
This marine species occurs off Eastern Indonesia.
