= Abyssothauma psilarosis =

Scientific classification
- Kingdom: Animalia
- Phylum: Mollusca
- Class: Gastropoda
- Subclass: Caenogastropoda
- Order: Neogastropoda
- Superfamily: Conoidea
- Family: Raphitomidae
- Genus: Abyssothauma
- Species: A. psilarosis

Binomial name
- Abyssothauma psilarosis (Barnard, 1963)

Synonyms
- Moniliopsis psilarosis Barnard, 1963 (original combination)

Species of gastropod

Abyssothauma psilarosis is a species of sea snail, a marine gastropod mollusk in the family Raphitomidae.

== Description ==
Operculum narrow and amber-colored. Body pale, with eyes at the base of short tentacles. Radula with 15 pairs of elongate teeth.

== Distribution ==
This is a deep-sea species, occurring off South Africa
