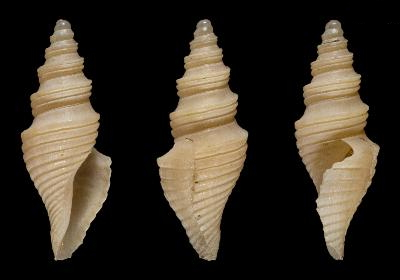
- Shells of Tropidoturris vizcondei (holotype at MNHN, Paris)

Scientific classification
- Kingdom: Animalia
- Phylum: Mollusca
- Class: Gastropoda
- Subclass: Caenogastropoda
- Order: Neogastropoda
- Superfamily: Conoidea
- Family: Borsoniidae
- Genus: Tropidoturris
- Species: T. vizcondei

Binomial name
- Tropidoturris vizcondei Morassi & Bonfitto, 2013

= Tropidoturris vizcondei =

Species of gastropod

Tropidoturris vizcondei is a species of sea snail, a marine gastropod mollusk in the family Borsoniidae.

== Distribution ==
This marine species occurs in the Mozambique Channel.
