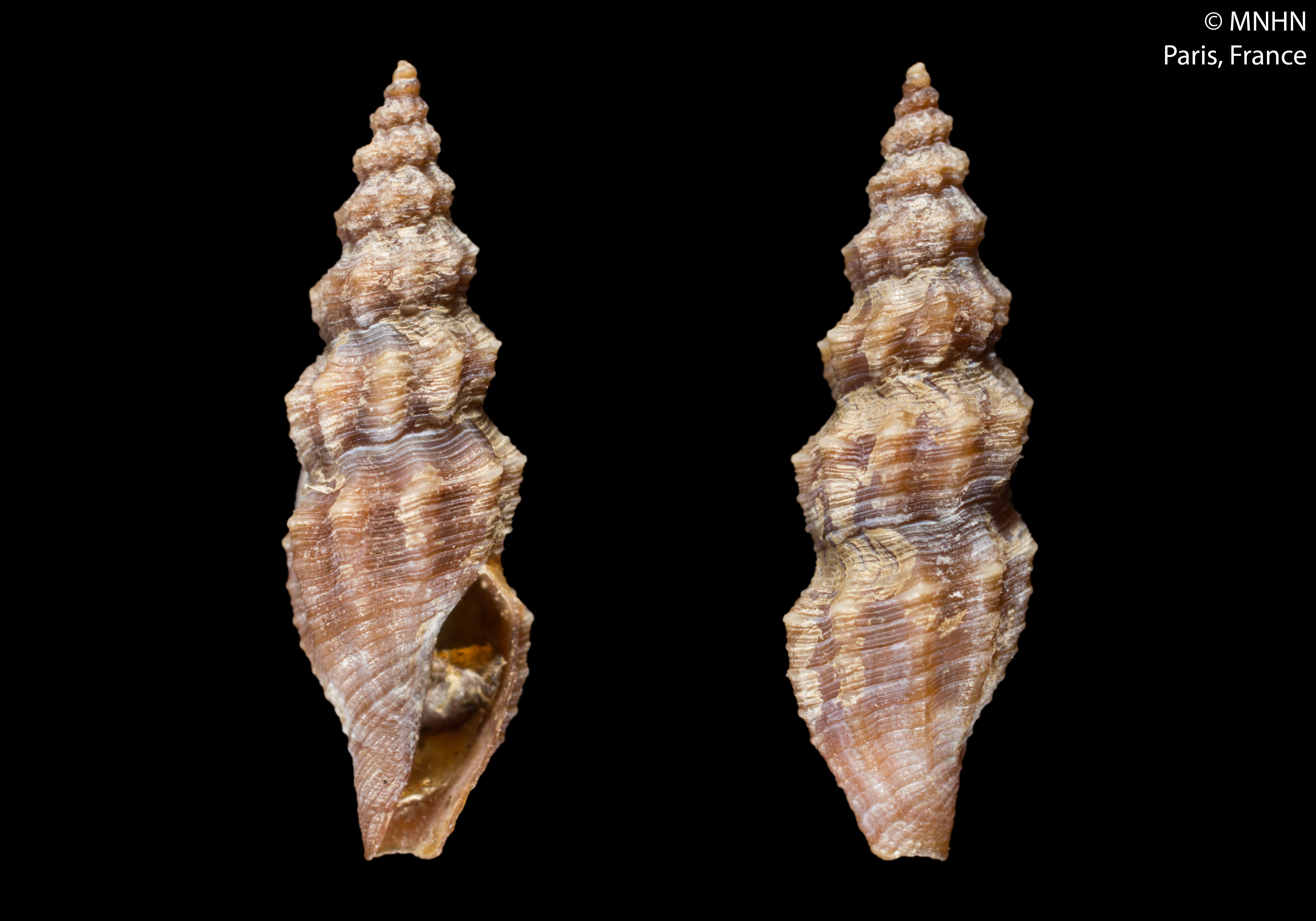
- Turrella letourneuxiana

Scientific classification
- Kingdom: Animalia
- Phylum: Mollusca
- Class: Gastropoda
- Subclass: Caenogastropoda
- Order: Neogastropoda
- Superfamily: Conoidea
- Family: Clathurellidae
- Genus: Turrella; Laseron, 1954

Type species
- Clathurella tenuilirata Angas, 1871

Species
- See text

Synonyms
- Clathurella letourneuxiana (Crosse & P. Fischer, 1865) ·; Daphnella letourneuxiana (Crosse & P. Fischer, 1865); Guraleus letourneuxianus (Crosse & P. Fischer, 1865); Pleurotoma (Clathurella) letourneuxiana Crosse & P. Fischer, 1865 (basionym); Pleurotoma letourneuxiana Crosse & P. Fischer, 1865 ·(original combination)

= Turrella (gastropod) =

Genus of gastropods

Turrella is a genus of sea snails, marine gastropod mollusks in the family Clathurellidae.

== Species ==
Species within the genus Turrella include:

- Turrella asperrima Laseron, 1954
- Turrella crassa Laseron, 1954
- Turrella gracilis Laseron, 1954
- Turrella granulosissima (Tenison-Woods, 1879)
- Turrella letourneuxiana (Crosse & P. Fischer, 1865)
- Turrella morologus (Hedley, 1922)
- Turrella subcostata Laseron, 1954
- Turrella tenuilirata (Angas, 1871)
