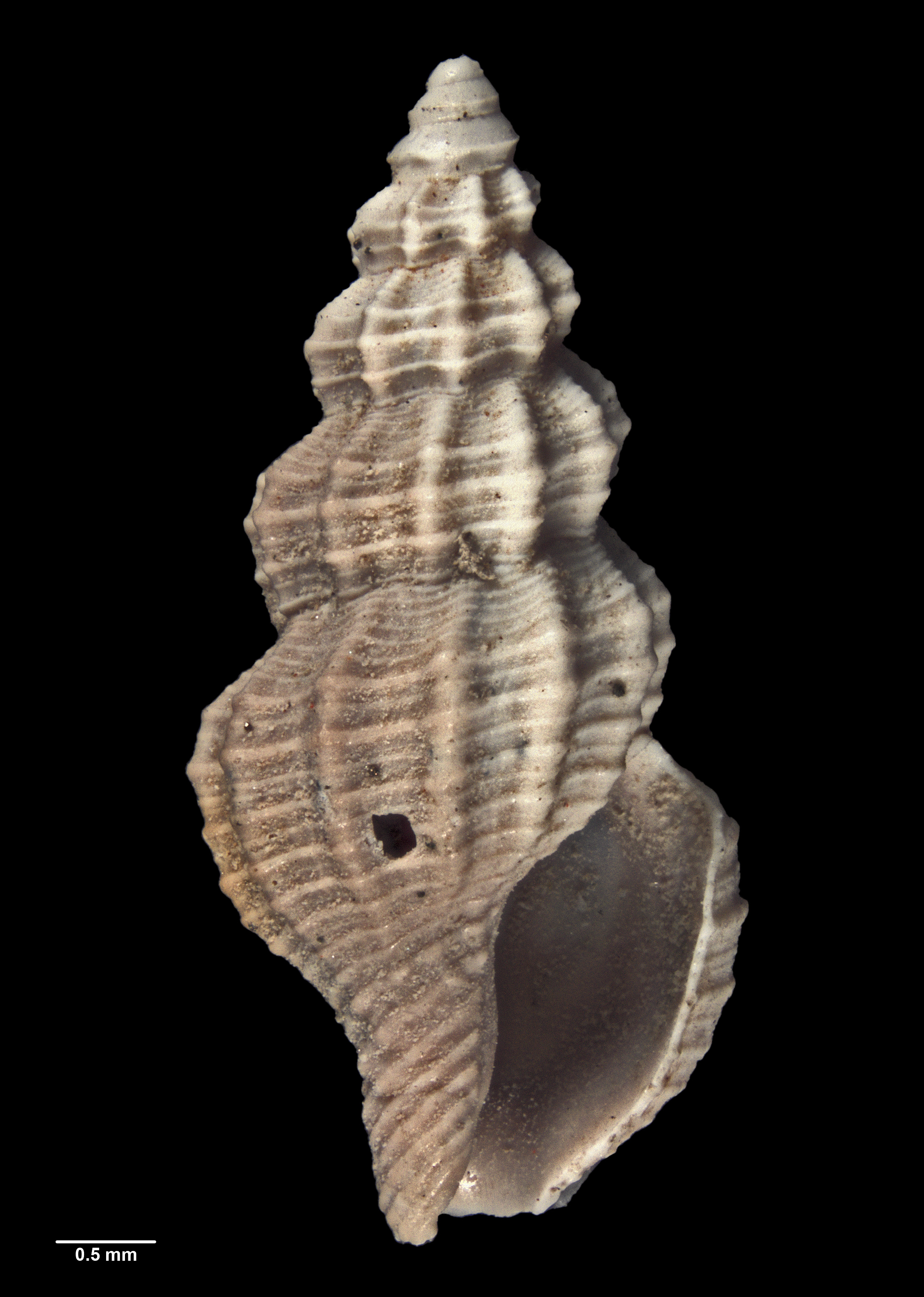
- Holotype from Auckland War Memorial Museum

Scientific classification
- Kingdom: Animalia
- Phylum: Mollusca
- Class: Gastropoda
- Subclass: Caenogastropoda
- Order: Neogastropoda
- Family: Clathurellidae
- Genus: Etremopsis
- Species: †E. opposita

Binomial name
- †Etremopsis opposita A. W. B. Powell, 1944

= Etremopsis opposita =

Etremopsis opposita Temporal range: middle Miocene

Extinct species of gastropod

Etremopsis opposita is an extinct species of sea snail, a marine gastropod mollusc, in the family Clathurellidae. Fossils of the species date to middle Miocene strata of the Port Phillip Basin of Victoria, Australia.

== Description ==
In the original description, Powell described the species as follows:

Small, fusiform, with tall turreted spire. Whorls convex, but with a straight sloping shoulder at two-thirds whorl height, which forms a slight angle above the greatest peripheral convexity. Sculptured with strong, rounded, vertical axials, 11 per whorl, extending from upper suture over base to neck; crossed by primary cords and secondary lirations. On the penultimate there are 5 lirations on the shoulder, 4 primary cords from shoulder angle to the lower suture, second from above at the periphery, and a single intermediate thread in each interspace. There are 16 primary cords on the body-whorl, last 7 closely spaced on the anterior end. Outer-lip strengthened by a heavy varix. Sinus deep, rounded, occupying the shoulder. Parietal tubercle scarcely developed; no other apertural processes.

The holotype of the species measures 6 mm (0.24 in) in height and has a diameter of 2.7 mm (0.11 in).

== Taxonomy ==
The species was first described by A. W. B. Powell in 1944. The holotype was collected at an unknown date prior to 1944 from the Altona Bay brown coal shafts in Victoria, Australia, and is held by the Auckland War Memorial Museum.

== Distribution ==
This extinct marine species occurs in middle Miocene strata of the Port Phillip Basin of Victoria, Australia, including the Gellibrand Formation.

== Gallery ==
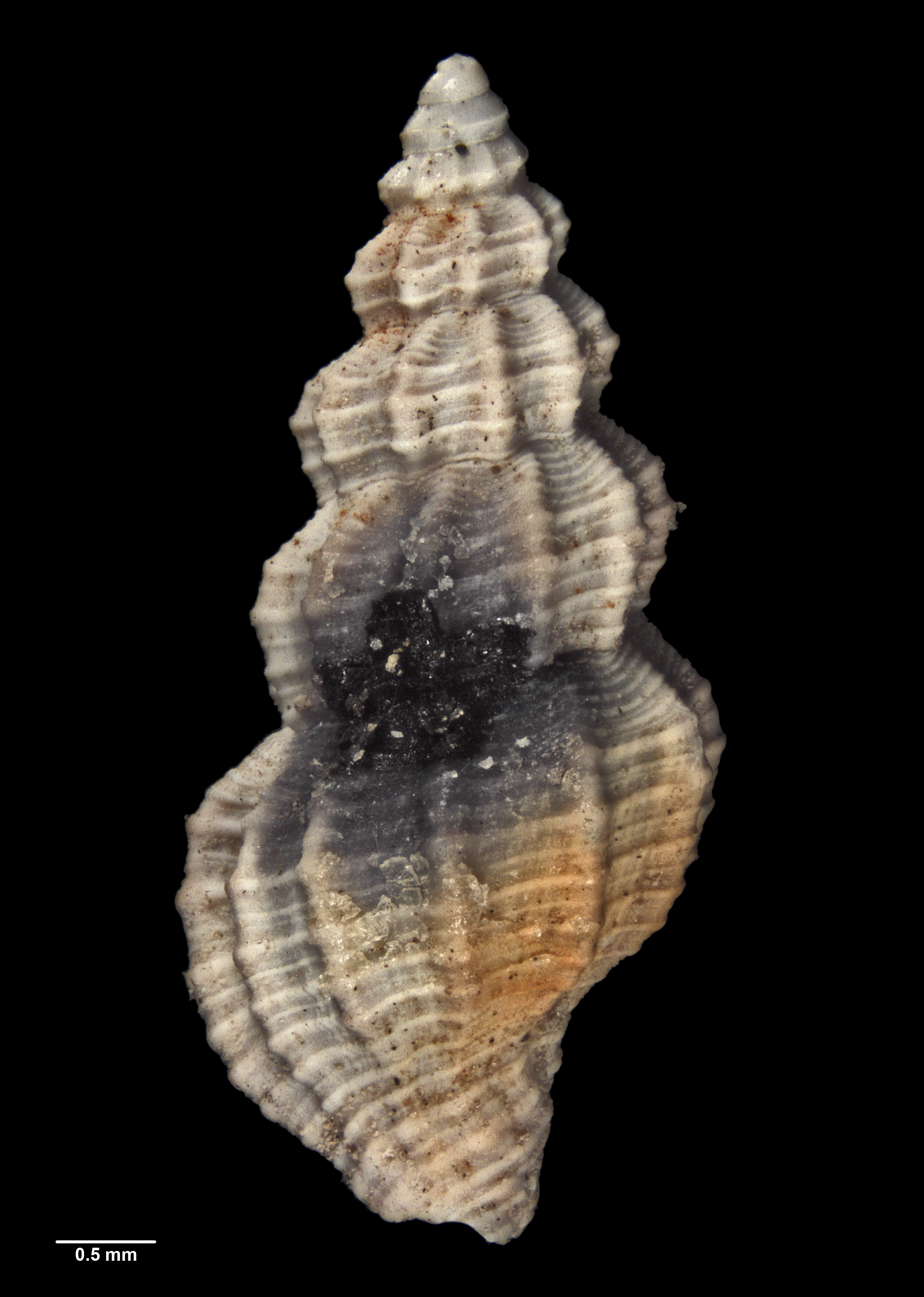
Reverse view of holotype

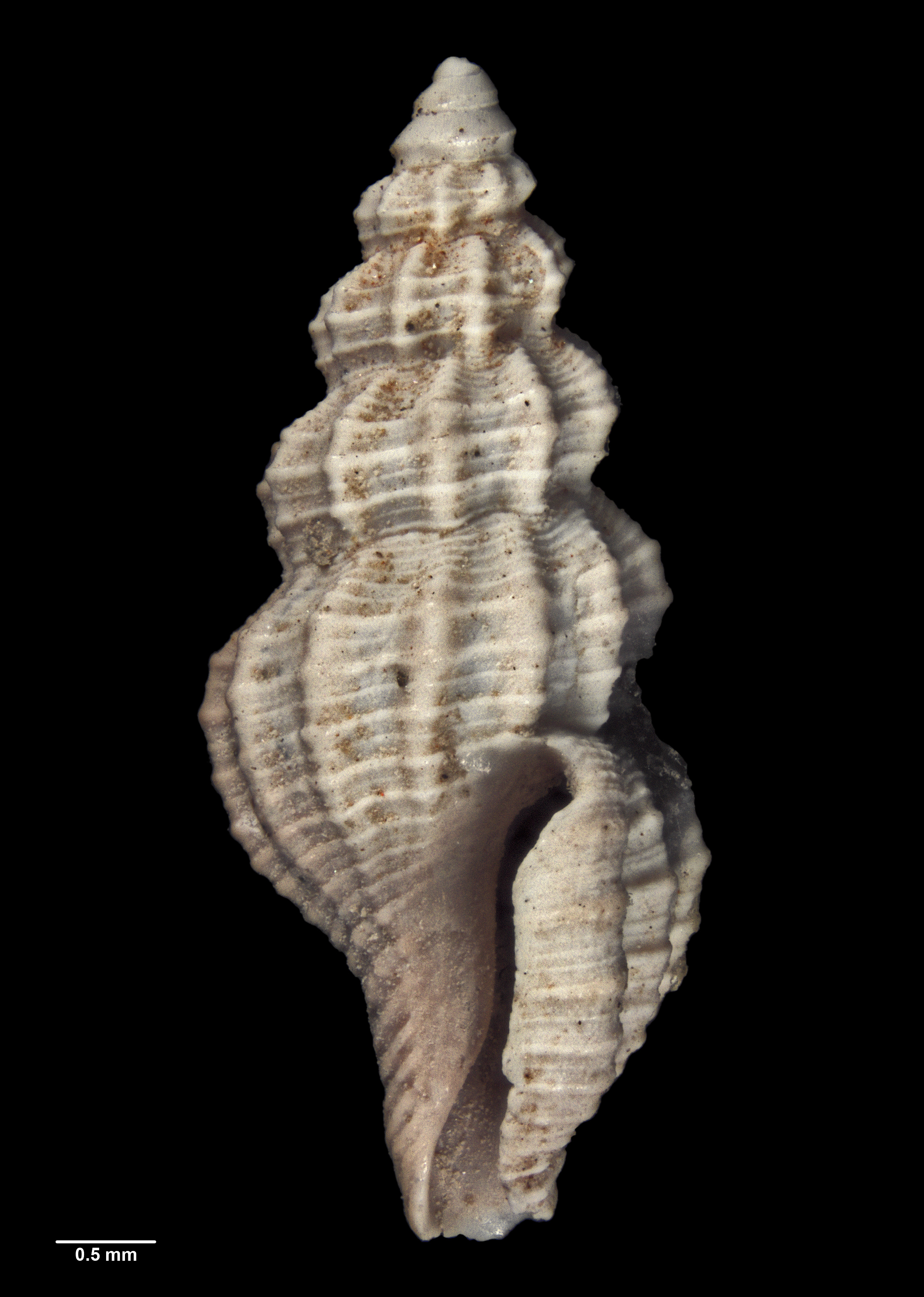
Side view of holotype
