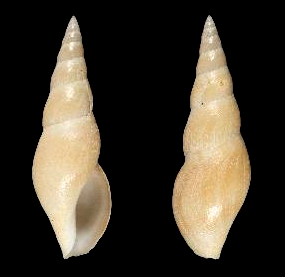
- Shell of Leiosyrinx matsukumai (holotype in the MNHN, Paris)

Scientific classification
- Kingdom: Animalia
- Phylum: Mollusca
- Class: Gastropoda
- Subclass: Caenogastropoda
- Order: Neogastropoda
- Superfamily: Conoidea
- Family: Raphitomidae
- Genus: Leiosyrinx
- Species: L. matsukumai

Binomial name
- Leiosyrinx matsukumai Bouchet & Sysoev, 2001

= Leiosyrinx matsukumai =

Species of gastropod

Leiosyrinx matsukumai is a species of sea snail, a marine gastropod mollusk in the family Raphitomidae.

== Description ==
The length of the shell attains 27 mm.

== Distribution ==
This marine species is found in deep water off the Philippines and in the East China Sea.
