= Tropidoturris planilirata =

Scientific classification
- Kingdom: Animalia
- Phylum: Mollusca
- Class: Gastropoda
- Subclass: Caenogastropoda
- Order: Neogastropoda
- Superfamily: Conoidea
- Family: Borsoniidae
- Genus: Tropidoturris
- Species: T. planilirata

Binomial name
- Tropidoturris planilirata Kilburn, 1986

Species of gastropod

Tropidoturris planilirata is a species of sea snail, a marine gastropod mollusk in the family Borsoniidae.

== Description ==
The size of the biconic shell attains 16.8 mm. Characteristical for this species is the fact that the shell has no axial ribs. The broad spiral lirae are close and flattened. The shoulder cord is very weak.

== Distribution ==
This marine species occurs off KwaZulu-Natal, South Africa
