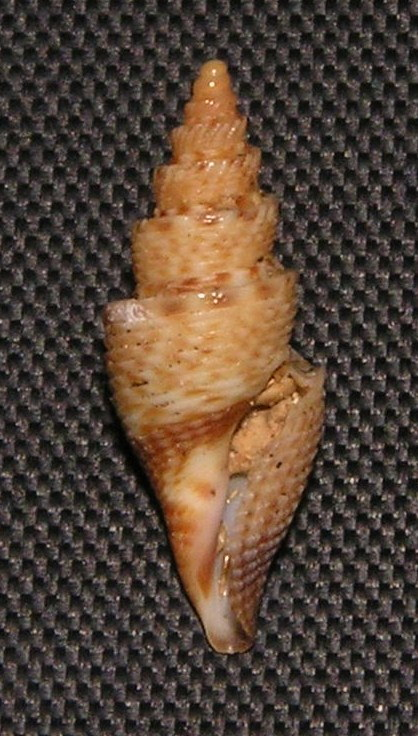
- Apertural view of a shell of the subspecies Tropidoturris fossata notialis

Scientific classification
- Kingdom: Animalia
- Phylum: Mollusca
- Class: Gastropoda
- Subclass: Caenogastropoda
- Order: Neogastropoda
- Superfamily: Conoidea
- Family: Borsoniidae
- Genus: Tropidoturris
- Species: T. fossata

Binomial name
- Tropidoturris fossata (Sowerby III, 1903)

Synonyms
- Drillia fossata (G.B. Sowerby III, 1903); Pleurotoma fossata Sowerby III, 1903 (original combination); Tropidoturris fossata fossata (Sowerby III, 1903) · accepted, alternate representation

= Tropidoturris fossata =

Species of gastropod

Tropidoturris fossata is a species of sea snail, a marine gastropod mollusk in the family Borsoniidae.

There is one subspecies: Tropidoturris fossata notialis Kilburn, 1986

== Description ==
The size of the shell attains 20.4 mm.

(Original description) The fusiform shell is acuminated at both ends. Its color is pale fulvous, obscurely spotted with brown, here and there tinged with light purple, and coloured anteriorly with a purplish band. The spire is acute, gradately turreted. It contains 8 whorls. The first two are smooth, rounded, forming a papillary apex. The third is angular and ribbed below the angle. The rest is deeply concave at the top, the concavity being bordered by a sharp erect keel, below which the whorls are slightly convex, with short very oblique plicae, and about 5 spiral lirae which are sharply angular at the top and slopingly compressed on the under side. The body whorl ais bout equal in length to the spire, slightly convex above, and tapering to the base. The oblique plicae against the keel become almost obsolete on the latter half of the whorl, while the spiral lirae numbering about 22 are quite as deep and broad as those on the upper whorls. The aperture is oblong, moderately wide, without any definite anterior siphonal canal. The outer lip is thin, with rather a broad sinus at the juncture of the whorl.

The shell shows a distinct character, quite unlike any other known species. The sharp erect keel at the top of the whorls, the broad channel between this and the suture, and the numerous curiously sloping spiral lirae throughout, are its chief characteristics.

== Distribution ==
This marine species occurs off Zululand, South Africa
