= Tropidoturris anaglypta =

Scientific classification
- Kingdom: Animalia
- Phylum: Mollusca
- Class: Gastropoda
- Subclass: Caenogastropoda
- Order: Neogastropoda
- Superfamily: Conoidea
- Family: Borsoniidae
- Genus: Tropidoturris
- Species: T. anaglypta

Binomial name
- Tropidoturris anaglypta Kilburn, 1986

Species of gastropod

Tropidoturris anaglypta is a species of sea snail, a marine gastropod mollusk in the family Borsoniidae.

== Description ==
The size of the shell attains 10 mm.

== Distribution ==
This marine species occurs off KwaZulu-Natal and Zululand, South Africa.
