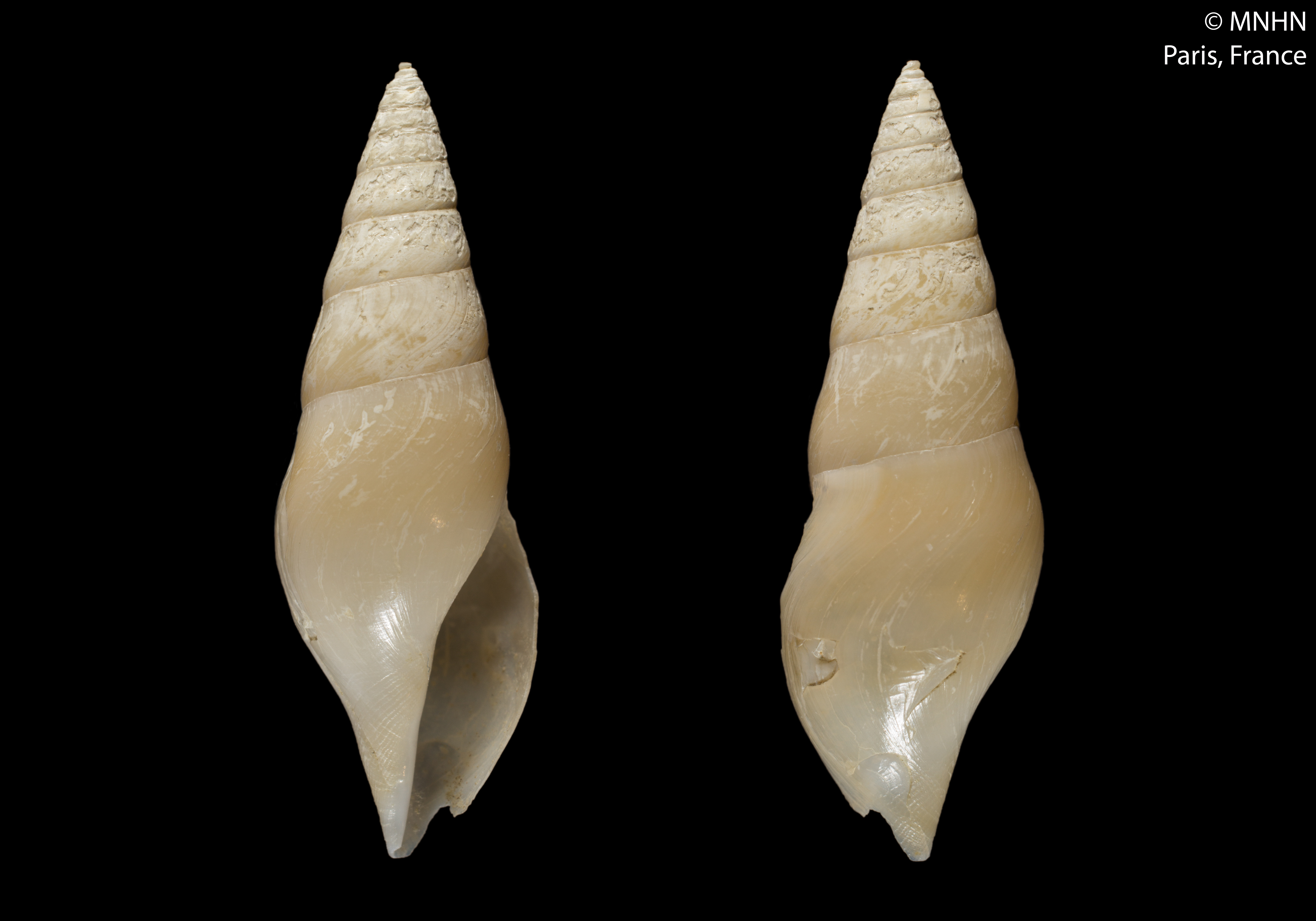

Scientific classification
- Kingdom: Animalia
- Phylum: Mollusca
- Class: Gastropoda
- Subclass: Caenogastropoda
- Order: Neogastropoda
- Superfamily: Conoidea
- Family: Raphitomidae
- Genus: Leiosyrinx
- Species: L. apheles

Binomial name
- Leiosyrinx apheles Bouchet & Sysoev, 2001

= Leiosyrinx apheles =

Species of gastropod

Leiosyrinx apheles is a species of sea snail, a marine gastropod mollusk in the family Raphitomidae.

== Description ==
The length of the shell attains 25.6 mm.

== Distribution ==
This marine species is found in deep water off Indonesia.
