= Tropidoturris simplicicingula =

Scientific classification
- Kingdom: Animalia
- Phylum: Mollusca
- Class: Gastropoda
- Subclass: Caenogastropoda
- Order: Neogastropoda
- Superfamily: Conoidea
- Family: Borsoniidae
- Genus: Tropidoturris
- Species: T. simplicicingula

Binomial name
- Tropidoturris simplicicingula (Barnard, 1958)

Synonyms
- Drillia simplicicingula Barnard, 1958 (original combination); Tropidoturris simplicicingula simplicicingula (Barnard, 1958) · accepted, alternate representation

Species of gastropod

Tropidoturris simplicicingula is a species of sea snail, a marine gastropod mollusk in the family Borsoniidae.

There is one subspecies: Tropidoturris simplicicingula pondo Kilburn, 1986

== Description ==
The size of the biconic shell attains 19.8 mm. Characteristic for this species is the fact that the shell has no axial ribs. The narrower spiral lirae are declivous. The shoulder cord is stronger to carinate.

== Distribution ==
This marine species occurs off Agulhas Bank, South Africa
