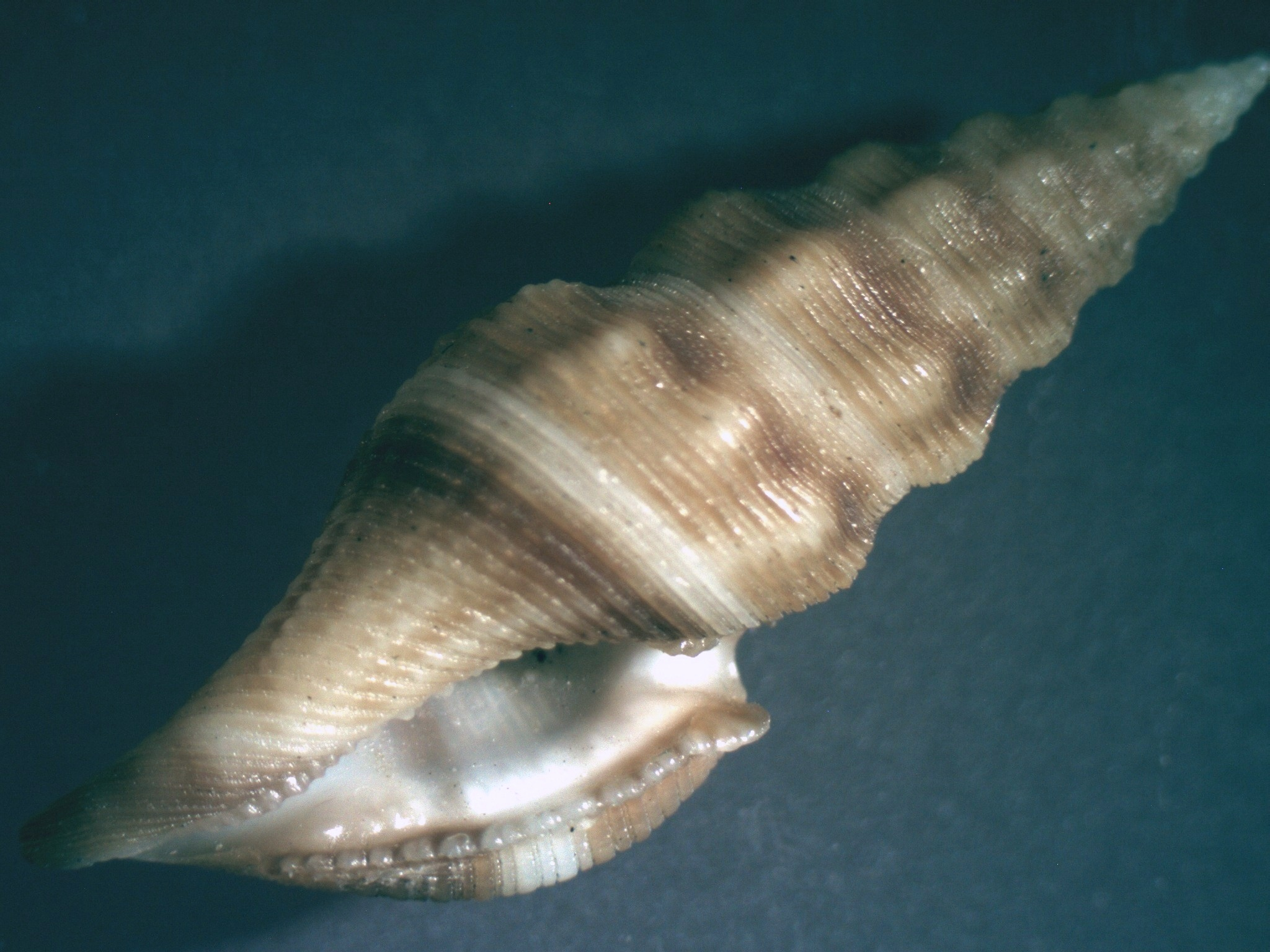
- Apertural view of Glyphostoma rostrata

Scientific classification
- Kingdom: Animalia
- Phylum: Mollusca
- Class: Gastropoda
- Subclass: Caenogastropoda
- Order: Neogastropoda
- Family: Clathurellidae
- Genus: Glyphostoma
- Species: G. rostrata

Binomial name
- Glyphostoma rostrata Sysoev & Bouchet, 2001

= Glyphostoma rostrata =

Species of gastropod

Glyphostoma rostrata is a species of sea snail, a marine gastropod mollusc in the family Clathurellidae.

== Description ==
The size of an adult shell varies between 20 and 30 millimetres (0.79 and 1.18 in).

== Distribution ==
This species occurs in the Pacific Ocean along the Philippines and New Caledonia.
