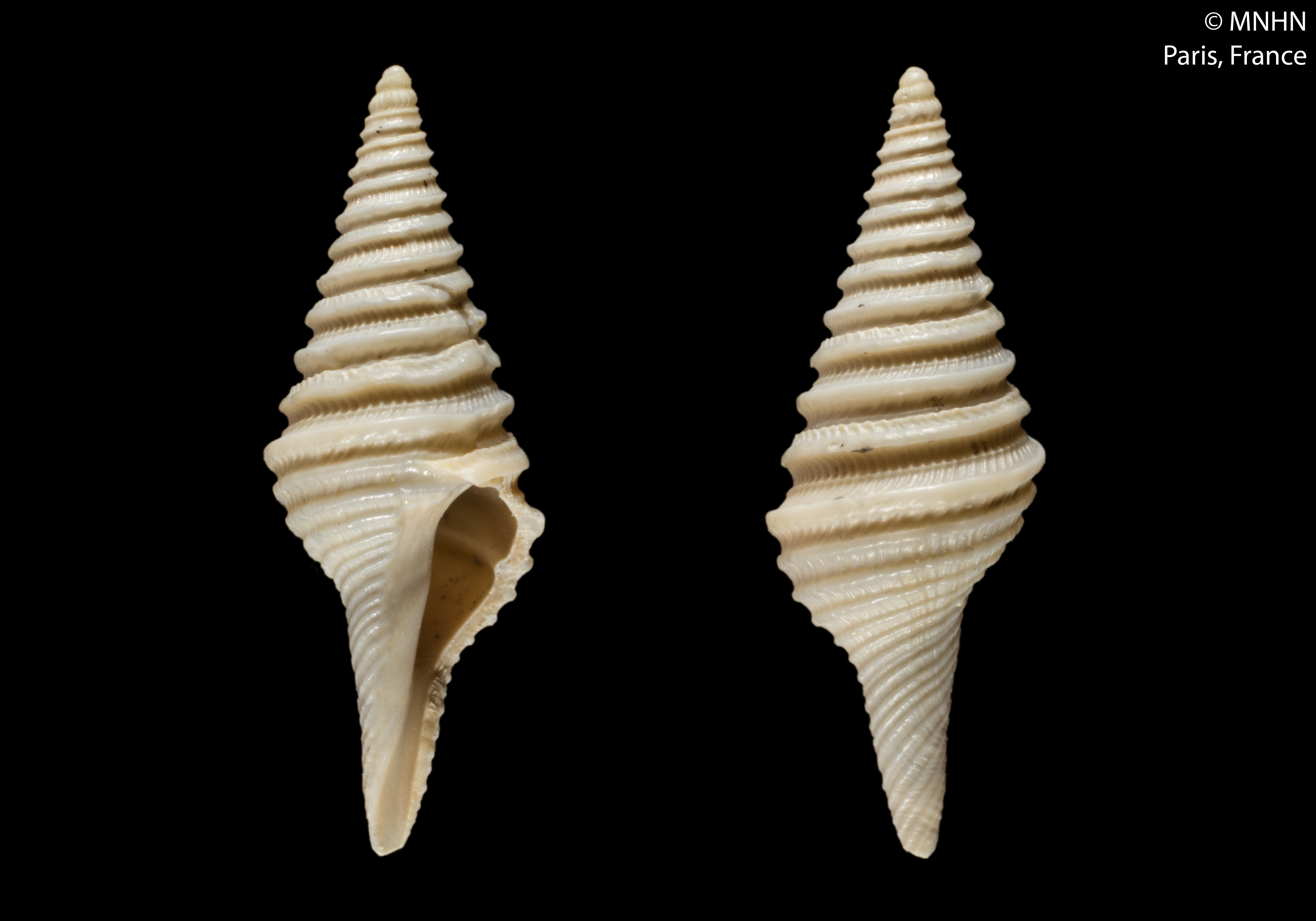
- Heteroturris serta from the National Museum of Natural History, France

Scientific classification
- Kingdom: Animalia
- Phylum: Mollusca
- Class: Gastropoda
- Subclass: Caenogastropoda
- Order: Neogastropoda
- Superfamily: Conoidea
- Family: Borsoniidae
- Genus: Heteroturris
- Species: H. serta

Binomial name
- Heteroturris serta Sysoev, 1997

= Heteroturris serta =

Species of gastropod

Heteroturris serta is a species of sea snail, a marine gastropod mollusk in the family Borsoniidae.

== Description ==
The length of the shell attains 9.3 mm.

== Distribution ==
This marine species occurs off Eastern Indonesia
