= Pseudoetrema =

Scientific classification
- Kingdom: Animalia
- Phylum: Mollusca
- Class: Gastropoda
- Subclass: Caenogastropoda
- Order: Neogastropoda
- Superfamily: Conoidea
- Family: Clathurellidae
- Genus: Pseudoetrema; Oyama, 1953

Type species
- Drillia fortilirata E. A. Smith, 1879

Species
- See text

Genus of gastropods

Pseudoetrema is a genus of sea snails, marine gastropod mollusks in the family Clathurellidae.

== Species ==
Species within the genus Pseudoetrema include:

- Pseudoetrema crassicingulata (Schepman, 1913)
- Pseudoetrema fortilirata (E. A. Smith, 1879)
