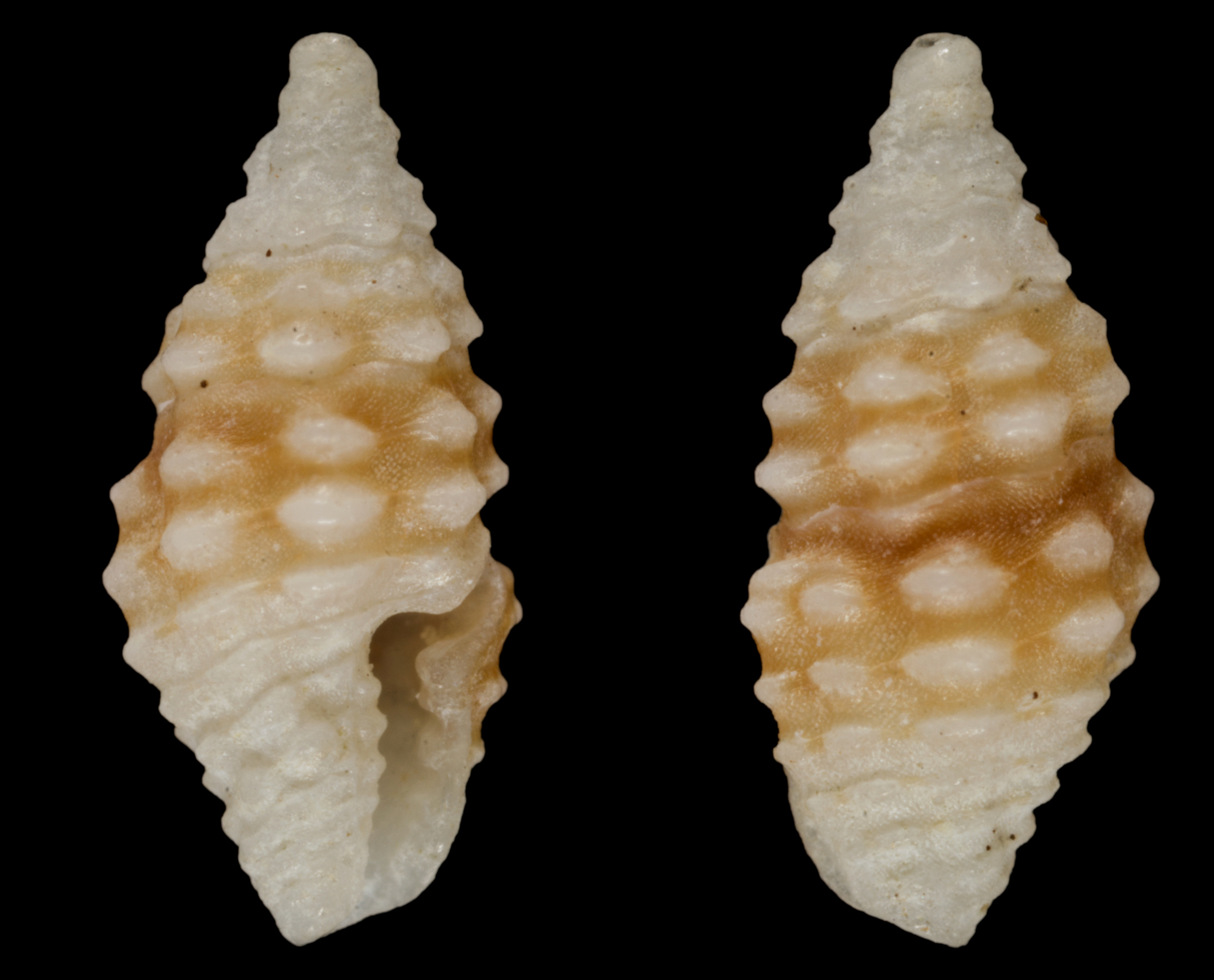
- Shell of Acrista tuberculifera (syntype at MNHN, Paris)

Scientific classification
- Kingdom: Animalia
- Phylum: Mollusca
- Class: Gastropoda
- Subclass: Caenogastropoda
- Order: Neogastropoda
- Superfamily: Conoidea
- Family: Clathurellidae
- Genus: Acrista
- Species: A. tuberculifera

Binomial name
- Acrista tuberculifera (Hervier, 1896)

Synonyms
- Glyphostoma marchei var. tuberculifera Hervier, 1896 (basionym)

= Acrista tuberculifera =

Species of gastropods

Acrista nana is a species of sea snails, marine gastropod mollusks in the family Clathurellidae.

== Description ==
The length of the shell varies between 4 mm and 5 mm.

(Original description in Latin) The shell is small. The tuberculous lyrae often disappear in the interstices. The tubercles are less lenticular and are rather round.

== Distribution ==
This marine species occurs off the Loyalty Islands.
