= Heteroturris sola =

Scientific classification
- Kingdom: Animalia
- Phylum: Mollusca
- Class: Gastropoda
- Subclass: Caenogastropoda
- Order: Neogastropoda
- Superfamily: Conoidea
- Family: Borsoniidae
- Genus: Heteroturris
- Species: H. sola

Binomial name
- Heteroturris sola Powell, 1967

Species of gastropod

Heteroturris sola is a species of sea snail, a marine gastropod mollusk in the family Borsoniidae.

== Distribution ==
This marine species occurs off Cebu, the Philippines.
