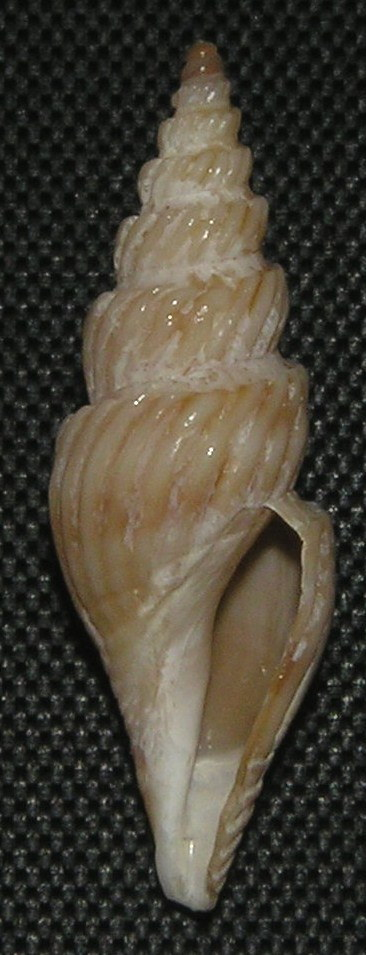

Scientific classification
- Kingdom: Animalia
- Phylum: Mollusca
- Class: Gastropoda
- Subclass: Caenogastropoda
- Order: Neogastropoda
- Superfamily: Conoidea
- Family: Borsoniidae
- Genus: Tropidoturris
- Species: T. scitecostata

Binomial name
- Tropidoturris scitecostata (Sowerby III, 1903)

Synonyms
- Clavatula (Surcula) opulenta Thiele, 1925 ·; Comitas opulenta [partim]; Powell, 1969; Drillia scitecosta (G.B. Sowerby III, 1903); Drillia scitecostata [sic] (misspelling); Pleurotoma (Drillia) scitecosta Sowerby III, 1903 (original combination); Pleurotoma scitecosta [sic] (misspelling); Surcula opulenta Thiele, J., 1925

= Tropidoturris scitecostata =

Species of gastropod

Tropidoturris scitecostata is a species of sea snail, a marine gastropod mollusk in the family Borsoniidae.

== Description ==
The size of the shell attains 23.5 mm, its width 7 mm. (Original description) The fusiform shell is acuminated at both ends. Its color is light brown without markings. The spire is acutely turreted. It contains 8 whorls. The apical ones are smooth rounded oblique. The rest are deeply and smoothly concave at the top, then slightly convex, furnished with numerous oblique rounded smooth close-set ribs, the ribs terminating in a well-defined angle at the top. The body whorl is about equal in length to the spire, slightly convex above and tapering below. It is spirally lirate towards the base and scarcely rostrate. The aperture is oblong, its interior smooth and brown. The columella is rather straight. The outer lip is thin, arched, with a moderate posterior sinus situated close to the suture.

== Distribution ==
This marine species occurs off Transkei, South Africa
