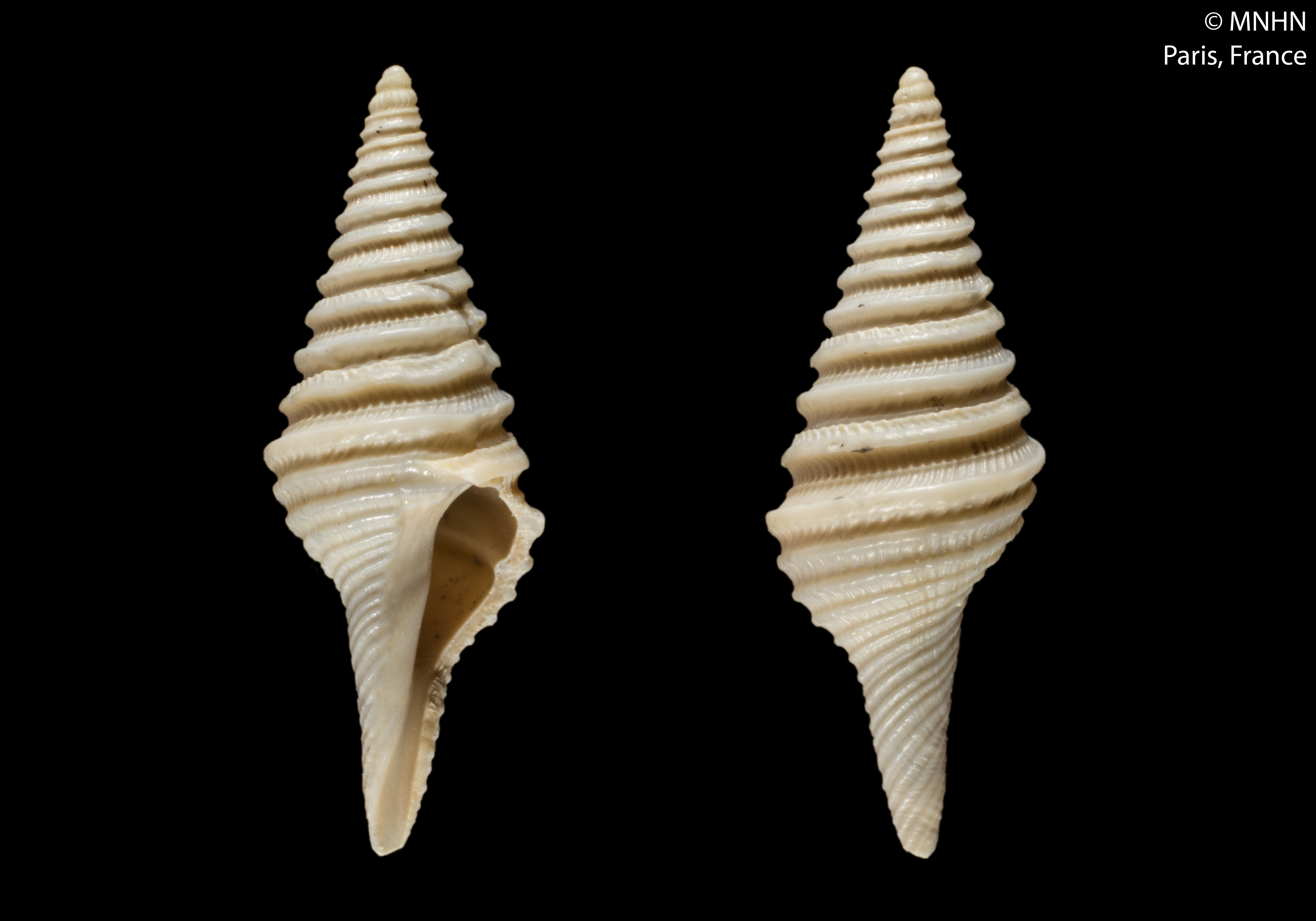
- Heteroturris serta

Scientific classification
- Kingdom: Animalia
- Phylum: Mollusca
- Class: Gastropoda
- Subclass: Caenogastropoda
- Order: Neogastropoda
- Superfamily: Conoidea
- Family: Borsoniidae
- Genus: Heteroturris; Powell, 1967

Type species
- Heteroturris sola Powell, 1967

= Heteroturris =

Genus of gastropods

Heteroturris is a genus of sea snails, marine gastropod mollusks in the family Borsoniidae.

This genus was previously included in the subfamily Clathurellinae of the family Clavatulidae.

== Species ==
Species within the genus Heteroturris include:

- Heteroturris gemmuloides Sysoev, 1997
- Heteroturris kanacospira Kantor, Fedosov & Puillandre, 2018
- Heteroturris serta Sysoev, 1997
- Heteroturris sola Powell, 1967
