= Buridrillia panarica =

Scientific classification
- Kingdom: Animalia
- Phylum: Mollusca
- Class: Gastropoda
- Subclass: Caenogastropoda
- Order: Neogastropoda
- Superfamily: Conoidea
- Family: Pseudomelatomidae
- Genus: Buridrillia
- Species: B. panarica

Binomial name
- Buridrillia panarica (A.A. Olsson, 1942 )

Synonyms
- Clathrodrillia (Buridrillia) panarica (A.A. Olsson, 1942 ); † Turris panarica A.A. Olsson, 1942

Extinct species of gastropod

Buridrillia panarica is an extinct species of sea snail, a marine gastropod mollusk in the family Pseudomelatomidae.

== Distribution ==
Fossils of this marine species were found in West Panama and in Pliocene strata of Costa Rica and Ecuador; age range: 3.6 to 2.588 Ma
