= Tuberculifer =

Tuberculifera may refer to:

- Aradus tuberculifer, species of flat bug
- Pyrophorus tuberculifer, species of click beetle

== See also ==
- Tuberculifera
