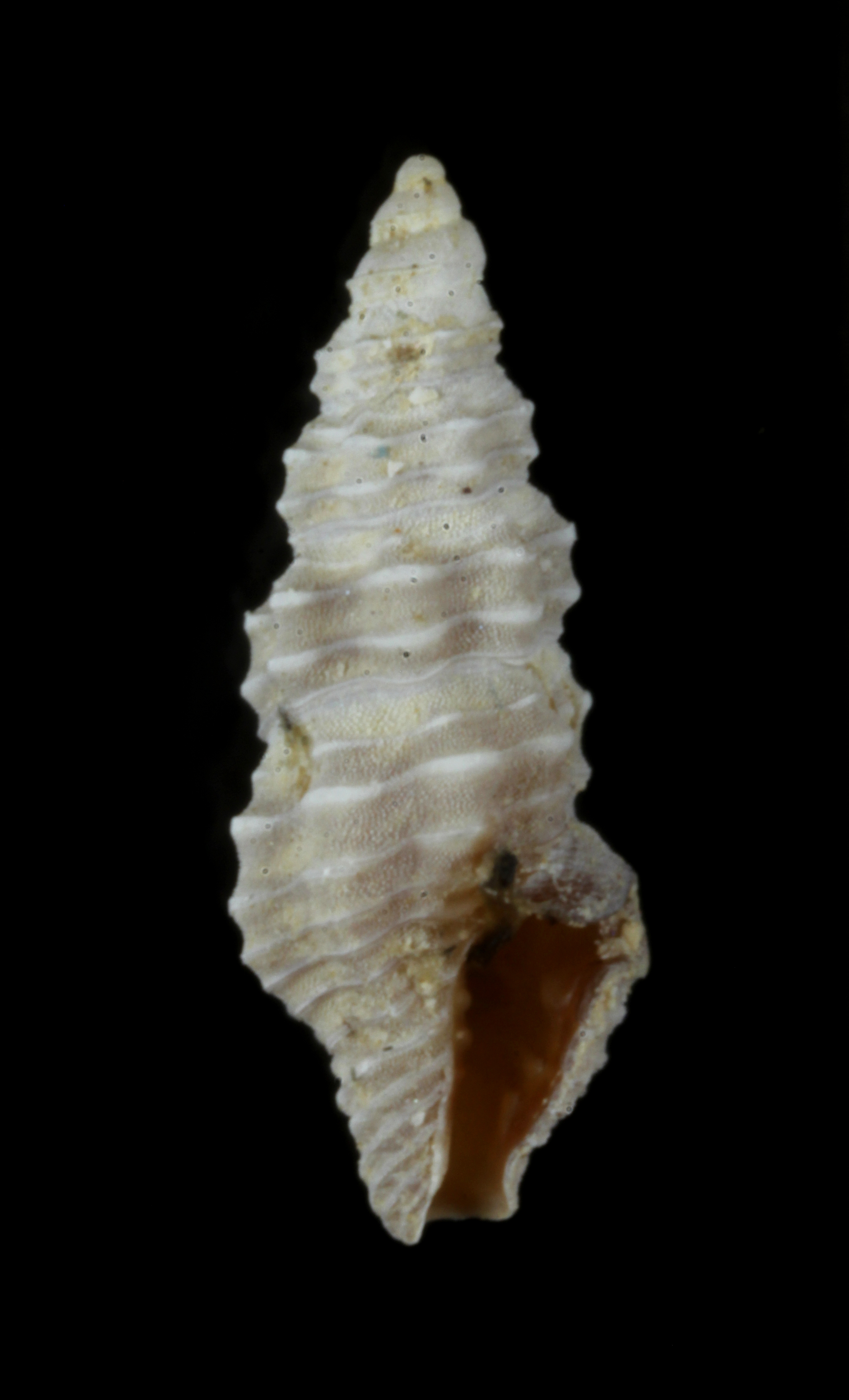
- Acrista sp. (specimen at MNHN, Paris)

Scientific classification
- Kingdom: Animalia
- Phylum: Mollusca
- Class: Gastropoda
- Subclass: Caenogastropoda
- Order: Neogastropoda
- Superfamily: Conoidea
- Family: Clathurellidae
- Genus: Acrista; Hedley, 1922

Type species
- Lienardia punctilla Hedley, 1922

Synonyms
- Lienardia (Acrista) Hedley, 1922 (original rank)

= Acrista (gastropod) =

Genus of gastropods

Acrista is a genus of sea snails, marine gastropod mollusks in the family Clathurellidae.

== Distribution ==
This marine species occurs in the Indo-west Pacific, from Madagascar to Fiji; also off Australia (Queensland) and Papua New Guinea.

== Species ==
- Acrista latirella (Melvill & Standen, 1896)
- Acrista nana (Hervier, 1896)
- Acrista punctilla (Hedley, 1922): the spotted turret
- Acrista pusilla (Dunker, 1871)
- Acrista tuberculifera (Hervier, 1896)
