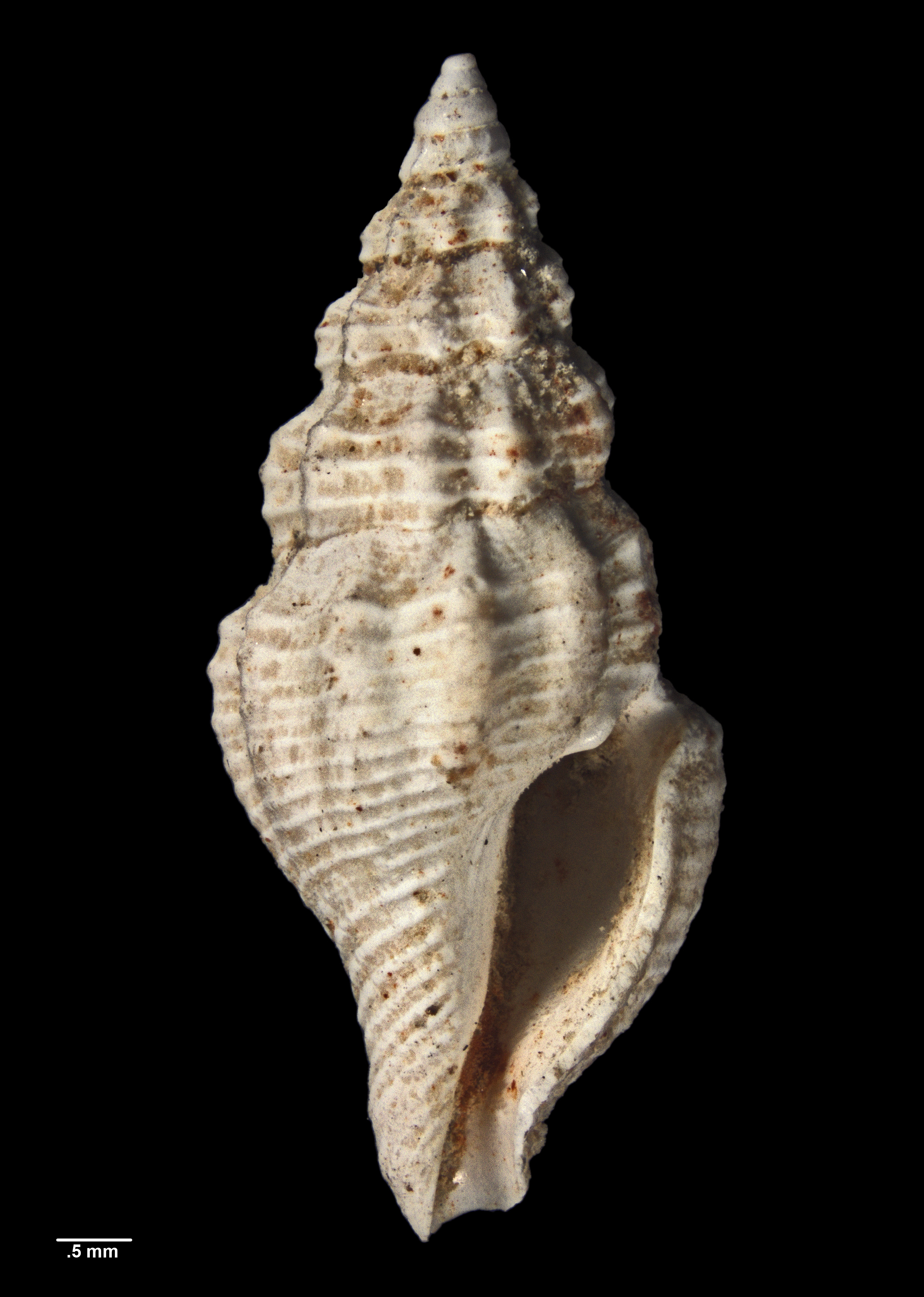
- Etremopsis quadrispiralis

Scientific classification
- Kingdom: Animalia
- Phylum: Mollusca
- Class: Gastropoda
- Subclass: Caenogastropoda
- Order: Neogastropoda
- Family: Clathurellidae
- Genus: Etremopsis; A. W. B. Powell, 1942

Type species
- Drillia imperfecta Suter, 1917

Synonyms
- Iraqetrema Dance & Eames, 1966

= Etremopsis =

Etremopsis Temporal range: 27.3–Recent Ma

Genus of gastropods

Etremopsis is a genus of marine gastropods of the family Clathurellidae. While the sole extant species, E. albata, lives in the waters of the Indian Ocean, all other known species are fossils which have been found in New Zealand and Australia.

== Description ==
Members of Etremopsis have a large protoconch, having between 5–6 whorls, with shells that are polygyrate and carinated. Shells in the genus have heights ranging between 4–8 mm (0.16–0.31 in), are fusiform, and have moderately elevated spires. The genus can be identified due to having a less strongly armoured aperture, the lack of inner lip denticles or tubercles, outside of the parietal denticle.

== Taxonomy ==
The genus was first described in 1942 by A. W. B. Powell, who identified the genus as a New Zealand fossil group. By 1966, the genus Iraqetrema had been synonymised with Etremopsis, leading to the addition of a living species to the genus, E. albata.

== Distribution ==
The sole extant species, E. albata, is known to occur in the Indian Ocean, including the Persian Gulf and western Thailand. Fossils are known to occur in Australia and New Zealand, with the earliest known fossils date to the Duntroonian stage of the Oligocene in New Zealand, dating to 27.3 million years ago.

== Species ==
Species within the genus Etremopsis include:

- †Etremopsis aequisculpta A. W. B. Powell, 1942
- Etremopsis albata (E. A. Smith, 1882)
- †Etremopsis carinapex A. W. B. Powell, 1942
- †Etremopsis clifdenica A. W. B. Powell, 1942
- †Etremopsis compta A. W. B. Powell, 1942
- †Etremopsis contigua A. W. B. Powell, 1944
- †Etremopsis disposita Laws, 1944
- †Etremopsis duospiralis Laws, 1944
- †Etremopsis elata A. W. B. Powell, 1942
- †Etremopsis erecta A. W. B. Powell, 1942
- †Etremopsis haroldi A. W. B. Powell, 1942
- †Etremopsis imperfecta (Suter, 1917)
- †Etremopsis latiapex A. W. B. Powell, 1942
- †Etremopsis oamarutica A. W. B. Powell, 1942
- †Etremopsis opposita A. W. B. Powell, 1944
- †Etremopsis quadrispiralis A. W. B. Powell, 1942
