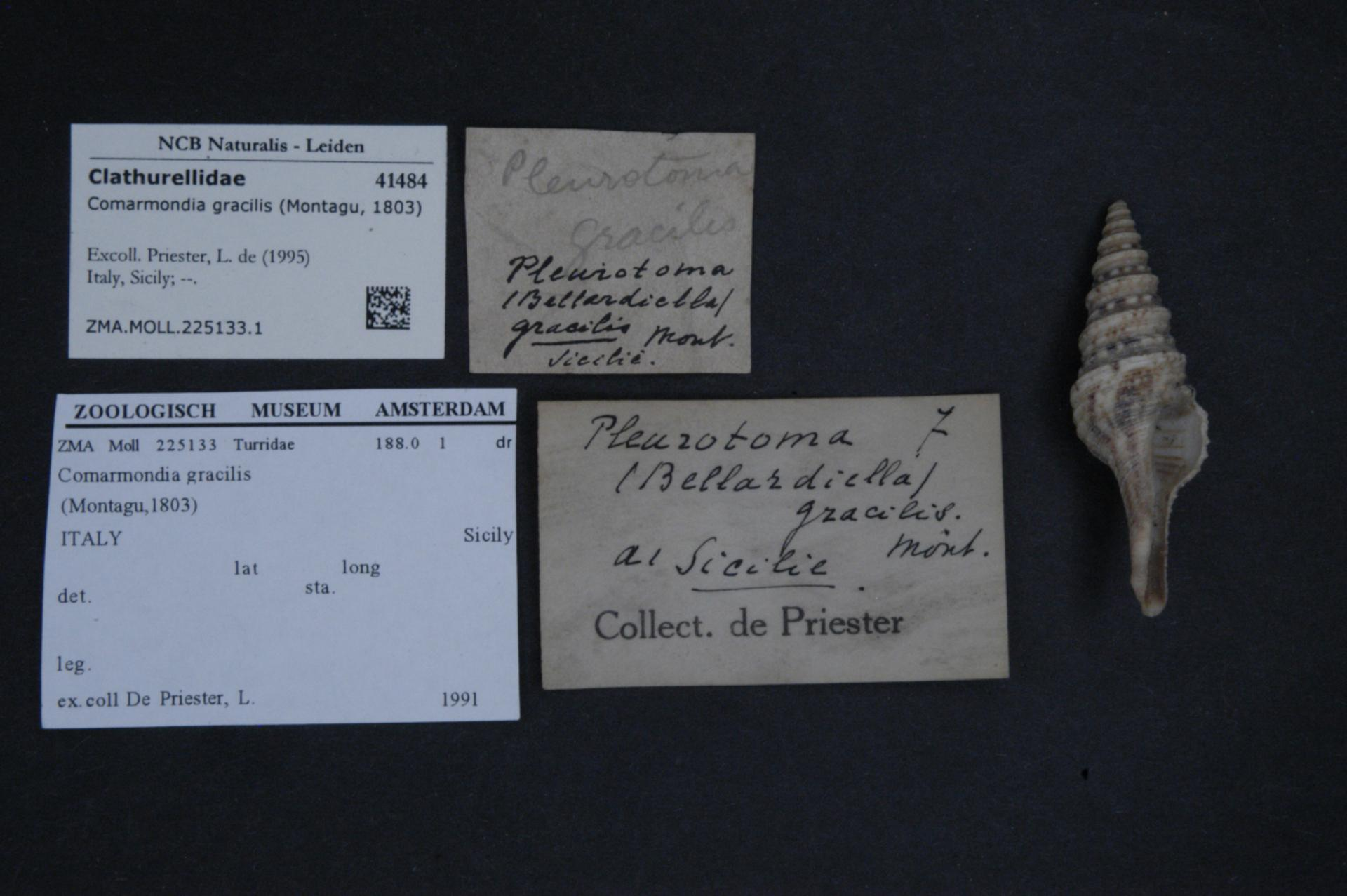
- Comarmondia gracilis

Scientific classification
- Kingdom: Animalia
- Phylum: Mollusca
- Class: Gastropoda
- Subclass: Caenogastropoda
- Order: Neogastropoda
- Family: Clathurellidae
- Genus: Comarmondia; Monterosato, 1884

= Comarmondia =

Genus of molluscs

Comarmondia is a genus of gastropods belonging to the family Clathurellidae.

The species of this genus are found in Europe and Africa.

Species:

- Comarmondia aequatorialis (Thiele, 1925)
- Comarmondia aethiopica (Thiele, 1925)
- Comarmondia gracilis (Montagu, 1803)
- Comarmondia inflex (Thiele, 1925)
- Comarmondia pamina (Thiele, 1925)
- Comarmondia paulula (Thiele, 1925)
- Comarmondia salaamensis (Thiele, 1925)
- Comarmondia suahelica (Thiele, 1925)
- Comarmondia suleica (Thiele, 1925)
- Comarmondia sultana (Thiele, 1925)
- Comarmondia ulla (Thiele, 1925)
- Comarmondia vana (Thiele, 1925)
