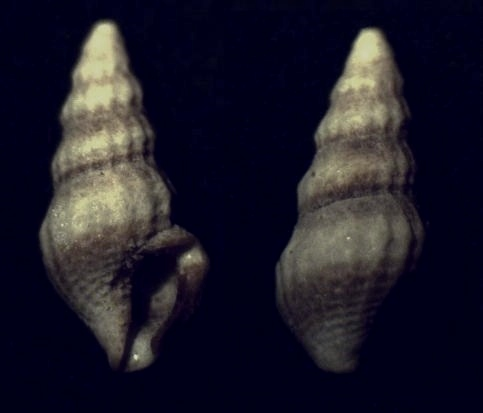
- Nannodiella vespuciana

Scientific classification
- Kingdom: Animalia
- Phylum: Mollusca
- Class: Gastropoda
- Subclass: Caenogastropoda
- Order: Neogastropoda
- Superfamily: Conoidea
- Family: Clathurellidae
- Genus: Nannodiella; Dall, 1919

Type species
- Philbertia (Nannodiella) nana Dall, 1919

Species
- See text

Synonyms
- Philbertia (Nannodiella) Dall, 1919 (original rank)

= Nannodiella =

Genus of gastropods

Nannodiella is a genus of sea snails, marine gastropod mollusks in the family Clathurellidae.

== Species ==
Species within the genus Nannodiella include:

- Nannodiella acricula (Hedley, 1922)
- Nannodiella baracoesa Espinosa, Ortea & Moro, 2017
- Nannodiella candidula (Reeve, 1846)
- Nannodiella cubadiella Espinosa, Ortea & Moro, 2017
- Nannodiella elatior (d'Orbigny, 1847)
- Nannodiella fraternalis (Dall, 1919)
- Nannodiella hukuiensis (Nomura & Niino, 1940)
- Nannodiella melanitica (Dall, 1901)
- Nannodiella nana (Dall, 1919)
- Nannodiella oxia (Bush, 1885)
- Nannodiella vespuciana (d'Orbigny, 1842)
