= Buridrillia =

Scientific classification
- Kingdom: Animalia
- Phylum: Mollusca
- Class: Gastropoda
- Subclass: Caenogastropoda
- Order: Neogastropoda
- Superfamily: Conoidea
- Family: Pseudomelatomidae
- Genus: Buridrillia; Olsson, 1942

Species
- See text

Genus of gastropods

Buridrillia is a genus of sea snails, marine gastropod mollusks in the family Pseudomelatomidae.

== Species ==
Species within the genus Buridrillia include:

- Buridrillia deroyorum Emerson & McLean, 1992
- † Buridrillia panarica (Olsson, 1942)
