= Crassispira adana =

Scientific classification
- Kingdom: Animalia
- Phylum: Mollusca
- Class: Gastropoda
- Subclass: Caenogastropoda
- Order: Neogastropoda
- Superfamily: Conoidea
- Family: Pseudomelatomidae
- Genus: Crassispira
- Species: C. adana

Binomial name
- Crassispira adana (Bartsch, 1950)

Synonyms
- Adanaclava adana Bartsch, 1950; Crassispira (Striospira) adana (Bartsch, 1950)

Species of gastropod

Crassispira adana is a species of sea snail, a marine gastropod mollusk in the family Pseudomelatomidae.

== Description ==
The length of the shell attains 12 mm.

== Distribution ==
This species occurs in the Pacific Ocean from Manzanillo, Mexico-to Panama
