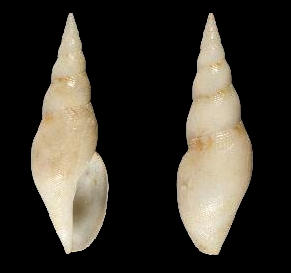
- Shell of Leiosyrinx liphaima

Scientific classification
- Kingdom: Animalia
- Phylum: Mollusca
- Class: Gastropoda
- Subclass: Caenogastropoda
- Order: Neogastropoda
- Superfamily: Conoidea
- Family: Raphitomidae
- Genus: Leiosyrinx; Bouchet & A. Sysoev, 2001

Type species
- Leiosyrinx immedicata Bouchet & A. Sysoev, 2001

Species
- See text

= Leiosyrinx =

Genus of gastropods

Leiosyrinx is a genus of sea snails, marine gastropod mollusks in the family Raphitomidae.

== Species ==
Species within the genus Leiosyrinx include:

- Leiosyrinx apheles Bouchet & Sysoev, 2001
- Leiosyrinx immedicata Bouchet & Sysoev, 2001
- Leiosyrinx liphaima Bouchet & Sysoev, 2001
- Leiosyrinx matsukumai Bouchet & Sysoev, 2001
