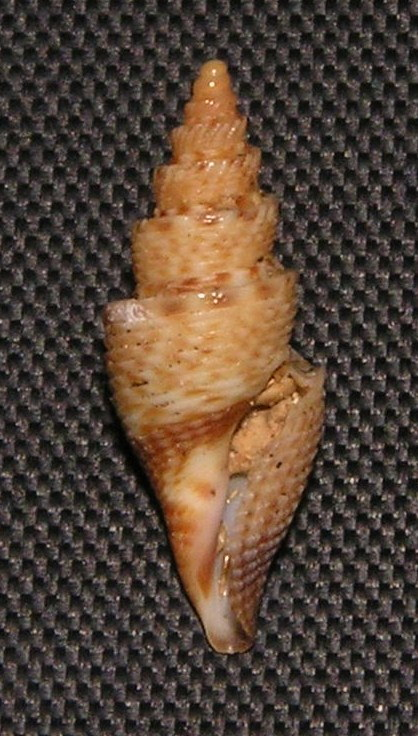
- Apertural view of a shell of the subspecies Tropidoturris fossata notialis

Scientific classification
- Kingdom: Animalia
- Phylum: Mollusca
- Class: Gastropoda
- Subclass: Caenogastropoda
- Order: Neogastropoda
- Superfamily: Conoidea
- Family: Borsoniidae
- Genus: Tropidoturris; Kilburn, 1986

Type species
- Pleurotoma scitecosta Sowerby III, 1903

= Tropidoturris =

Genus of gastropods

Tropidoturris is a genus of sea snails, marine gastropod mollusks in the family Borsoniidae.

== Description ==
The biconical shell shows spiral lirae, with or without strong axial ribs. The protoconch contains 1½ - 2 smooth whorls. The distinct shoulder angle is usually very strong and crenellated by axials (when present). The columella shows a thin callus but no pleats. The outer lip is thin. The anal sinus is deep and wide. The small, translucent operculum has an oblanceolate shape and a terminal nucleus.

== Distribution ==
This marine species is endemic to south-eastern Africa

== Species ==
- Tropidoturris anaglypta Kilburn, 1986
- Tropidoturris fossata (Sowerby III, 1903)
- Tropidoturris planilirata Kilburn, 1986
- Tropidoturris scitecosta (Sowerby III, 1903)
- Tropidoturris simplicicingula (Barnard, 1958)
- Tropidoturris vizcondei Morassi & Bonfitto, 2013
