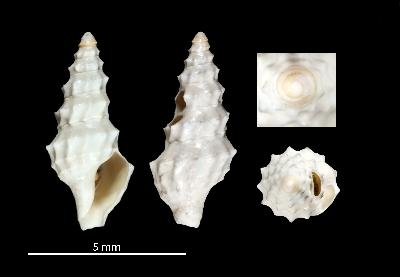
- Shells of Corinnaeturris angularis (paratype at MNHN, Paris)

Scientific classification
- Kingdom: Animalia
- Phylum: Mollusca
- Class: Gastropoda
- Subclass: Caenogastropoda
- Order: Neogastropoda
- Superfamily: Conoidea
- Family: Clathurellidae
- Genus: Corinnaeturris; Bouchet & Warén, 1980

Type species
- Pleurotoma leucomata Dall, 1881

Species
- See text

= Corinnaeturris =

Genus of gastropods

Corinnaeturris is a genus of sea snails, marine gastropod mollusks in the family Clathurellidae.

== Species ==
Species within the genus Corinnaeturris include:

- Corinnaeturris angularis Figueira & Absalão, 2010
- Corinnaeturris humilis E. F. García, 2024
- Corinnaeturris leucomata (Dall, 1881)
- Corinnaeturris rhysa (Watson, 1881)
