= Abyssothauma =

Scientific classification
- Kingdom: Animalia
- Phylum: Mollusca
- Class: Gastropoda
- Subclass: Caenogastropoda
- Order: Neogastropoda
- Superfamily: Conoidea
- Family: Raphitomidae
- Genus: Abyssothauma; Kantor & Sysoev, 1986

Type species
- Moniliopsis psilarosis Barnard, 1963

Species
- See text

Genus of gastropods

Abyssothauma is a genus of sea snails, marine gastropod mollusks in the family Raphitomidae.

== Species ==
Species within the genus Abyssothauma include:

- Abyssothauma psilarosis (Barnard, 1963)
