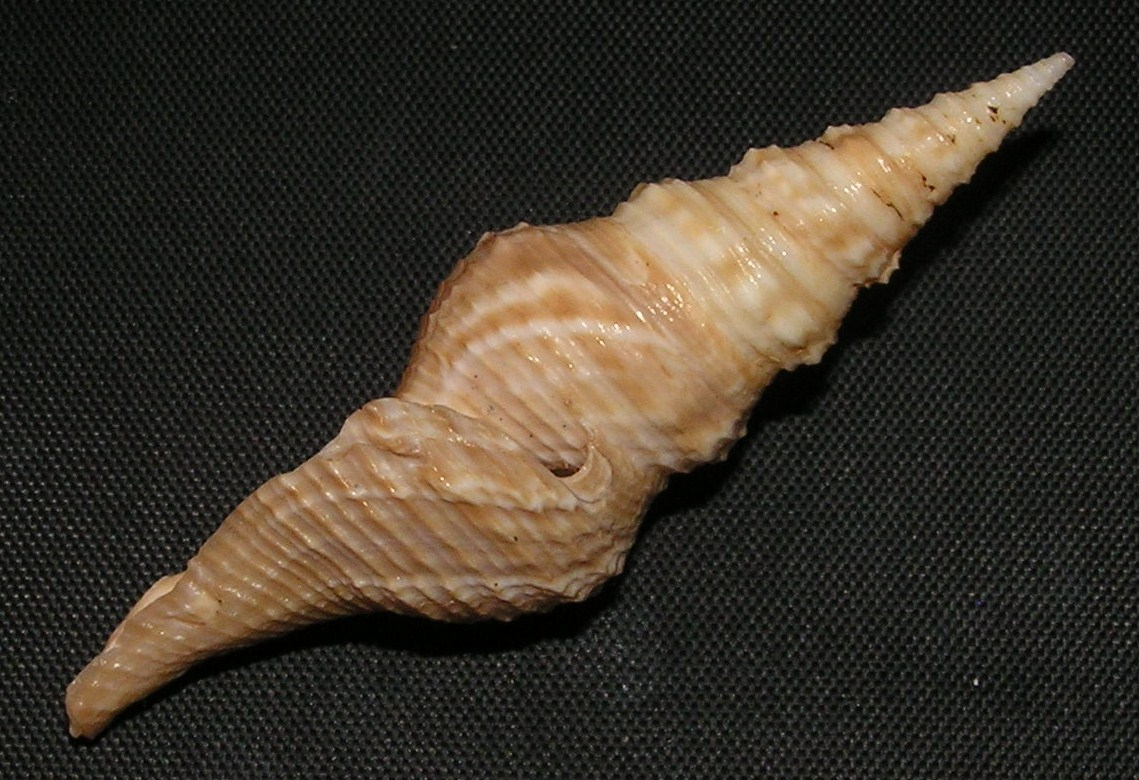
- Shell of Cruziturricula arcuata

Scientific classification
- Kingdom: Animalia
- Phylum: Mollusca
- Class: Gastropoda
- Subclass: Caenogastropoda
- Order: Neogastropoda
- Superfamily: Conoidea
- Family: Drilliidae
- Genus: Cruziturricula; Marks, 1951

Type species
- † Turricula (Pleurafusia) cruziana Olsson

Species
- See text

= Cruziturricula =

Genus of gastropods

Cruziturricula is a genus of sea snails, marine gastropod mollusks in the family Drilliidae.

== Species ==
Species within the genus Cruziturricula include:

- Cruziturricula arcuata (Reeve, 1843)

Species brought into synonymy

- Cruziturricula panthea (Dall, 1919): synonym of Cruziturricula arcuata (Reeve, 1843)
