= Strombinoturris =

Scientific classification
- Kingdom: Animalia
- Phylum: Mollusca
- Class: Gastropoda
- Subclass: Caenogastropoda
- Order: Neogastropoda
- Superfamily: Conoidea
- Family: Clathurellidae
- Genus: Strombinoturris; Hertlein & Strong, 1951

Type species
- Strombinoturris crockeri Hertlein & Strong, 1951

Species
- See text

Genus of gastropods

Strombinoturris is a genus of sea snails, marine gastropod mollusks in the family Clathurellidae.

== Species ==
Species within the genus Strombinoturris include:

- Strombinoturris crockeri Hertlein & Strong, 1951
