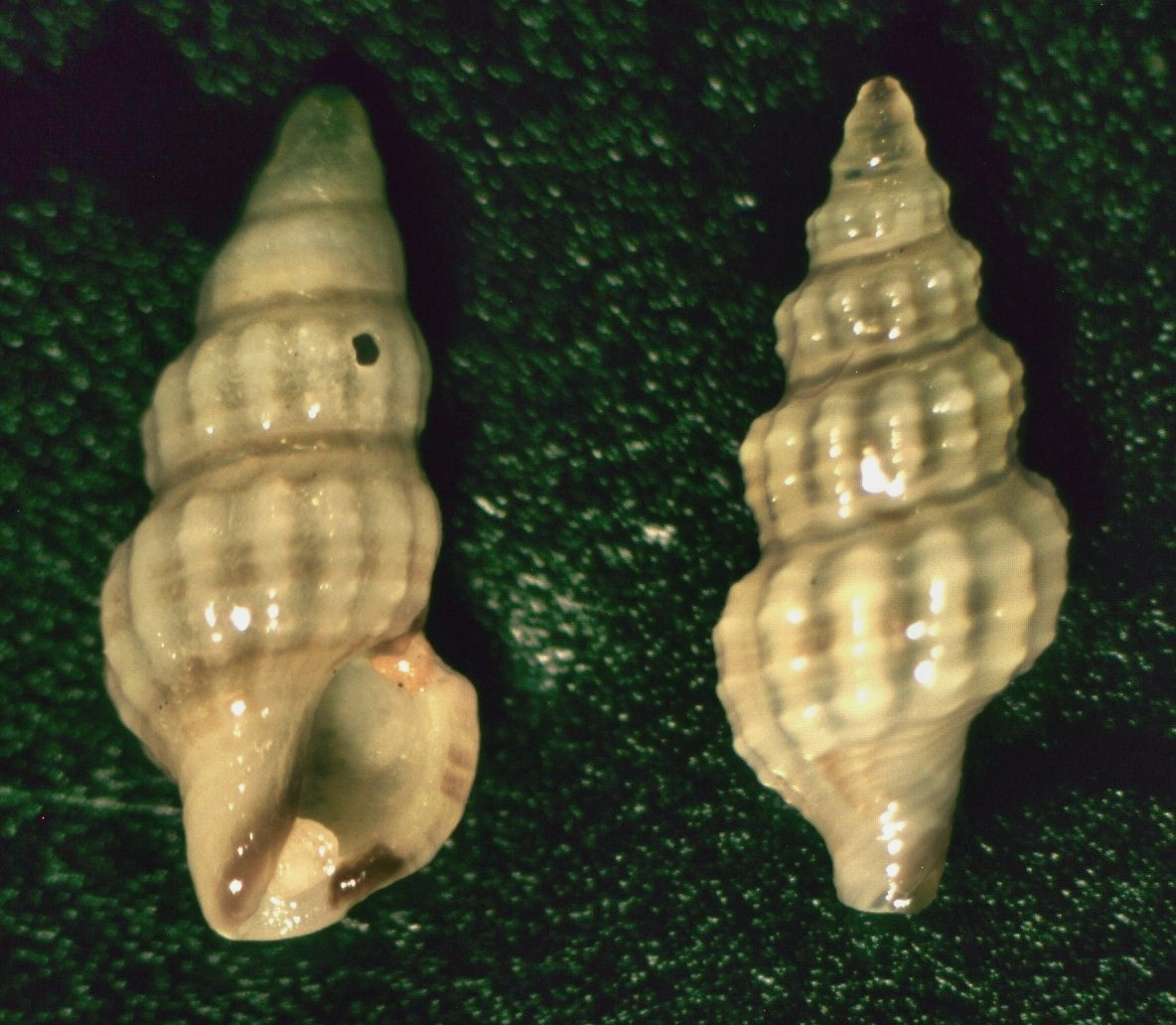
- Two shells of Etrema bicolor

Scientific classification
- Kingdom: Animalia
- Phylum: Mollusca
- Class: Gastropoda
- Subclass: Caenogastropoda
- Order: Neogastropoda
- Superfamily: Conoidea
- Family: Clathurellidae; H. Adams & A. Adams, 1858

Genera
- See text

= Clathurellidae =

Family of gastropods

Clathurellidae is a monophyletic family of small to medium-sized sea snails, marine gastropod mollusks in the superfamily Conoidea.

== Taxonomy ==
=== 2005 taxonomy ===
In the taxonomy of the Gastropoda by Bouchet & Rocroi (2005) Clathurellinae was classified as a subfamily of Conidae.

=== 2011 taxonomy ===
In 2011 Bouchet, Kantor et al. brought some genera from the subfamily Clathurellinae (at that point belonging to the family Conidae) in a new family, Clathurellidae. This was based on anatomical characters and a dataset of molecular sequences of three gene fragments.

== Description ==
Species in this family have small to medium-sized fusiform shells that have strong sculpture. The apex is mammillary. The anal sinus is varicose, and touches the sutural ramp. The columella is tuberculated posterior, rugose in front. It lacks columellar pleats. The siphonal canal is slightly curved, and varies in length between short to moderately long (as in Glyphostoma rostrata). The operculum is always absent in this family.

The family Clathurellidae appears to differ from the family Mangeliidae principally in its more rounded whorls and cancellate sculpture.

== Genera ==
Genera within the family Clathurellidae include:

- Acrista Hedley, 1922
- Adanaclava Bartsch, 1950
- Clathurella Carpenter, 1857
- Comarmondia Monterosato, 1884 - synonyms: Bellardia Bucquoy, Dautzenberg & Dollfus, 1883; Bellardiella P. Fischer, 1883; Bellatula Strand, 1929
- Corinnaeturris Bouchet & Warén, 1980
- Crockerella Hertlein & Strong, 1951
- Etrema Hedley, 1918 - synonym: Iraqetrema Dance & Eames, 1966
- Etremopa Oyama, 1953
- Etremopsis Powell, 1942
- Euclathurella Woodring, 1928
- Euglyphostoma Woodring, 1970
- Glyphostoma Gabb, 1873
- Glyphostomops Bartsch, 1934
- Lienardia Jousseaume, 1884
- Nannodiella Dall, 1919
- Paraclathurella Boettger, 1895
- Pleurotomoides Bronn, 1831
- Pseudoetrema Oyama, 1953
- Strombinoturris Hertlein & Strong, 1951
- Turrella Laseron, 1954

Genera brought into synonymy

- Bellardia Bucquoy, Dautzenberg & Dollfus, 1883: synonym of Comarmondia Monterosato, 1884
- Bellardiella P. Fischer, 1883: synonym of Comarmondia Monterosato, 1884
- Bellatula Strand, 1929: synonym of Comarmondia Monterosato, 1884
- Clathromangilia: synonym of Clathromangelia Monterosato, 1884
- Iraqetrema Dance & Eames, 1966: synonym of Etrema Hedley, 1918
