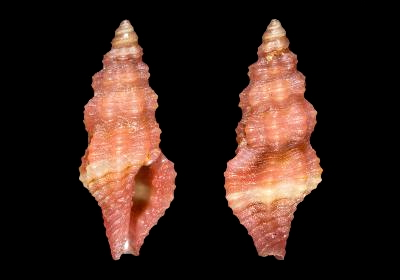
- Shell of Lienardia roseangulata (holotype in MNHN, Paris)

Scientific classification
- Kingdom: Animalia
- Phylum: Mollusca
- Class: Gastropoda
- Subclass: Caenogastropoda
- Order: Neogastropoda
- Superfamily: Conoidea
- Family: Clathurellidae
- Genus: Lienardia; Jousseaume, 1883

Type species
- Clavatula rubida Hinds, 1843

Species
- See text

Synonyms
- Lienardia (Acrista) Hedley, 1922· accepted, alternate representation; Lienardia (Lienardia)

= Lienardia =

Genus of gastropods

Lienardia is a genus of sea snails, marine gastropod mollusks in the family Clathurellidae.

== Species ==
- Lienardia acrolineata Fedosov, 2011
- Lienardia armstrongi (G. Nevill & H. Nevill, 1875)
- Lienardia biplicata (Melvill, 1906)
- Lienardia calathiscus (Melvill & Standen, 1896)
- Lienardia cardinalis (Reeve, 1845)
- Lienardia cincta (Dunker, 1871)
- Lienardia coccinea (Anton, 1838)
- Lienardia colini T. Cossignani, 2022
- Lienardia comideleuca (Melvill & Standen, 1903)
- Lienardia compta (Reeve, 1845)
- Lienardia corticea Hedley, 1922
- Lienardia crassicostata (Pease, 1860)
- Lienardia crebrilirata (E. A. Smith, 1884)
- Lienardia cremonilla (Melvill & Standen, 1895)
- Lienardia crosseana (Hervier, 1896)
- Lienardia disconica (Hervier, 1896)
- Lienardia exilirata Rehder, 1980
- Lienardia exquisita (Nevill & Nevill, 1875)
- Lienardia fallaciosa Hedley, 1922
- Lienardia fallax (Nevill & Nevill, 1875)
- Lienardia falsaria Hedley, 1922
- Lienardia farsilis Hedley, 1922
- Lienardia fatima (Thiele, 1925)
- Lienardia gaidei (Hervier, 1896)
- Lienardia giliberti (Souverbie in Souverbie & Montrouzier, 1874)
- Lienardia gracilis Hedley, 1922
- Lienardia grandiradula Fedosov, 2011
- Lienardia gravelyi Winckworth, 1940
- † Lienardia hayasakai Nomura, 1935
- Lienardia immaculata (E. A. Smith, 1876)
- Lienardia innocens (Thiele, 1925)
- Lienardia koyamai Bozzetti, 2007
- Lienardia lischkeana (Pilsbry, 1904)
- † Lienardia mariae (Koenen, 1872)
- Lienardia mauiensis Wiedrick, 2025
- Lienardia mighelsi Iredale & Tomlin, 1917
- Lienardia multicolor Fedosov, 2011
- Lienardia multinoda Hedley, 1922
- Lienardia nigrotincta (Montrouzier in Souverbie & Montrouzier, 1873)
- Lienardia obtusicostata (E. A. Smith, 1882)
- Lienardia olowaluensis Wiedrick, 2025
- Lienardia periscelina Hedley, 1922
- Lienardia perplexa (Nevill & Nevill, 1875)
- Lienardia planilabrum (Reeve, 1846)
- Lienardia pulchripicta (Melvill & Standen, 1901)
- Lienardia purpurata (Souverbie, 1860)
- Lienardia ralla Hedley, 1922
- Lienardia rhodacme (Melvill & Standen, 1896)
- Lienardia rigida (Hinds, 1843)
- Lienardia roseangulata Fedosov, 2011
- Lienardia roseocincta (W. R. B. Oliver, 1915)
- Lienardia roseotincta (Montrouzier in Souverbie & Montrouzier, 1872)
- Lienardia rubida (Hinds, 1843)
- Lienardia sainakanoi Poppe, 2025
- Lienardia semilineata (Garrett, 1873)
- Lienardia siren (E. A. Smith, 1904)
- Lienardia spengleri Stahlschmidt, 2015
- Lienardia strombilla (Hervier, 1896)
- Lienardia tagaroae Fedosov, 2011
- Lienardia thalera (Melvill & Standen, 1896)
- Lienardia vultuosa (Reeve, 1845)

Species brought into synonymy

- Subgenus Lienardia (Hemilienardia) Boettger, 1895: synonym of Hemilienardia O. Boettger, 1895
- Subgenus Lienardia (Lienardia): synonym of Lienardia Jousseaume, 1883
- Lienardia (Lienardia) rubida (Hinds, 1843): synonym of Lienardia rubida (Hinds, 1843)
- Lienardia apiculata (Montrouzier in Souverbie & Montrouzier, 1864): synonym of Hemilienardia apiculata (Montrouzier, 1864)
- Lienardia balteata (Pease, 1860): synonym of Hemilienardia balteata (Pease, 1860)
- Lienardia caelata (Garrett, 1873): synonym of Pseudodaphnella caelata (Garrett, 1873) (superseded combination)
- Lienardia calcicincta (Melvill & Standen, 1895): synonym of Hemilienardia calcicincta (Melvill & Standen, 1895)
- Lienardia chrysoleuca Melvill, 1923: synonym of Hemilienardia chrysoleuca (Melvill, 1923) (original combination)
- Lienardia cosmia Winckworth, 1940: synonym of Etrema cosmia (Winckworth, 1940) (superseded combination)
- Lienardia curculio (Nevill & Nevill, 1869): synonym of Etrema curculio (G. Nevill & H. Nevill, 1870)
- Lienardia ecprepes Melvill, 1927: synonym of Hemilienardia ecprepes (Melvill, 1927) (original combination)
- Lienardia fenestrata (Melvill, 1898): synonym of Hemilienardia fenestrata (Melvill, 1898)
- Lienardia fuscolineolata Kuroda & Oyama, 1971: synonym of Clathurella fuscolineolata (Kuroda & Oyama, 1971) (superseded combination)
- Lienardia goubini (Hervier, 1896): synonym of Hemilienardia goubini (Hervier, 1896)
- Lienardia granulifera Schepman, 1913: synonym of Glyphostoma granulifera (Schepman, 1913) (original combination)
- Lienardia grayi (Reeve, 1845): synonym of Clathurella grayi (Reeve, 1845)
- Lienardia hadfieldi (Melvill & Standen, 1895): synonym of Pseudodaphnella hadfieldi (Melvill & Standen, 1895)
- Lienardia hersilia (Hedley, 1922): synonym of Hemilienardia hersilia Hedley, 1922
- Lienardia homochroa (Hedley, 1922): synonym of Hemilienardia homochroa Hedley, 1922
- Lienardia idiomorpha (Hervier, 1897): synonym of Hemilienardia idiomorpha (Hervier, 1897) (superseded combination)
- Lienardia malleti (Récluz, 1852): synonym of Hemilienardia malleti (Récluz, 1852)
- Lienardia marchei Jousseaume, 1884: synonym of Pseudodaphnella marchei (Jousseaume, 1884)
- Lienardia morsura (Hedley, 1899): synonym of Thetidos morsura Hedley, 1899
- Lienardia nigrocincta (Souverbie & Montrouzier, 1873): synonym of Lienardia nigrotincta (Montrouzier in Souverbie & Montrouzier, 1873)
- Lienardia obockensis Jousseaume, 1888: synonym of Cronia obockensis (Jousseaume, 1888) (original combination)
- Lienardia ocellata Jousseaume, 1883: synonym of Hemilienardia ocellata (Jousseaume, 1883) (original combination)
- Lienardia peristernioides Schepman, 1913: synonym of Clathurella peristernioides (Schepman, 1913) (original combination)
- Lienardia punctilla Hedley, 1922: synonym of Acrista punctilla (Hedley, 1922) (superseded combination)
- Lienardia purpurascens (Dunker, 1871): synonym of Hemilienardia purpurascens (Dunker, 1871)
- Lienardia rosella Hedley, 1922: synonym of Clathurella rosella (Hedley, 1922) (superseded combination)
- Lienardia rubicunda (Gould, 1860): synonym of Hemilienardia rubicunda (Gould, 1860)
- Lienardia rugosa (Mighels, 1845): synonym of Lienardia mighelsi Iredale & Tomlin, 1917
- Lienardia thyridota (Melvill & Standen, 1896): synonym of Hemilienardia thyridota (Melvill & Standen, 1896)
- [Lienardia totopotens Rosenberg & Stahlschmidt, 2011: synonym of Clathurella totopotens (Rosenberg & Stahlschmidt, 2011) (superseded combination)
- Lienardia tricolor (Brazier, 1876): synonym of Clathurella tricolor Brazier, 1876 (superseded combination)
- Lienardia vadososinuata Nomura & Niino, 1940: synonym of Clathranachis japonica (A. Adams, 1860) (junior subjective synonym)
