= Hemilienardia minor =

Scientific classification
- Kingdom: Animalia
- Phylum: Mollusca
- Class: Gastropoda
- Subclass: Caenogastropoda
- Order: Neogastropoda
- Superfamily: Conoidea
- Family: Raphitomidae
- Genus: Hemilienardia
- Species: H. minor

Binomial name
- Hemilienardia minor (G. Nevill & H. Nevill, 1875)

Synonyms
- Clathurella apiculata minor G. Nevill & H. Nevill, 1875 (original combination)

Species of gastropod

Hemilienardia minor is a species of sea snail, a marine gastropod mollusk in the family Raphitomidae.

== Description ==
The length of the shell attains 4½ mm, its diameter 1¾ mm.

(Original description) it can only be distinguished from Hemilienardia apiculata (Montrouzier in Souverbie & Montrouzier, 1864) which has not yet been found at the Andamans, by its smaller size The row of opaque, white spots on the back of the body whorl are very characteristic. It is nearest allied to Hemilienardia malleti (Récluz, 1852) which also lives at the Andamans and under precisely similar conditions.

== Distribution ==
This marine species occurs off the Andaman Islands
