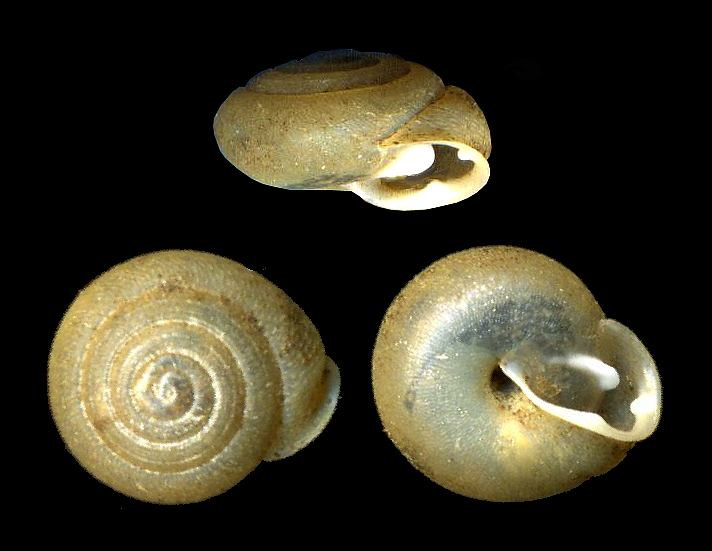
- Three views of a shell of Trilobopsis loricata

Conservation status
- Imperiled (NatureServe)

Scientific classification
- Kingdom: Animalia
- Phylum: Mollusca
- Class: Gastropoda
- Order: Stylommatophora
- Family: Polygyridae
- Genus: Trilobopsis
- Species: T. loricata

Binomial name
- Trilobopsis loricata (Gould, 1846)
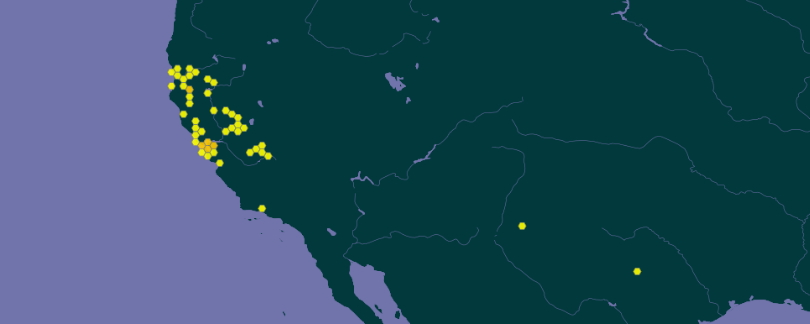

Synonyms
- Helix loricata A. Gould, 1846 (original combination)

= Trilobopsis loricata =

Species of gastropod

Trilobopsis loricata is a species of air-breathing land snail, a terrestrial pulmonate gastropod mollusk in the family Polygyridae.

== Subspecies ==
- Trilobopsis loricata lowei (Pilsbry, 1925)
- Trilobopsis loricata mariposa Pilsbry, 1940
- Trilobopsis loricata nortensis (Berry, 1933)
- Trilobopsis loricata perforata Pilsbry, 1940
- Trilobopsis loricata sonomaensis (Hemphill, 1911)
- Trilobopsis loricata perforata Pilsbry, 1940: synonym of Trilobopsis trachypepla (S. S. Berry, 1933)

== Distribution ==
This species occurs in the United States of America, mainly in California.
