= Turbonilla torquata =

Scientific classification
- Kingdom: Animalia
- Phylum: Mollusca
- Class: Gastropoda
- Family: Pyramidellidae
- Genus: Turbonilla
- Species: T. torquata

Binomial name
- Turbonilla torquata (Gould, 1853)

Species of gastropod

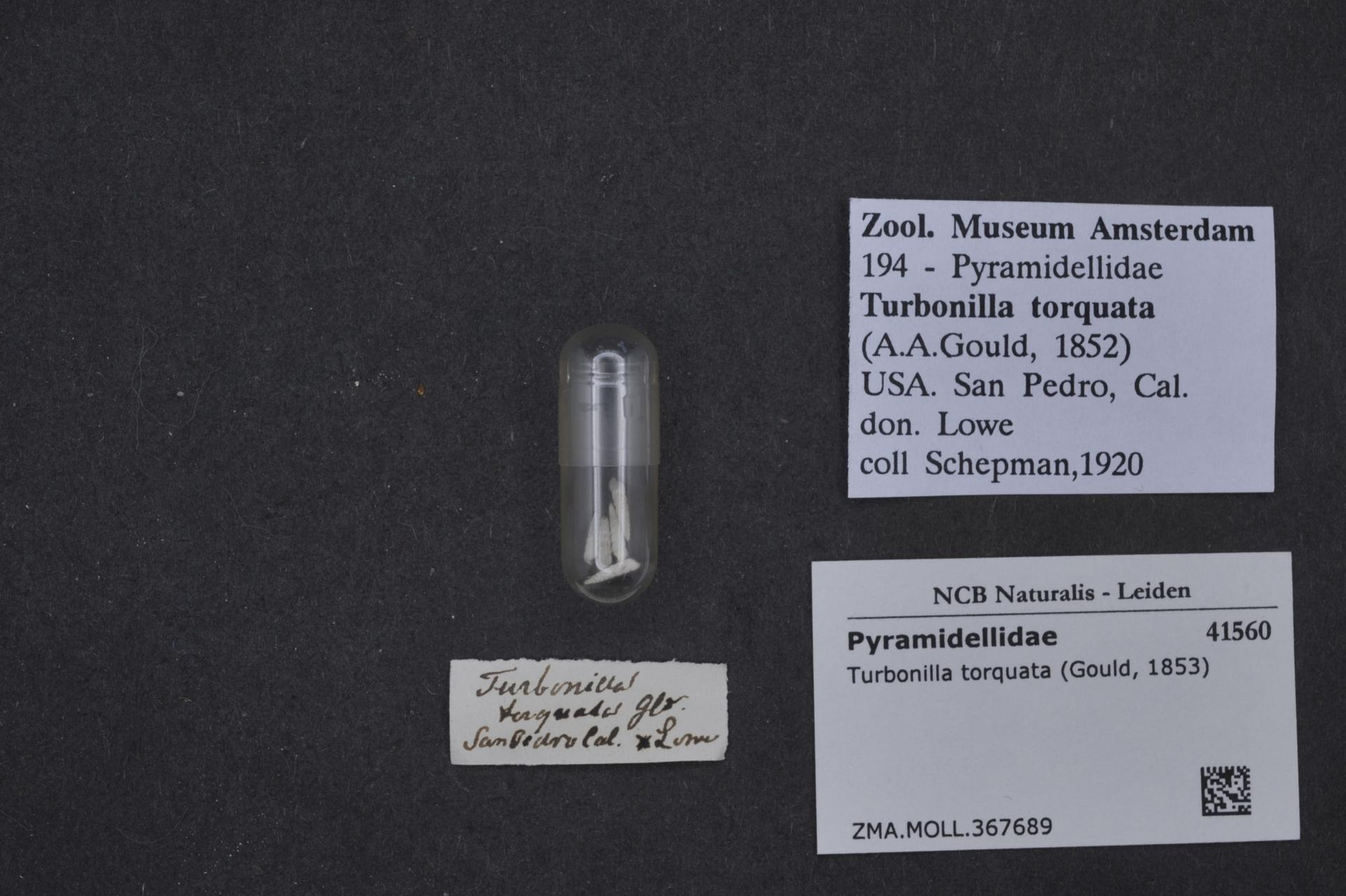
Turbonilla torquata

Turbonilla torquata is a species of sea snail, a marine gastropod mollusk in the family Pyramidellidae, the pyrams and their allies.
