= Alvania quadrata =

Scientific classification
- Kingdom: Animalia
- Phylum: Mollusca
- Class: Gastropoda
- Subclass: Caenogastropoda
- Order: Littorinimorpha
- Superfamily: Rissooidea
- Family: Rissoidae
- Genus: Alvania
- Species: A. quadrata

Binomial name
- Alvania quadrata A. Gould, 1861

Species of gastropod

Alvania quadrata is a species of small sea snail, a marine gastropod mollusk or micromollusk in the family Rissoidae.

== Description ==
The length of the shell attains 1.6 mm, its diameter 0.8 mm.

(Original description in Latin) The very minute, lanceolate shell is white. It contains four squarely stitched whorls. The sculpture consists of circ. 16 ribs and three spiral riblets with three more on the base of the shell. The aperture is suboval. The outer lip is thickened.

== Distribution ==
This species occurs in Chinese seas.
