= Raphitoma dempsta =

Scientific classification
- Kingdom: Animalia
- Phylum: Mollusca
- Class: Gastropoda
- Subclass: Caenogastropoda
- Order: Neogastropoda
- Superfamily: Conoidea
- Family: Raphitomidae
- Genus: Raphitoma
- Species: R. dempsta

Binomial name
- Raphitoma dempsta (A.A. Gould, 1860)

Synonyms
- Daphnella dempsta (A.A. Gould, 1860); Mangelia dempsta A.A. Gould, 1860

Species of gastropod

Raphitoma dempsta is a species of sea snail, a marine gastropod mollusk in the family Raphitomidae.

== Description ==
The length of the shell reaches 3 mm, its diameter 1 mm.

The white, minute, short shell has a rhomboid-fusiform shape and contains six whorls. The shell shows eight conspicuous ribs and dense, spiral threads. The body whorl measures half the total length. The aperture is long and narrow. The outer lip is sharp and incrassate posteriorly. The short siphonal canal is wide.

== Distribution ==
This marine species occurs in the South China Seas.
