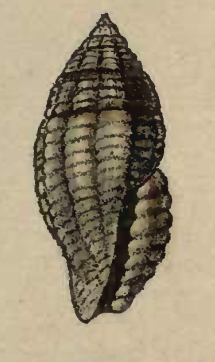
- Drawing of a shell of Hemilienardia albostrigata

Scientific classification
- Kingdom: Animalia
- Phylum: Mollusca
- Class: Gastropoda
- Subclass: Caenogastropoda
- Order: Neogastropoda
- Superfamily: Conoidea
- Family: Raphitomidae
- Genus: Hemilienardia
- Species: H. albostrigata

Binomial name
- Hemilienardia albostrigata (Baird, 1873)

Synonyms
- Clathurella albostrigata (Baird, 1873); Defrancia albostrigata Baird, 1873 (original combination); Mangilia (Glyphostoma) notopyrrha Melvill and Standen, 1896

= Hemilienardia albostrigata =

Species of gastropod

Hemilienardia albostrigata is a species of sea snail, a marine gastropod mollusk in the family Raphitomidae.

== Description ==
The length of the shell varies between 3 mm and 8 mm.

The shell is whitish or light yellowish brown, marked on the back of the body whorl with a pure white chalky-looking band, and in some instances with an interrupted band of brown.

This is a pure-white turreted little species, with a conspicuous dorsal squarrose brown spot just below the suture of the body whorl. The whorls are ventricose and ribbed longitudinally, crossed with a few conspicuous lirae. The outer lip is much thickened with large denticles on the inner surface, and the columella is toothed.

It differs from Hemilienardia apiculata (Montrouzier in Souverbie & Montrouzier, 1864) by the presence of a brown spot on the edge of the body whorl.

== Distribution ==
This marine species occurs off New Caledonia and Queensland, Australia
