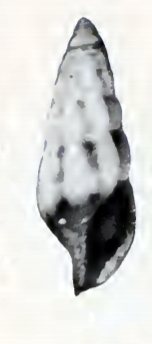
- Original image of a shell of Mangelia dorsuosa

Scientific classification
- Kingdom: Animalia
- Phylum: Mollusca
- Class: Gastropoda
- Subclass: Caenogastropoda
- Order: Neogastropoda
- Superfamily: Conoidea
- Family: Mangeliidae
- Genus: Mangelia
- Species: M. dorsuosa

Binomial name
- Mangelia dorsuosa (A.A. Gould, 1860)

Synonyms
- Columbella (Anachis) dorsuosa Gould, 1860

= Mangelia dorsuosa =

Species of gastropod

Mangelia dorsuosa is a species of sea snail, a marine gastropod mollusk in the family Mangeliidae.

== Description ==
The length of the shell attains 6 mm, its diameter 2.2 mm.

== Distribution ==
This marine species occurs off Hong Kong.
