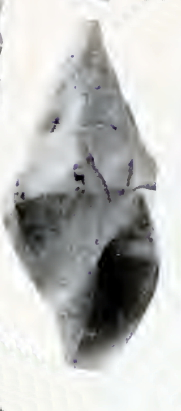
- Original image of a shell of Mangelia semiassa

Scientific classification
- Kingdom: Animalia
- Phylum: Mollusca
- Class: Gastropoda
- Subclass: Caenogastropoda
- Order: Neogastropoda
- Superfamily: Conoidea
- Family: Mangeliidae
- Genus: Mangelia
- Species: M. semiassa

Binomial name
- Mangelia semiassa A.A. Gould, 1860

= Mangelia semiassa =

Species of gastropod

Mangelia semiassa is a species of sea snail, a marine gastropod mollusk in the family Mangeliidae.

This is a taxon inquirendum.

== Description ==
It was first described by Augustus Addison Gould in 1860. The shell of this species typically reaches a length of about 8 mm and a diameter of 3 mm.

(Original description in Latin) The shell is rhomboid-fusiform, thick, and shiny. It is whitish but livid anteriorly. The shell is inscribed with 8 ribs and very fine revolving striae. There are 6 angular whorls, and the suture is impressed. The aperture is piriform and is half of the total length, tapering to a point anteriorly. The outer lip is simple and thickened, and the sinus is barely noticeable. The columella is straight and livid.

== Distribution ==
The type locality is unknown.
