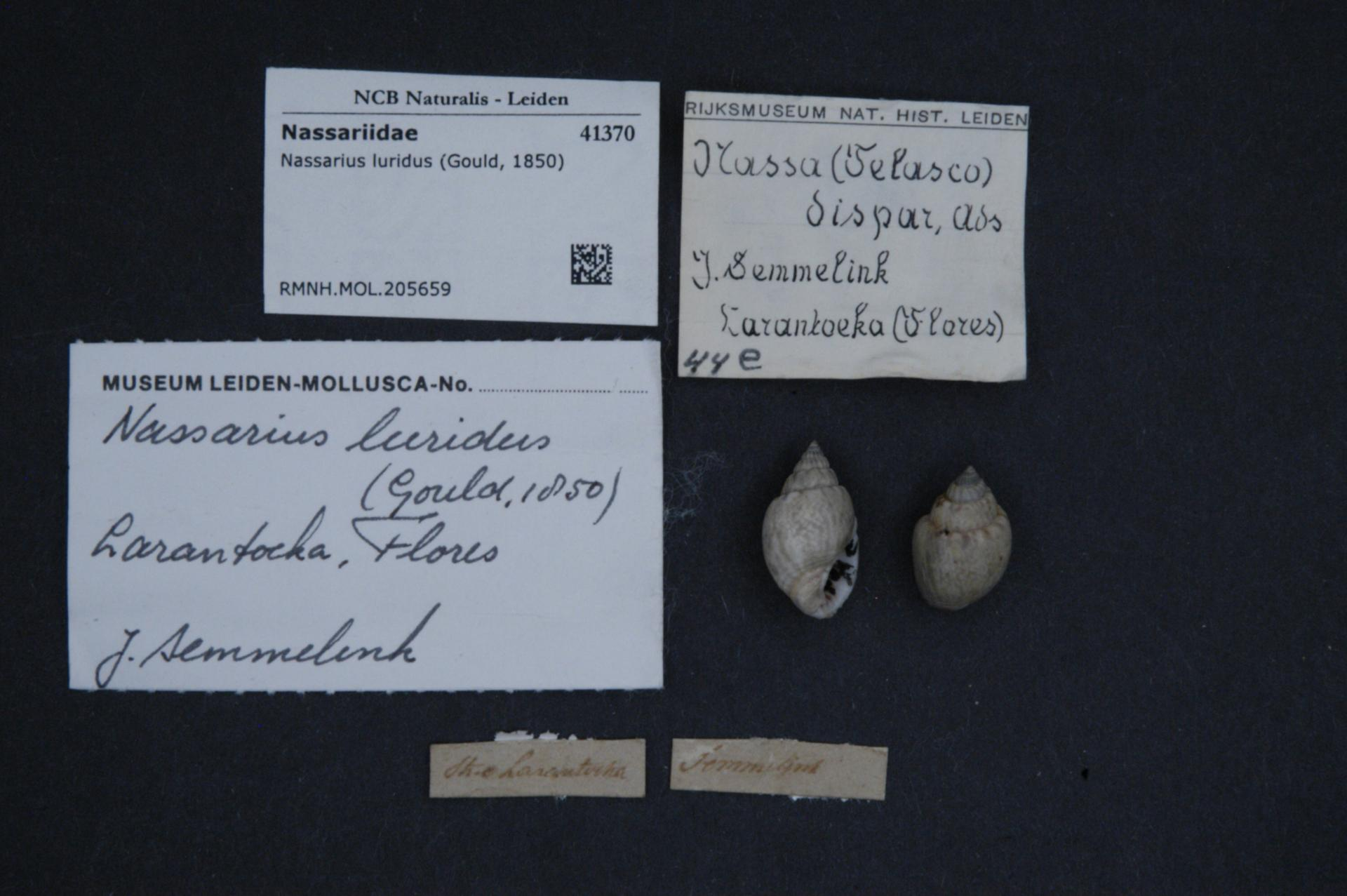

Scientific classification
- Kingdom: Animalia
- Phylum: Mollusca
- Class: Gastropoda
- Subclass: Caenogastropoda
- Order: Neogastropoda
- Family: Nassariidae
- Genus: Nassarius
- Species: N. luridus

Binomial name
- Nassarius luridus (Gould, 1850)

Synonyms
- Nassa (Alectryon) elegans fulgurans (f) Schepman, M.M., 1913; Nassa (Alectryon) lurida Gould, 1850; Nassa (Telasco) dispar A. Adams, 1852; Nassa (Zeuxis) lucida Gould, 1850; Nassa (Zeuxis) lurida Gould, 1850; Nassa dispar A. Adams, 1852; Nassa graphitera Rousseau, 1854; Nassa kieneri Deshayes, 1863; Nassa lurida Gould, 1850; Nassarius (Telasco) luridus (Gould, 1850); Nassarius kieneri Anton, 1957

= Nassarius luridus =

Species of gastropod

Nassarius luridus is a species of sea snail, a marine gastropod mollusk in the family Nassariidae, the Nassa mud snails or dog whelks.

== Description ==
The shell length varies between 12 mm and 20 mm.

== Distribution ==
This species occurs in the Indo-West Pacific off Indonesia.
