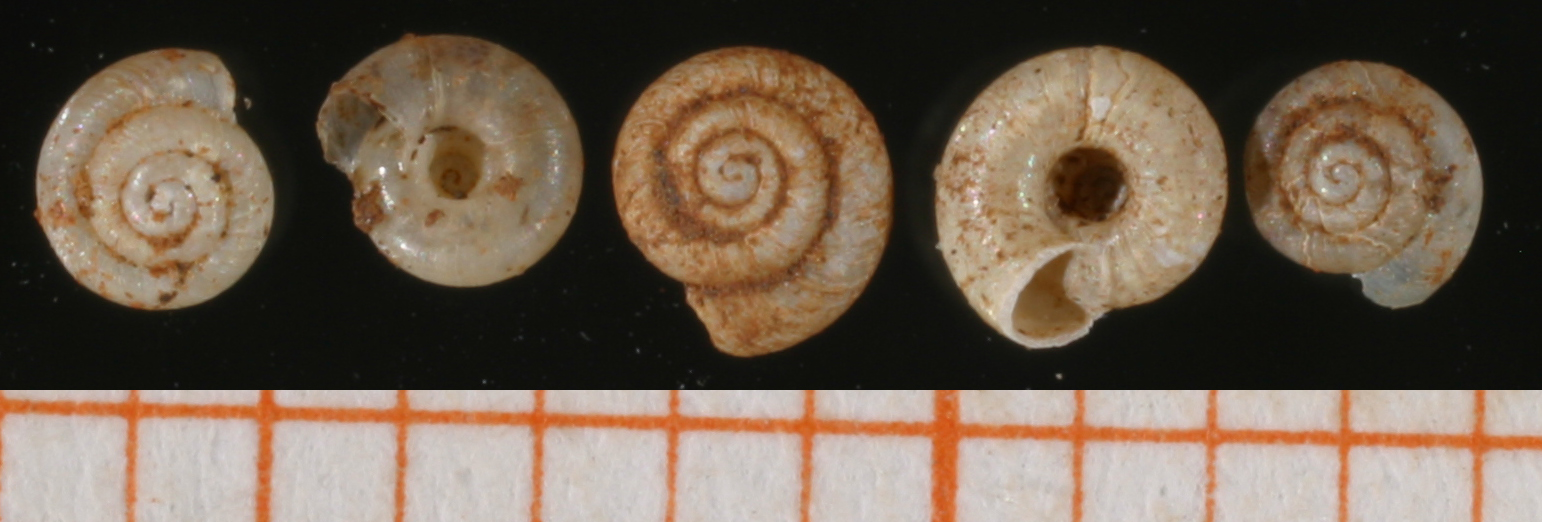
- Five shells of Hawaiia minuscula, scale bar in millimeters

Scientific classification
- Kingdom: Animalia
- Phylum: Mollusca
- Class: Gastropoda
- Order: Stylommatophora
- Family: Pristilomatidae
- Genus: Hawaiia; Gude, 1911

Type species
- Helix kawaiensis Reeve, 1854

Species
- H. alachuana (Dall, 1885); H. antiqua Riedel, 1963; H. minuscula (Binney, 1841); H. neomexicana (Cockerell & Pilsbry, 1900); H. pentagyra (Pilsbry, 1907)

Synonyms
- Johannesoconcha Preston, 1913; Macgillivrayella Preston, 1913; Pseudovitrea Baker, 1928

= Hawaiia =

Genus of gastropods

Hawaiia is a genus of small land snails in the family Pristilomatidae.

== Species ==
The genus Hawaiia includes the following species:

- Hawaiia alachuana (Dall, 1885)
- Hawaiia antiqua Riedel, 1963
- Hawaiia minuscula (Binney, 1841)
- Hawaiia neomexicana (Cockerell & Pilsbry, 1900)
- Hawaiia pentagyra (Pilsbry, 1907)
