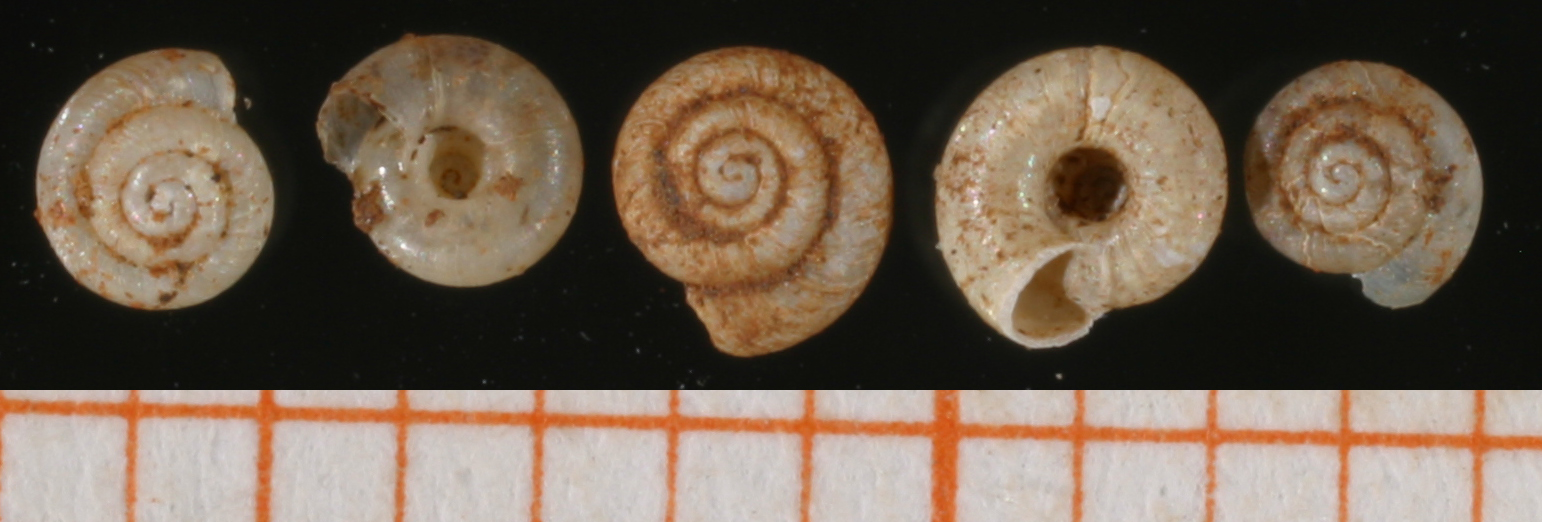
- Five shells of Hawaiia minuscula, scale bar in millimeters

Conservation status
- Data Deficient (IUCN 3.1) (Europe regional assessment)

- Secure (NatureServe)

Scientific classification
- Kingdom: Animalia
- Phylum: Mollusca
- Class: Gastropoda
- Order: Stylommatophora
- Family: Pristilomatidae
- Genus: Hawaiia
- Species: H. minuscula

Binomial name
- Hawaiia minuscula (Binney, 1840)

= Hawaiia minuscula =

Species of gastropod

Hawaiia minuscula, common name the minute gem or minute gem snail, is a species of very small air-breathing land snail, a terrestrial pulmonate gastropod mollusk or micromollusk in the family Pristilomatidae.

== Distribution ==
The indigenous distribution of this snail species is: North America.

- Utah (Hawaiia minuscula minuscula and Hawaiia minuscula neomexicana)

The non-indigenous distribution includes:

- Australia
- Czech Republic as a "hothouse alien"
- Great Britain as a "hothouse alien"
