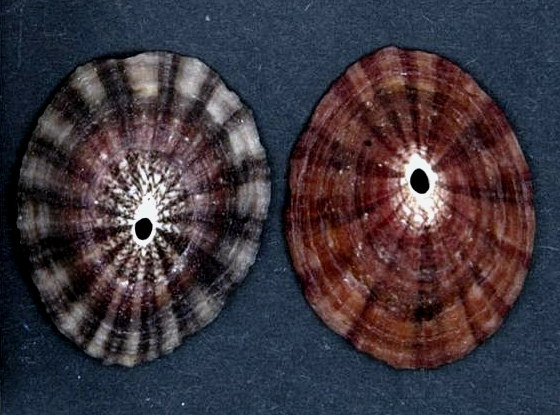
- Shells of Fissurella peruviana (museum specimens at Naturalis Biodiversity Center)

Scientific classification
- Kingdom: Animalia
- Phylum: Mollusca
- Class: Gastropoda
- Subclass: Vetigastropoda
- Order: Lepetellida
- Family: Fissurellidae
- Genus: Fissurella
- Species: F. peruviana

Binomial name
- Fissurella peruviana Lamarck, 1822

Synonyms
- Fissurella affinis Gray in Sowerby I, 1835; Fissurella clypeus Sowerby I, 1835; Fissurella occidens Gould, 1846; Fissurella papudana Ramirez-Boehme, 1974; Fissurella subrotunda Deshayes, 1830

= Fissurella peruviana =

Species of gastropod

Fissurella peruviana, common name : the Peruvian Keyhole Limpet, is a species of sea snail, a marine gastropod mollusk in the family Fissurellidae, the keyhole limpets.

== Description ==
The size of an adult shell varies between 20 mm and 35 mm. The shell structure consists of radial ribs with a foramen at the apex. There is a prominent horseshoe-shaped muscle attachment in the interior.

== Distribution ==
This species occurs in the Pacific Ocean along Peru and Chile generally in the intertidal zone, but occasionally found in the subtidal zone.
