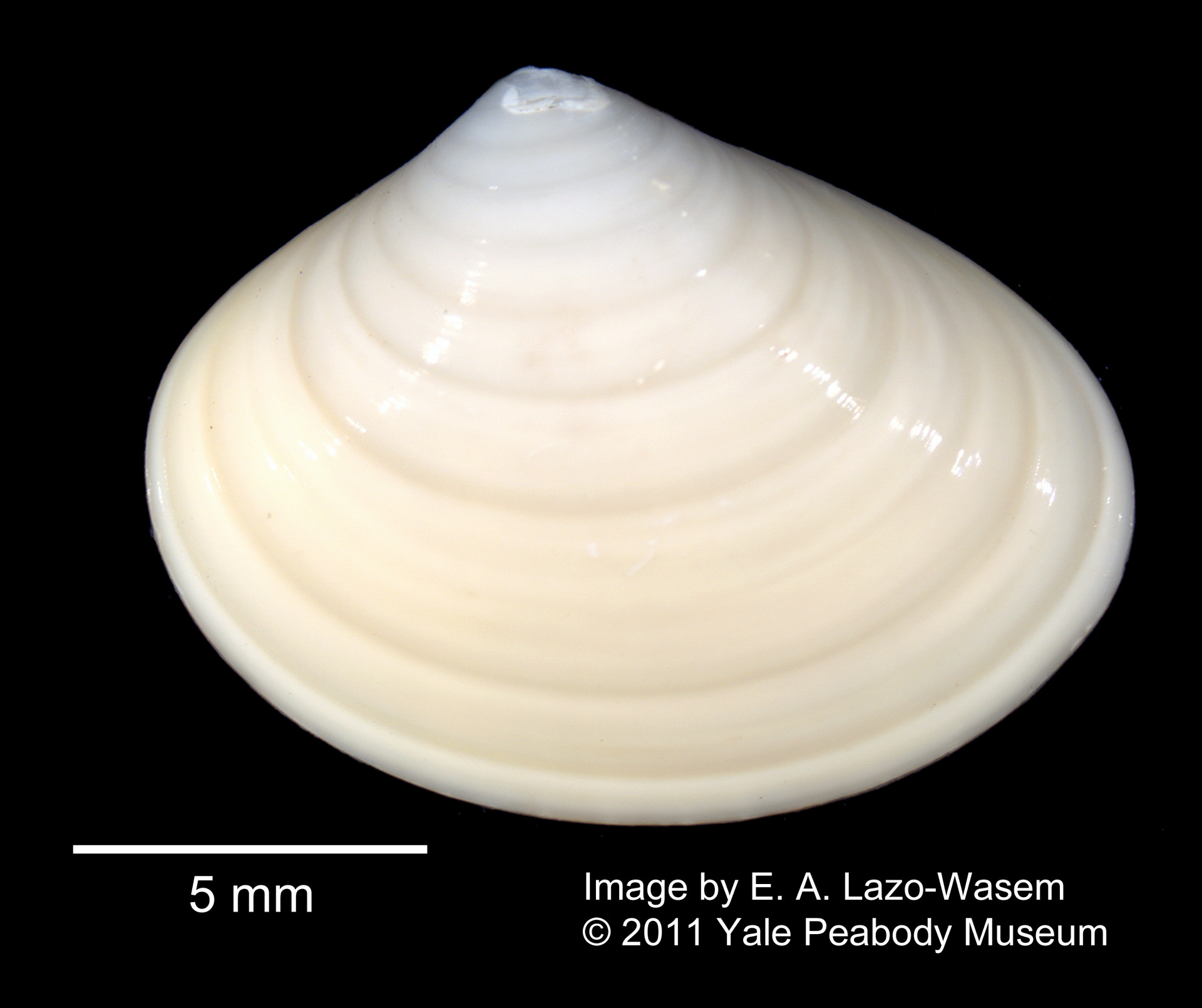

Scientific classification
- Kingdom: Animalia
- Phylum: Mollusca
- Class: Bivalvia
- Order: Venerida
- Superfamily: Veneroidea
- Family: Veneridae
- Genus: Liocyma
- Species: L. fluctuosa

Binomial name
- Liocyma fluctuosa (Gould, 1841)

= Liocyma fluctuosa =

Species of bivalve

Liocyma fluctuosa, or the wavy clam, is a species of bivalve mollusc in the family Veneridae. It can be found along the Atlantic coast of North America, from Greenland to Maine, and along the Pacific coast, from Alaska to British Columbia.
