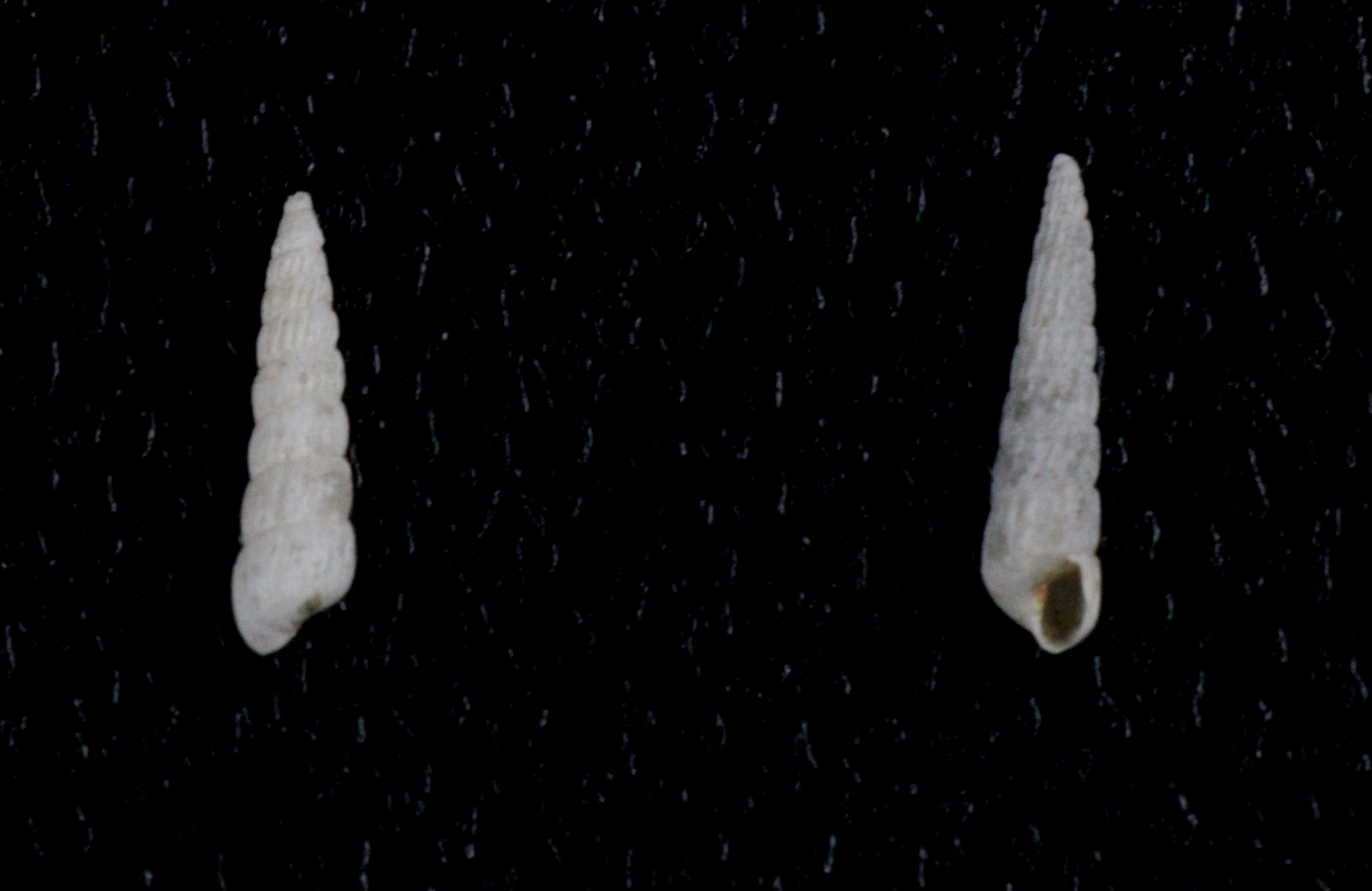

Scientific classification
- Kingdom: Animalia
- Phylum: Mollusca
- Class: Gastropoda
- Family: Pyramidellidae
- Genus: Turbonilla
- Species: T. tenuicula

Binomial name
- Turbonilla tenuicula (Gould, 1853)

Synonyms
- Turbonilla crebrifilata (Carpenter, 1865)

= Turbonilla tenuicula =

Species of gastropod

Turbonilla tenuicula is a species of sea snail, a marine gastropod mollusk in the family Pyramidellidae, the pyrams and their allies.
