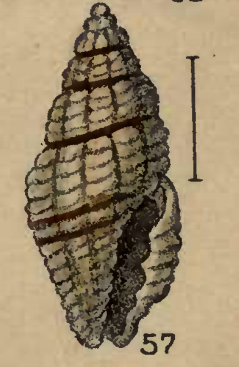
- Drawing of Lienardia mighelsi

Scientific classification
- Kingdom: Animalia
- Phylum: Mollusca
- Class: Gastropoda
- Subclass: Caenogastropoda
- Order: Neogastropoda
- Family: Clathurellidae
- Genus: Lienardia
- Species: L. mighelsi

Binomial name
- Lienardia mighelsi Iredale & Tomlin, 1917

Synonyms
- Clathurella rugosa (Mighels, 1845); Clathurella solidula Dunker, 1871; Glyphostoma rugosum (Mighels, 1845); Lienardia rugosa (Mighels, 1845); Pleurotoma rugosa Mighels, 1845

= Lienardia mighelsi =

Species of gastropod

Lienardia mighelsi is a species of sea snail, a marine gastropod mollusc in the family Clathurellidae.

== Description ==
The outer lip is thickened and bears teeth. The anal sinus is large and rather deep. The color of the shell is whitish, with a chestnut band at the suture, obscurely indicated on the middle of the body whorl. The length of the shell is 6.5 mm.

== Distribution ==
This species occurs in the Pacific Ocean along Madagascar.
