= Hemilienardia minialba =

Scientific classification
- Kingdom: Animalia
- Phylum: Mollusca
- Class: Gastropoda
- Subclass: Caenogastropoda
- Order: Neogastropoda
- Superfamily: Conoidea
- Family: Raphitomidae
- Genus: Hemilienardia
- Species: H. minialba

Binomial name
- Hemilienardia minialba Wiedrick, 2017

Species of gastropod

Hemilienardia minialba is a species of sea snail, a marine gastropod mollusk in the family Raphitomidae.

== Distribution ==
This marine species occurs off Palawan, the Philippines.
