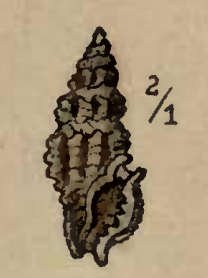
- Drawing of Lienardia rigida

Scientific classification
- Kingdom: Animalia
- Phylum: Mollusca
- Class: Gastropoda
- Subclass: Caenogastropoda
- Order: Neogastropoda
- Family: Clathurellidae
- Genus: Lienardia
- Species: L. rigida

Binomial name
- Lienardia rigida (Hinds, 1843)

Synonyms
- Clathurella affinis Dall, W.H., 1871; Clathurella rigida (Hinds, 1843); Clavatula rigida Hinds, 1843; Mangilia rigida Hinds, 1843

= Lienardia rigida =

Species of gastropod

Lienardia rigida is a species of sea snail, a marine gastropod mollusk in the family Clathurellidae.

== Description ==
The size of an adult shell varies between 6.3 mm and 8 mm. The color of the shell is fulvous. The shoulder undulates at the angle by the longitudinal ribs, which are crossed by raised striae.

== Distribution ==
This species occurs in the Pacific Ocean off Baja California, Panama and the Galapagos Islands.
