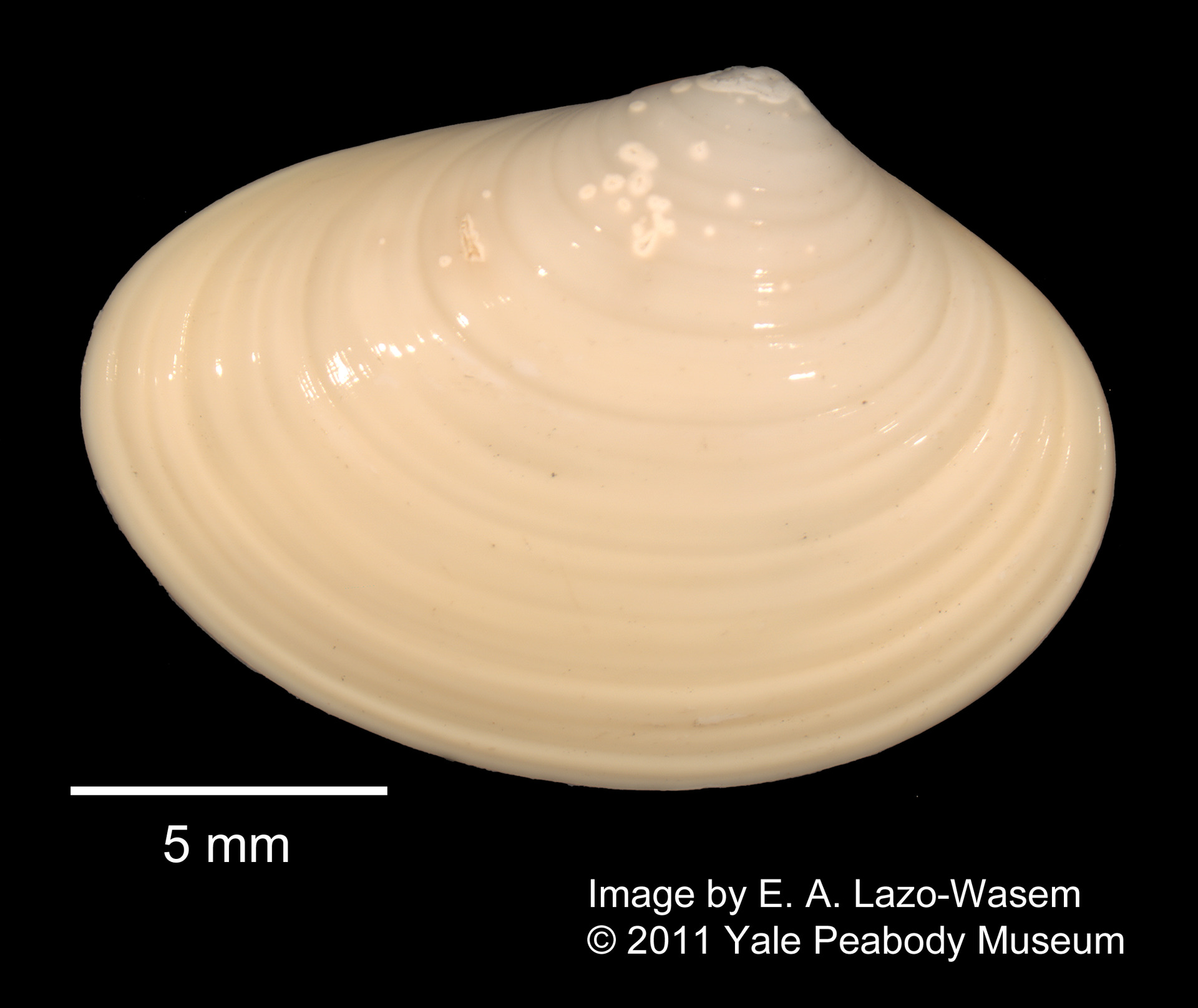
- Liocyma fluctuosa

Scientific classification
- Domain: Eukaryota
- Kingdom: Animalia
- Phylum: Mollusca
- Class: Bivalvia
- Order: Venerida
- Superfamily: Veneroidea
- Family: Veneridae
- Genus: Liocyma; Dall, 1870

Species
- See text.

= Liocyma =

Genus of bivalves

Liocyma is a genus of molluscs in the family Veneridae.

== Species ==
- Liocyma fluctuosa (Gould, 1841) – wavy clam
