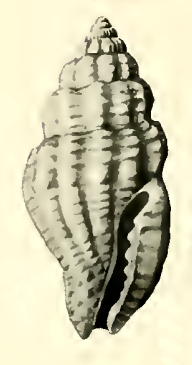
- Original image of a shell of Hemilienardia homochroa

Scientific classification
- Kingdom: Animalia
- Phylum: Mollusca
- Class: Gastropoda
- Subclass: Caenogastropoda
- Order: Neogastropoda
- Superfamily: Conoidea
- Family: Raphitomidae
- Genus: Hemilienardia
- Species: H. homochroa

Binomial name
- Hemilienardia homochroa Hedley, 1922

Synonyms
- Lienardia (Hemilienardia) homochroa (Hedley, 1922)

= Hemilienardia homochroa =

Species of gastropod

Hemilienardia homochroa is a species of sea snail, a marine gastropod mollusk in the family Raphitomidae.

== Description ==
The length of the shell attains 5 mm, its diameter 2.5 mm.

(Original description) The small, solid shell is elongate-ovate. Its colour is entire deep rose pink, except an opaque white zone which is at first one spiral broad and at last three rows broad. The shell contains eight whorls, first three and a half apical, rapidly increasing. Sculpture : The radials are twelve prominent round-backed ribs, ceasing on the base, discontinuous from whorl to whorl, and broader than their interstices. The spirals amount to sixteen on the body whorl, and to four on the penultimate whorl. They are stout close-set cords which traverse both ribs and interstices and continue on the base. There they carry large beads in continuation of the axes of the ribs. The whole surface is also microscopically shagreened. Aperture:—The mouth is vertical, contracted by the limb of the varix, the free edge of which is armed with five prominent tubercles. The columella is excavate and twisted The sinus is deep and narrow.

This is an Australian representative of Hemilienardia malleti (Recluz, 1852) from the tropical Pacific. It is easily and definitely distinguished by having the protoconch coloured like the rest of the shell instead of being a brilliant white like that of malleti.

== Distribution ==
This marine species occurs off Taiwan, the Philippines and Australia (Queensland, New South Wales)
