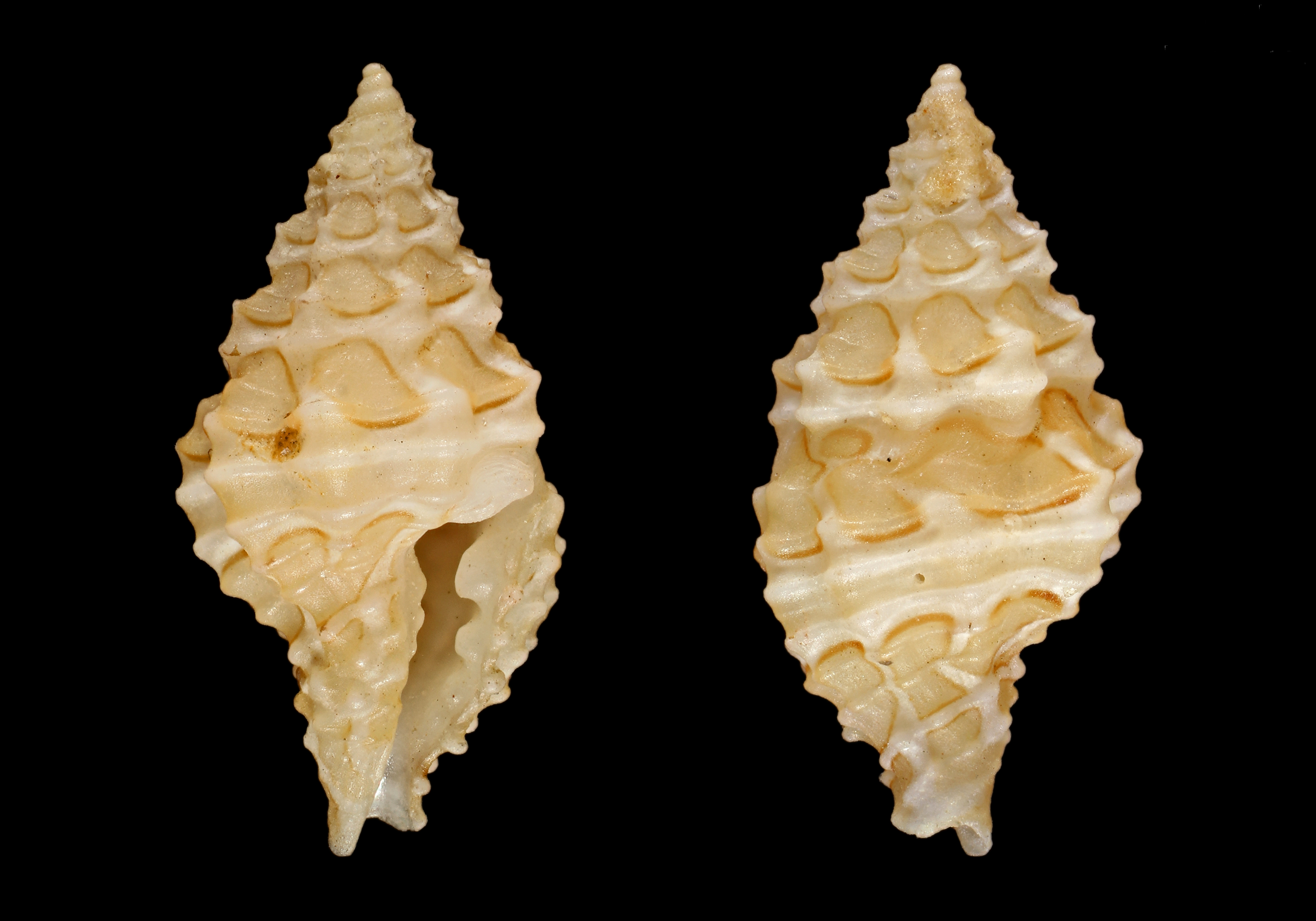
- Original image of a shell of Hemilienardia pardus (holotype in MNHN, Paris)

Scientific classification
- Kingdom: Animalia
- Phylum: Mollusca
- Class: Gastropoda
- Subclass: Caenogastropoda
- Order: Neogastropoda
- Superfamily: Conoidea
- Family: Raphitomidae
- Genus: Hemilienardia
- Species: H. pardus

Binomial name
- Hemilienardia pardus Fedosov, Stahlschmidt, Puillandre, Aznar-Cormano & Bouchet, 2017

= Hemilienardia pardus =

Species of gastropod

Hemilienardia pardus is a species of sea snail, a marine gastropod mollusk in the family Raphitomidae.

== Description ==
Color varies from snail to snail, but red and white is a common color. The shell color becomes less vibrant when not maintained by a live snail. The length of the shell attains 5.8 mm.

== Distribution ==
This marine species occurs off Tahiti, the Society Islands.
