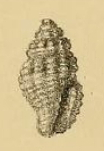
- Original image of a shell of Hemilienardia iospira

Scientific classification
- Kingdom: Animalia
- Phylum: Mollusca
- Class: Gastropoda
- Subclass: Caenogastropoda
- Order: Neogastropoda
- Superfamily: Conoidea
- Family: Raphitomidae
- Genus: Hemilienardia
- Species: H. iospira

Binomial name
- Hemilienardia iospira (Hervier, 1896)

Synonyms
- Clathurella iospira Hervier, 1896 (original combination)

= Hemilienardia iospira =

Species of gastropod

Hemilienardia iospira is a species of sea snail, a marine gastropod mollusk in the family Raphitomidae.

== Description ==
The length of the shell attains 4 mm, its diameter 1.5 mm.

The small, fusiform shell is slightly elongated. The thickened shell is shiny, with a purple lilac coloration on the upper whorls, below the yellow protoconch. On the penultimate whorl and the body whorl, a light white band occupies the middle, becoming more intense on the dorsal part of the body whorl. At this point, the 5th and 6th ribs become discolored and turn white, especially at the opening of the outer lip, where the white coloring broadens and extends more or less. The shell contains 6 whorls. The 1½ embryonic yellow whorls are rounded and smooth. The next whorls are oblate-convex, compressed at the suture and very briefly angular at the top. The shell is reticulate (quite tight in the upper whorls, more expanded at the body whorl) with a granular, high mesh network produced by the intercrossing of vertical rounded, rather strong ribs and 3 strong decurrent cords. The body whorl is convex, slightly depressed toward the base, below the 5th and 6th ribs, which are stronger than the others. The aperture is elongated, narrow, with the same color as the shell. The columella is purplish. The outer edge is oblate-convex in the upper part but substantially swollen on the fifth and sixth ribs, which show a white appearance, and protrudes on the aperture. The aperture is thickened on the last rib, crenelated on the sharp outer lip and furnished inside with 5 denticulate folds. The subsutural sinus cuts rather deep into the thickening of the outer lip, where it expands and becomes rounded.

== Distribution ==
This marine species occurs off Lifou, New Caledonia.
