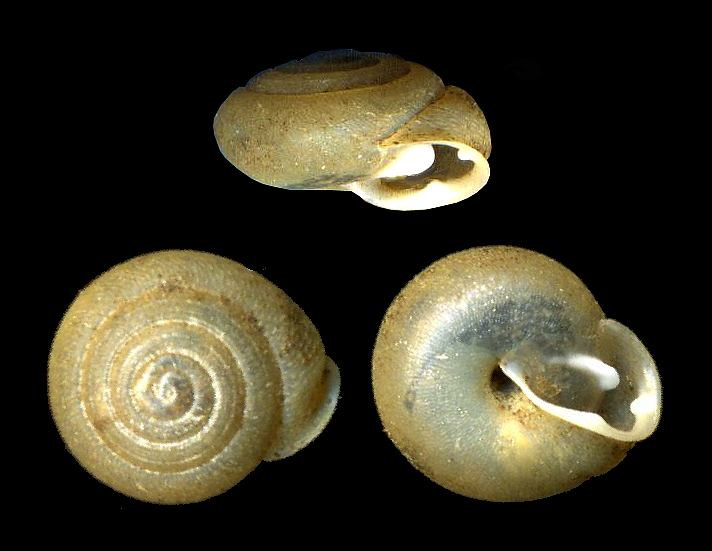
- Three views of a shell of Trilobopsis loricata

Scientific classification
- Kingdom: Animalia
- Phylum: Mollusca
- Class: Gastropoda
- Order: Stylommatophora
- Family: Polygyridae
- Tribe: Allogonini
- Genus: Trilobopsis; Pilsbry, 1939

= Trilobopsis =

Genus of gastropods

Trilobopsis is a genus of small, air-breathing land snails, terrestrial pulmonate gastropod mollusks in the family Polygyridae.

== Distribution ==
The distribution of this species is restricted to Oregon and California, USA.

== Description ==
The shells of species in this genus are somewhat globular and about 5 to 8 mm (1/4 to 3/16 inch) in diameter.

Snails in this genus are distinguished from related snails on the basis of their reproductive anatomy.

== Species ==
Species in the genus Trilobopsis include:

- Trilobopsis loricata (Gould, 1846)
  - Trilobopsis loricata lowei (Pilsbry, 1925)
  - Trilobopsis loricata mariposa Pilsbry, 1940
  - Trilobopsis loricata nortensis (Berry, 1933)
  - Trilobopsis loricata perforata Pilsbry, 1940
  - Trilobopsis loricata sonomaensis (Hemphill, 1911)
- Trilobopsis penitens (Hanna & Rixford, 1923)
- Trilobopsis roperi (Pilsbry, 1889)
- Trilobopsis tehamana (Pilsbry, 1928)
- Trilobopsis trachypepla (Berry, 1933)
