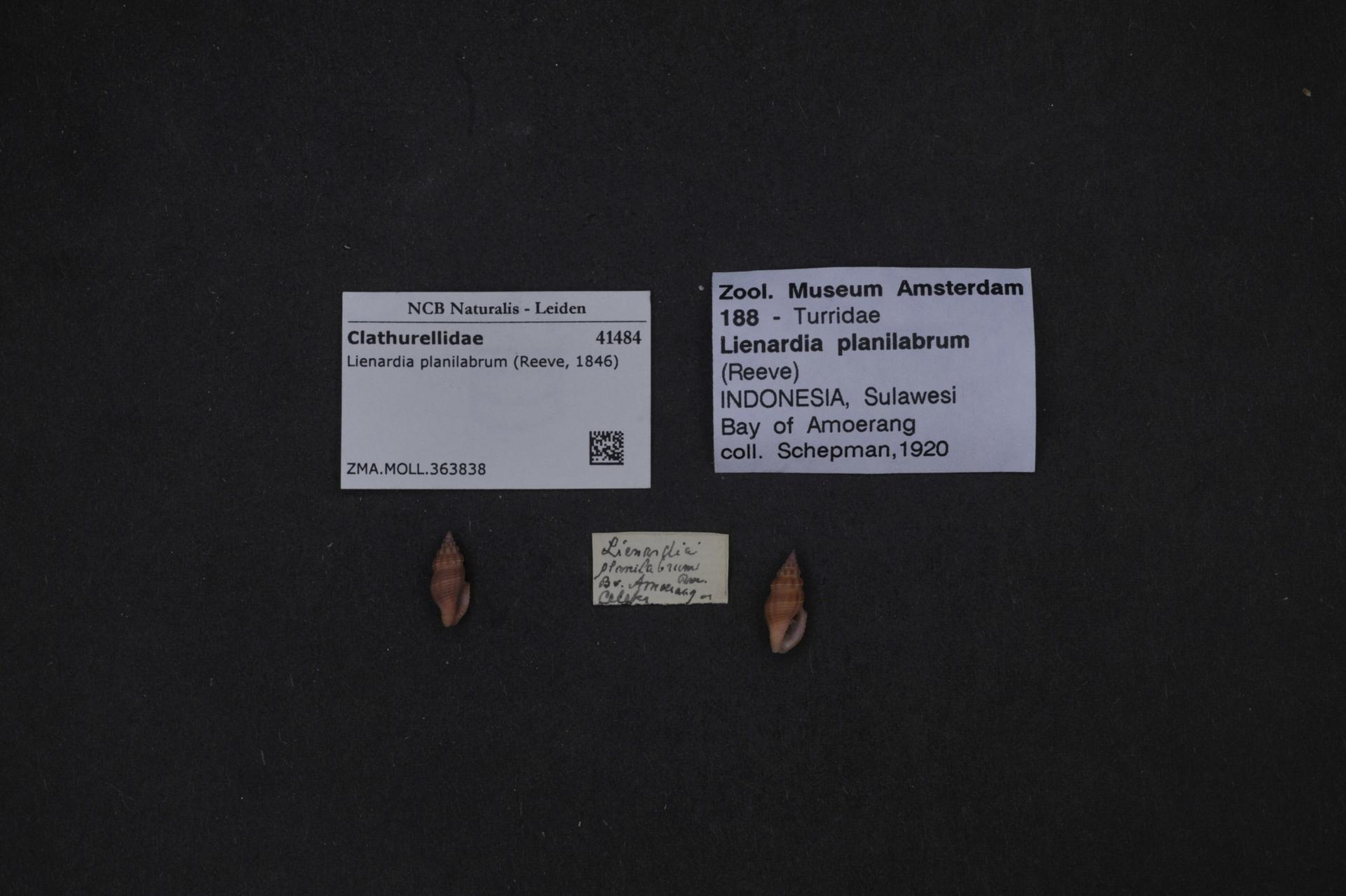

Scientific classification
- Kingdom: Animalia
- Phylum: Mollusca
- Class: Gastropoda
- Subclass: Caenogastropoda
- Order: Neogastropoda
- Family: Clathurellidae
- Genus: Lienardia
- Species: L. planilabrum

Binomial name
- Lienardia planilabrum Reeve, 1845

Synonyms
- Mangelia planilabrum Reeve, 1846

= Lienardia planilabrum =

Species of sea snail

Lienardia planilabrum is a species of sea snail. It is a marine gastropod mollusk in the family Clathurellidae.
