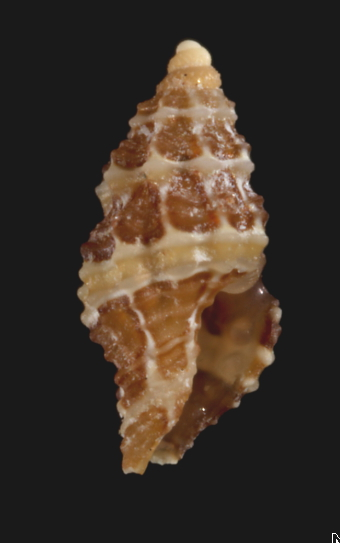
- Shell of Hemilienardia lynx (holotype at MNHN, Paris)

Scientific classification
- Kingdom: Animalia
- Phylum: Mollusca
- Class: Gastropoda
- Subclass: Caenogastropoda
- Order: Neogastropoda
- Superfamily: Conoidea
- Family: Raphitomidae
- Genus: Hemilienardia; O. Boettger, 1895

Type species
- Pleurotoma malleti Recluz, 1852

Species
- See text

Synonyms
- Clathurella (Hemilienardia) O. Boettger, 1895 (original rank); Lienardia (Hemilienardia) Boettger, 1895)

= Hemilienardia =

Genus of gastropods

Hemilienardia is a genus of sea snails, marine gastropod mollusks in the family Raphitomidae, the turrids.

== Description ==
This genus is readily distinguishable from Lienardia by the apex. The multispiral protoconch consists of a cone of 3½ smooth rounded whorls. It lacks the characteristic diagonally cancellated sculpture of the other genera in this family. The succeeding adult whorls not only differ in sculpture, but are wound in so divergent a spiral and increase at so disproportionate rate as to project that protoconch in a mucronate point. In the colour of the type the contrast is even more violent, as there the brilliant snow-white apex against the deep rose-red is visible to the naked eye. Another generic feature is an opaque peripheral zone. The deep-seated columella folds, so conspicuous in Lienardia, are here less developed. The species are small, short, stumpy and usually brightly coloured. They frequent the upper zone of coral reefs.

== Species ==
Species within the genus Hemilienardia include:

- Hemilienardia acinonyx Fedosov, Stahlschmidt, Puillandre, Aznar-Cormano & Bouchet, 2017
- Hemilienardia albomagna Wiedrick, 2017
- Hemilienardia albostrigata (Baird, 1873)
- Hemilienardia apiculata (Montrouzier in Souverbie & Montrouzier, 1864)
- Hemilienardia balteata (Pease, 1860)
- Hemilienardia bicolor Bozzetti, 2018
- Hemilienardia boucheti Wiedrick, 2017
- Hemilienardia calcicincta (Melvill & Standen, 1895)
- Hemilienardia chrysoleuca (J.C. Melvill, 1923)
- Hemilienardia contortula (G. Nevill & H. Nevill, 1875)
- Hemilienardia ecprepes (J.C. Melvill, 1927)
- Hemilienardia elongata Wiedrick, 2017
- Hemilienardia fenestrata (Melvill, 1898)
- Hemilienardia fusiforma Wiedrick, 2017
- Hemilienardia gemmulata Wiedrick, 2017
- Hemilienardia goubini (Hervier, 1896)
- Hemilienardia hersilia Hedley, 1922
- Hemilienardia homochroa Hedley, 1922
- Hemilienardia infulabrunnea Wiedrick, 2017
- Hemilienardia iospira (Hervier, 1896)
- Hemilienardia lynx Fedosov, Stahlschmidt, Puillandre, Aznar-Cormano & Bouchet, 2017
- Hemilienardia malleti (Récluz, 1852)
- Hemilienardia micronesialba Wiedrick, 2017
- Hemilienardia mikesevernsi Wiedrick, 2017
- Hemilienardia minialba Wiedrick, 2017
- Hemilienardia minor (G. Nevill & H. Nevill, 1875)
- Hemilienardia moffitti Wiedrick, 2017
- Hemilienardia multidentata Wiedrick, 2017
- Hemilienardia notopyrrha (Melvill & Standen, 1896)
- Hemilienardia obesa (de Folin, 1879)
- Hemilienardia ocellata (Jousseaume, 1883)
- Hemilienardia pardus Fedosov, Stahlschmidt, Puillandre, Aznar-Cormano & Bouchet, 2017
- Hemilienardia purpurascens (Dunker, 1871)
- Hemilienardia roseorobusta Wiedrick, 2017
- Hemilienardia rubicunda (Gould, 1860)
- Hemilienardia shawnmilleri Wiedrick, 2017
- Hemilienardia subspurca (Hervier, 1896)
- Hemilienardia thyridota (Melvill & Standen, 1896)
- Hemilienardia twilabratcherae Wiedrick, 2017

Species brought into synonymy

- Hemilienardia pinguis (Garrett, A., 1873): synonym of Hemilienardia malleti (Récluz, 1852)
