= Hemilienardia micronesialba =

Scientific classification
- Kingdom: Animalia
- Phylum: Mollusca
- Class: Gastropoda
- Subclass: Caenogastropoda
- Order: Neogastropoda
- Superfamily: Conoidea
- Family: Raphitomidae
- Genus: Hemilienardia
- Species: H. micronesialba

Binomial name
- Hemilienardia micronesialba Wiedrick, 2017

Species of gastropod

Hemilienardia micronesialba is a species of sea snail, a marine gastropod mollusk in the family Raphitomidae.

== Distribution ==
This marine species occurs off the Philippines.
