= 1827 Boston mayoral election =

Election in Massachusetts, United States

- December 10, 1827
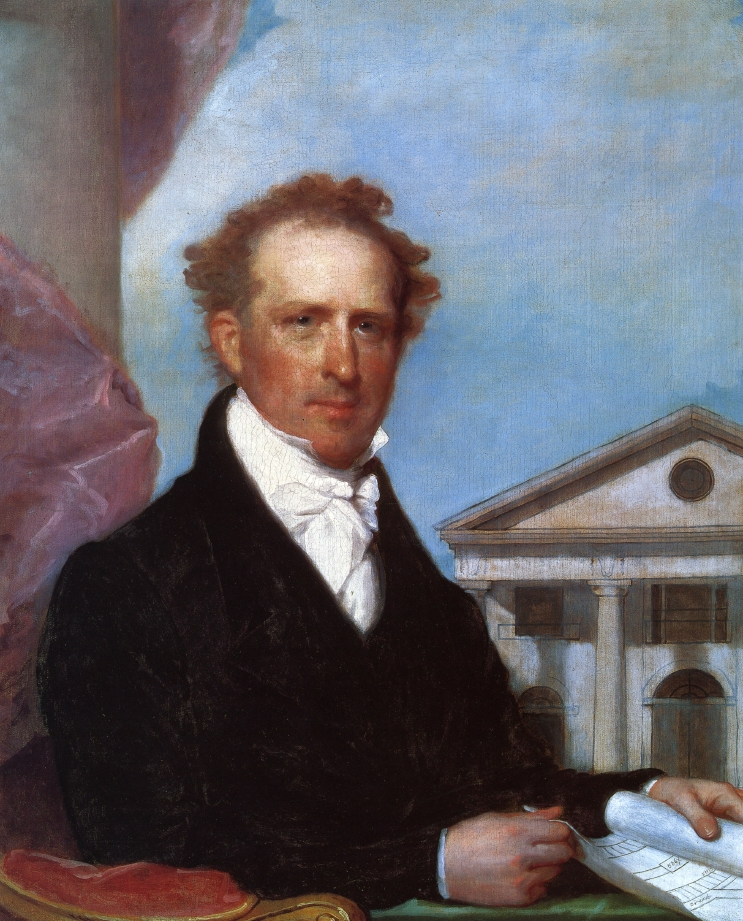

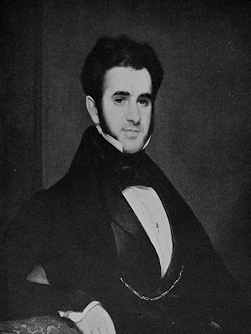
Candidate	Josiah Quincy III	Amos Binney
Popular vote	2,189	340
Percentage	83.26%	12.93%
Mayor before election
Josiah Quincy III
Federalist
Elected mayor
Josiah Quincy III
Federalist

The 1827 Boston mayoral election saw the reelection of incumbent Josiah Quincy III to a sixth consecutive term. It was held on December 10, 1827.

== Results ==
1827 Boston mayoral election
Candidate	Votes	%
Josiah Quincy III (incumbent)	2,189	83.26
Amos Binney	340	12.93
Scattering	100	3.80
Total votes	2,629	100

== See also ==
- List of mayors of Boston, Massachusetts
