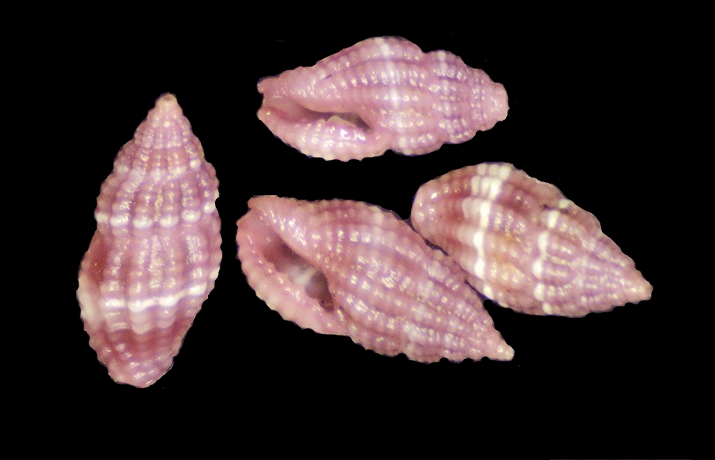
- Shells of Hemilienardia rubicunda

Scientific classification
- Kingdom: Animalia
- Phylum: Mollusca
- Class: Gastropoda
- Subclass: Caenogastropoda
- Order: Neogastropoda
- Superfamily: Conoidea
- Family: Raphitomidae
- Genus: Hemilienardia
- Species: H. rubicunda

Binomial name
- Hemilienardia rubicunda (Gould, 1860)

Synonyms
- Clathurella rubicunda Gould, 1860 (original combination); Lienardia rubicunda (Gould, 1860)

= Hemilienardia rubicunda =

Species of gastropod

Hemilienardia rubicunda is a species of sea snail, a marine gastropod mollusk in the family Raphitomidae.

== Description ==
The length of the shell attains 5 mm, its diameter 2 mm.

(Original description in Latin) The shell is small, thick, and ovately turreted. It is pale rose-coloured and ornamented with paler threads, which are separated by darker lines, together with a lighter subsutural band. The shell comprises six inflated whorls that increase rapidly in size and are latticed by ten undulations crossed by transverse threads; the penultimate whorl bears six such threads. The aperture is short and narrow. The outer lip is thickened and bears denticles internally. The sinus is narrow and deep, the columella is flexuous, and the siphonal canal is short.

== Distribution ==
This marine species occurs off the Philippines and in the Red Sea and the Central and West Pacific.
