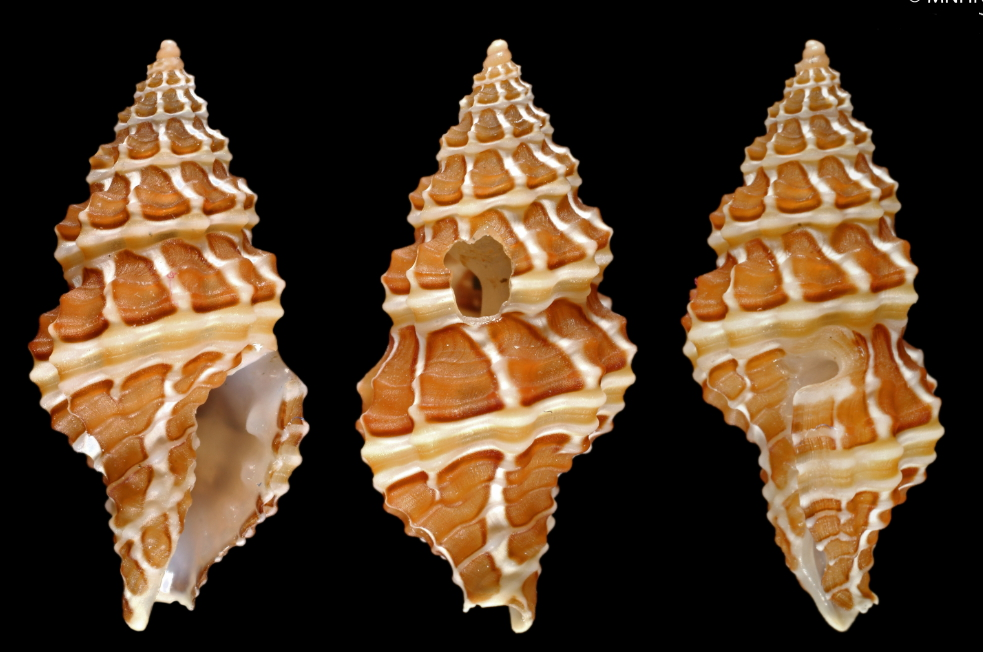
- Original image of a shell of Hemilienardia acinonyx

Scientific classification
- Kingdom: Animalia
- Phylum: Mollusca
- Class: Gastropoda
- Subclass: Caenogastropoda
- Order: Neogastropoda
- Superfamily: Conoidea
- Family: Raphitomidae
- Genus: Hemilienardia
- Species: H. acinonyx

Binomial name
- Hemilienardia acinonyx Fedosov, Stahlschmidt, Puillandre, Aznar-Cormano & Bouchet, 2017

= Hemilienardia acinonyx =

Species of gastropod

Hemilienardia acinonyx is a species of sea snail, a marine gastropod mollusk in the family Raphitomidae.

== Description ==
The length of the shell varies between 3.1 mm to 8.1 mm. The holotype specimen has dimensions of 8.1x3.8mm.

The shell is small, broadly fusiform to biconical, with rather long and slightly recurved siphonal canal. Spire orthoconoid, teleoconch of 3.5-5 whorls. Suture incised, undulating. Adapical portion of teleoconch whorls forming wide concave depression, basal portion strongly convex, with periphery shifted towards lower suture. Sculpture of very strong, widely interspaced axial ribs (9–10 on last whorl), vanishing on adapical areas of whorls. Axial ribs overridden by rounded spiral cords, slightly thickened where intersecting axials. Interspaces shallow. Microsculpture of dense tubercles covering entire teleoconch surface and fine arcuate growth lines in adapical depression. Spire whorls sculptured with three spiral cords, adapical one weaker, than two succeeding; second spiral cord strongly elevated, giving spire whorls indistinctly shouldered appearance. Last adult whorl with 6 major spiral cords, and distinct thread situated in interspace between third and fourth major cords. Siphonal canal long, recurved abaxially, deeply notched at its tip, sculptured with oblique rows of tubercles. Aperture elongate, slightly contorted. Outer apertural lip with moderately developed varix, its inside with four denticles, of which the adapicalmost is strongest. Inner lip contorted below its mid-height, with oblique cords sculpturing fasciole, continuing inside aperture. Anal sinus rounded, deep and rather narrow, slightly constricted by subsutural callous tubercle.

Hemilienardia acinonyx has a protoconch which is white, narrowly conical, of 2.3 evenly convex whorls. PI whorls with sharp spiral cords on its abapical portion, intersected by short axial strokes to form elevated, cross-shaped tubercles. PII sculptured with subsutural row of fine, evenly spaced, axial riblets and bearing somewhat “crumpled” diagonally cancellate sculpture on periphery.

Colour: background colour white with yellow line in interspace between third and fourth spiral cords, and regular triangular or squarish olive blotches encircled by darker line, situated above third spiral cord in interspaces between axial folds. Similar blotches covering shell base and siphonal canal.

The radula is very small, consisting of less than 10 rows of marginal teeth that are triangular, flat, with slightly thickened margins. Tooth width about 24 μm, length about 35 μm (about 1.5% of aperture height).

Hemilienardia acinonyx sp. nov. can be distinguished from other eye-spotted species of Hemilienardia by its orthoconoid spire with rather small protoconch, and the presence of the diagnostic spiral thread in the interspace between the third and fourth spiral cords. The ocellae decorating shell of H. acinonyx sp. nov. are usually triangular or squarish, which easily tells it apart from the more common H. ocellata. Specimens of H. acinonyx sp. nov. from the type locality notably exceed other ocellated species of Hemilienardia in size, as they may reach a height of 10–12 mm. Besides, the radula teeth in studied specimens of H. acinonyx sp. nov. are about three times shorter compared to the marginals of H. ocellata, and are flattened, broadly triangular in shape.

== Distribution ==
This marine species has been found to occur off Panglao Island and Balicasag Island in the Philippines; Baudisson Island in Papua New Guinea; the Loyalty Islands and Poindimié in New Caledonia; and off the south-east coast of Fiji. Hemilienardia acinonyx has been found living at depths of 20-70m.
