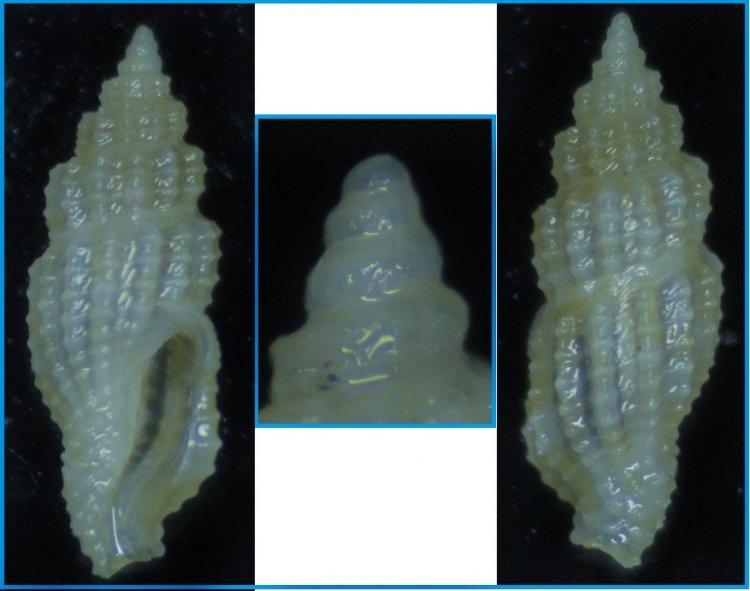
- Shells of Hemilienardia subspurca

Scientific classification
- Kingdom: Animalia
- Phylum: Mollusca
- Class: Gastropoda
- Subclass: Caenogastropoda
- Order: Neogastropoda
- Superfamily: Conoidea
- Family: Raphitomidae
- Genus: Hemilienardia
- Species: H. subspurca

Binomial name
- Hemilienardia subspurca (Hervier, 1896)

Synonyms
- Glyphostoma subspurcum Hervier, 1896 (original combination); Kermia subspurca (Hervier, 1896)

= Hemilienardia subspurca =

Species of gastropod

Hemilienardia subspurca is a species of sea snail, a marine gastropod mollusk in the family Raphitomidae.

== Description ==
The length of the shell varies between 5 mm and 9 mm.

== Distribution ==
This marine species occurs off the Loyalty Islands, New Caledonia and Taiwan.
