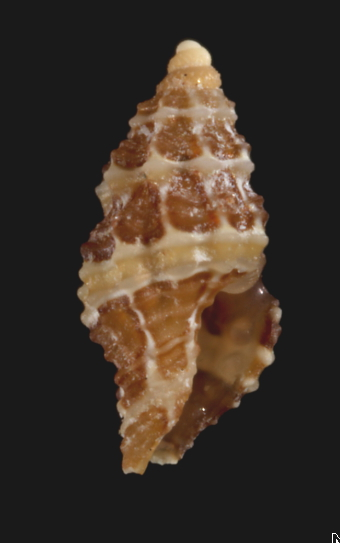
- Original image of a shell of Hemilienardia lynx (holotype in MNHN, Paris)

Scientific classification
- Kingdom: Animalia
- Phylum: Mollusca
- Class: Gastropoda
- Subclass: Caenogastropoda
- Order: Neogastropoda
- Superfamily: Conoidea
- Family: Raphitomidae
- Genus: Hemilienardia
- Species: H. lynx

Binomial name
- Hemilienardia lynx Fedosov, Stahlschmidt, Puillandre, Aznar-Cormano & Bouchet, 2017

= Hemilienardia lynx =

Species of sea snail

Hemilienardia lynx is a species of sea snail, a marine gastropod mollusk in the family Raphitomidae.

== Description ==
The Hemilienardia lynx shell is tiny, about 2.75 mm long and 1.35 mm wide, with an oval shape and a pointed tip. It has around 3.2 whorls, featuring strong ribs crossed by low spiral lines. The shell is mostly white with dark olive spots and a yellow line on the last whorl. Its opening is narrow with four small teeth, and the early shell development is conical, starting white and turning light brown with fine patterns.

== Distribution ==
This marine species can be found off Papua New Guinea
