= Hemilienardia obesa =

Scientific classification
- Kingdom: Animalia
- Phylum: Mollusca
- Class: Gastropoda
- Subclass: Caenogastropoda
- Order: Neogastropoda
- Superfamily: Conoidea
- Family: Raphitomidae
- Genus: Hemilienardia
- Species: H. obesa

Binomial name
- Hemilienardia obesa (de Folin, 1879)

Synonyms
- Pleurotoma obesa de Folin, 1879 (original combination)

Species of sea snail

Hemilienardia obesa is a species of sea snail, a marine gastropod mollusk in the family Raphitomidae.

== Distribution ==
This marine species occurs off the Andaman Islands.
