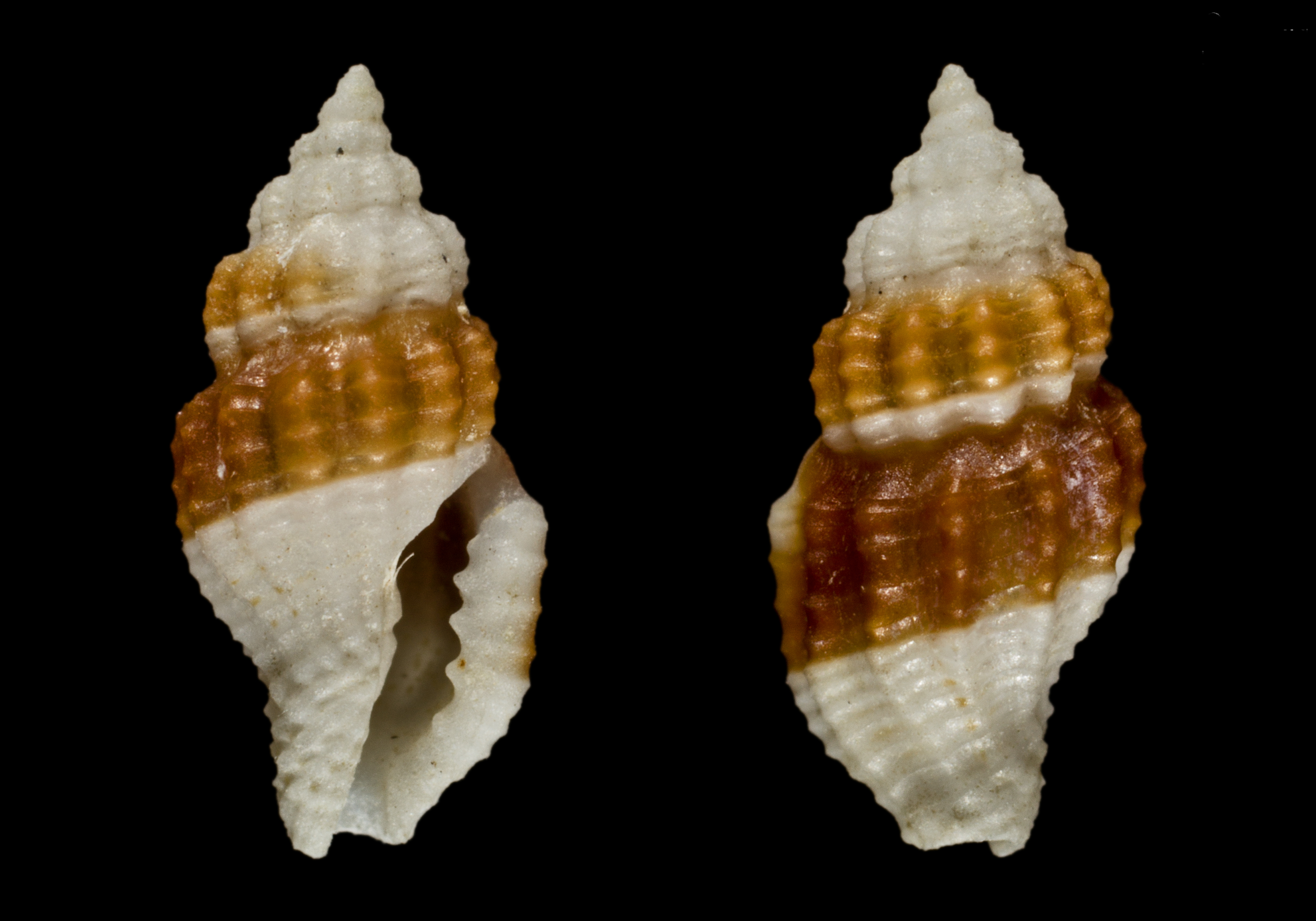
- Original image of a shell of Hemilienardia bicolor (holotype at MNHN, Paris)

Scientific classification
- Kingdom: Animalia
- Phylum: Mollusca
- Class: Gastropoda
- Subclass: Caenogastropoda
- Order: Neogastropoda
- Superfamily: Conoidea
- Family: Raphitomidae
- Genus: Hemilienardia
- Species: H. bicolor

Binomial name
- Hemilienardia bicolor Bozzetti, 2018

= Hemilienardia bicolor =

Species of gastropod

Hemilienardia bicolor is a species of sea snail, a marine gastropod mollusk in the family Raphitomidae.

== Description ==
The length of the shell attains 5.2 mm.

== Distribution ==
This marine species is endemic to Davao, Mindanao, the Philippines.
