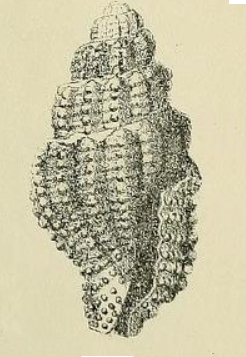
- Original image of a shell of Hemilienardia contortula

Scientific classification
- Kingdom: Animalia
- Phylum: Mollusca
- Class: Gastropoda
- Subclass: Caenogastropoda
- Order: Neogastropoda
- Superfamily: Conoidea
- Family: Raphitomidae
- Genus: Hemilienardia
- Species: H. contortula

Binomial name
- Hemilienardia contortula (G. Nevill & H. Nevill, 1875)

Synonyms
- Clathurella contortula G. Nevill & H. Nevill, 1875 (original combination)

= Hemilienardia contortula =

Species of gastropod

Hemilienardia contortula is a species of sea snail, a marine gastropod mollusk in the family Raphitomidae.

== Description ==
The length of the shell attains 5½ mm, its diameter 2½ mm.

(Original description) The shell is globosely conical, somewhat peculiarly twisted or bent, with a distinct suture. It is white, with a pink tinge towards the top. The apex is very obtuse, with a decollated appearance. The shell contains 6 whorls. They are longitudinally ribbed, with the ribs thick and prominent, distantly transversely striated, so as to present a granulose appearance. At the base of the body whorl occur several rows of small granules. The columella is peculiarly twisted. The aperture is narrowly contracted. The outer lip is thick, in the middle bent inwards.

== Distribution ==
This marine species occurs off Sri Lanka.
