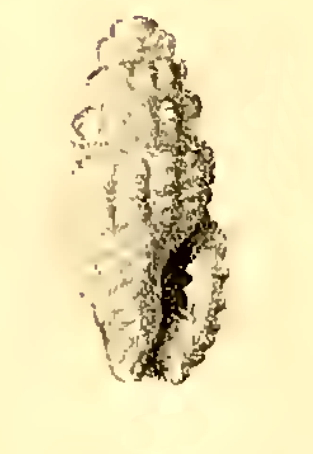
- Original image of a shell of Hemilienardia notopyrrha

Scientific classification
- Kingdom: Animalia
- Phylum: Mollusca
- Class: Gastropoda
- Subclass: Caenogastropoda
- Order: Neogastropoda
- Superfamily: Conoidea
- Family: Raphitomidae
- Genus: Hemilienardia
- Species: H. notopyrrha

Binomial name
- Hemilienardia notopyrrha (Melvill & Standen, 1896)

Synonyms
- Mangilia (Glyphostoma) notopyrrha Melvill & Standen, 1896 (original combination)

= Hemilienardia notopyrrha =

Species of gastropod

Hemilienardia notopyrrha is a species of sea snail, a marine gastropod mollusk in the family Raphitomidae.

== Description ==
The length of the shell attains 5 mm, its diameter 2 mm.

(Original description) This is a pure-white turreted little species, with a conspicuous dorsal squarrose brown spot just below the suture of the body whorl. The shell contains seven whorls. The whorls are ventricose and ribbed longitudinally, crossed with a few conspicuous lirae. The aperture is narrow. The outer lip is much thickened with large denticles on the inner surface, and the columella is toothed.

== Distribution ==
This marine species occurs off the Loyalty Islands and Mactan Island, the Philippines
