= Hemilienardia shawnmilleri =

Scientific classification
- Kingdom: Animalia
- Phylum: Mollusca
- Class: Gastropoda
- Subclass: Caenogastropoda
- Order: Neogastropoda
- Superfamily: Conoidea
- Family: Raphitomidae
- Genus: Hemilienardia
- Species: H. shawnmilleri

Binomial name
- Hemilienardia shawnmilleri Wiedrick, 2017

Species of gastropod

Hemilienardia shawnmilleri is a species of sea snail, a marine gastropod mollusk in the family Raphitomidae.

== Distribution ==
This marine species occurs off Okinawa Island.
