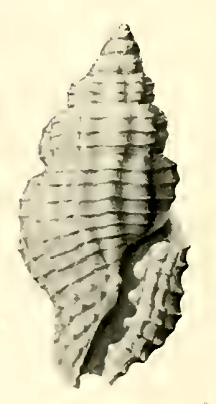
- Original image of a shell of Hemilienardia hersilia

Scientific classification
- Kingdom: Animalia
- Phylum: Mollusca
- Class: Gastropoda
- Subclass: Caenogastropoda
- Order: Neogastropoda
- Superfamily: Conoidea
- Family: Raphitomidae
- Genus: Hemilienardia
- Species: H. hersilia

Binomial name
- Hemilienardia hersilia Hedley, 1922

Synonyms
- Lienardia (Hemilienardia) hersilia (Hedley, 1922)

= Hemilienardia hersilia =

Species of gastropod

Hemilienardia hersilia is a species of sea snail, a marine gastropod mollusk in the family Raphitomidae.

== Description ==
The length of the shell attains 3.5 mm, its diameter 1.7 mm.

(Original description) The small shell is ovate-pointed and contacted at the sutures and at the base. Its colour is dull-white, with an opaque white band at the back of the body whorl. The shell contains 7 whorls, of which three are apical. Sculpture:—The radials are discontinuous, vertical, moderately prominent ribs, which diminish at the sutures and vanish on the base, and are set at ten to a whorl. The spirals are prominent cords which override the ribs, four on the penultimate whorl and twelve on the body whorl. Of these the anterior five run across the snout and are beaded. The Apertureis sinuate. The varix is composed of a double rib, the free limb traversed by eight spirals and the edge armed by four tubercles, becoming larger as they ascend, the lowest double. The columella shows two deep-seated plications. The sinus and the siphonal canal are broad and shallow.

== Distribution ==
This marine species is endemic to Australia and occurs off Queensland. It has also been found in the Western Indian Ocean.
