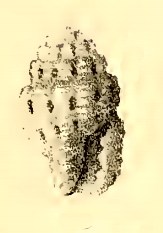
- Original image of a shell of Hemilienardia thyridota

Scientific classification
- Kingdom: Animalia
- Phylum: Mollusca
- Class: Gastropoda
- Subclass: Caenogastropoda
- Order: Neogastropoda
- Superfamily: Conoidea
- Family: Raphitomidae
- Genus: Hemilienardia
- Species: H. thyridota

Binomial name
- Hemilienardia thyridota (Melvill & Standen, 1896)

Synonyms
- Glyphostoma thyridota (Melvill & Standen, 1896).; Lienardia thyridota (Melvill & Standen, 1896); Mangilia (Glyphostoma) thyridota Melvill & Standen, 1896 (original combination)

= Hemilienardia thyridota =

Species of gastropod

Hemilienardia thyridota is a species of sea snail, a marine gastropod mollusk in the family Raphitomidae.

== Description ==
The length of the shell attains 4.5 mm, its diameter 2 mm.

(Original description) This is a pure white, curtly pyramidal species, the surface not shining. It contains six turreted whorls, angled at the suture, ventricose, longitudinally thickly ribbed, transversely ornamented with few lirations. In the middle of the upper whorl and doubly-ranked in the body whorl, are transverse regular deep pittings, squarrose, profound, between the ribs, which suggest the trivial name (from Ancient Greek : thyridotos : furnished with windows or doors). The aperture is narrowly oblique. The outer lip is thickened and furnished with four strong denticles. The columellar teeth are more obscure and feeble. The sinus goes deep into the outer lip.

== Distribution ==
This marine species occurs off the Loyalty Islands, Mactan Island, the Philippines and off Gulf of Carpentaria to Queensland, Australia
