= Hemilienardia ecprepes =

Scientific classification
- Kingdom: Animalia
- Phylum: Mollusca
- Class: Gastropoda
- Subclass: Caenogastropoda
- Order: Neogastropoda
- Superfamily: Conoidea
- Family: Raphitomidae
- Genus: Hemilienardia
- Species: H. ecprepes

Binomial name
- Hemilienardia ecprepes (Melvill, 1927)

Synonyms
- Lienardia ecprepes Melvill, 1927 (original combination)

Species of gastropod

Hemilienardia ecprepes is a species of sea snail, a marine gastropod mollusk in the family Raphitomidae.

== Description ==
The length of the shell attains 6 mm.

== Distribution ==
This species occurs in the Indian Ocean off Réunion.
