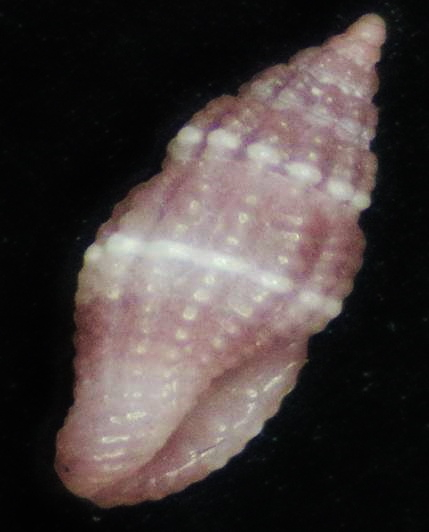
- shell of Hemilienardia goubini

Scientific classification
- Kingdom: Animalia
- Phylum: Mollusca
- Class: Gastropoda
- Subclass: Caenogastropoda
- Order: Neogastropoda
- Superfamily: Conoidea
- Family: Raphitomidae
- Genus: Hemilienardia
- Species: H. goubini

Binomial name
- Hemilienardia goubini (Hervier, 1896)

Synonyms
- Glyphostoma goubini Hervier, 1896 (original combination); Lienardia (Hemilienardia) goubini (Hervier, 1896); Mangilia (Glyphostoma) goubini Melvill and Standen, 1897

= Hemilienardia goubini =

Species of gastropod

Hemilienardia goubini is a species of sea snail, a marine gastropod mollusk in the family Raphitomidae.

== Description ==
The length of the shell varies between 3.5 mm and 5 mm.

This is a very small species, light violet with a white transverse band around the body whorl. The shell contains 7-8 whorls, with two smooth, acuminate ones in the protoconch. The whorls are rotund and longitudinally crassicostate. The numerous lirae are tenuous. The violet aperture is irregularly sinuate. The outer lip is incrassate and shows four teeth on the inside region. The sinus is below the suture. The sinus is wide open and moderately deep.

== Distribution ==
This marine species occurs off the Philippines, Loyalty Islands, Papua New Guinea and Queensland, Australia.
