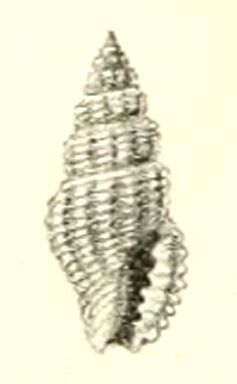
- Drawing of a shell of Hemilienardia fenestrata (holotype)

Scientific classification
- Kingdom: Animalia
- Phylum: Mollusca
- Class: Gastropoda
- Subclass: Caenogastropoda
- Order: Neogastropoda
- Superfamily: Conoidea
- Family: Raphitomidae
- Genus: Hemilienardia
- Species: H. fenestrata

Binomial name
- Hemilienardia fenestrata (Melvill, 1898)

Synonyms
- Hemilienardia boyeri Horro, Gori, Rosado & Rolán, 2021 junior subjective synonym; Lienardia fenestrata Melvill, 1898; Mangilia fenestrata Melvill, 1898 (original combination); Mangilia (Glyphostoma) fenestrata Melvill, 1898 superseded combination

= Hemilienardia fenestrata =

Species of gastropod

Hemilienardia fenestrata is a species of sea snail, a marine gastropod mollusk in the family Raphitomidae.

== Description ==
The length of the shell attains 6 mm, its diameter 2 mm.

(Original description in Latin) The shell is fusiform (spindle-shaped), rather thick, rugose (rough), and generally whitish.

The shell comprises nine whorls. The protoconch is milky white, vitreous (glassy), and smooth. The remaining whorls are slightly swollen showing regular longitudinal ribs (axial sculpture) and rough spiral ridges (lirae).

The resulting interstices (spaces between the ribs and lirae) are often deep and hollow, particularly noticeable on the last three whorls.

The body whorl is slightly produced at the base. Dorsally, near the periphery, it is encircled by an obscure, calcareous band that is interrupted. The aperture is narrow. The outer lip is thickened and denticulate internally. The sinus is conspicuous and broad. The inner lip is marked with two small teeth (bidenticulate) toward the base.

== Distribution ==
This marine species occurs off Aden; also off Hawaii, USA.
