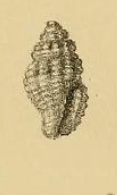
- Original image of a shell of Hemilienardia calcicincta

Scientific classification
- Kingdom: Animalia
- Phylum: Mollusca
- Class: Gastropoda
- Subclass: Caenogastropoda
- Order: Neogastropoda
- Superfamily: Conoidea
- Family: Raphitomidae
- Genus: Hemilienardia
- Species: H. calcicincta

Binomial name
- Hemilienardia calcicincta (Melvill & Standen, 1895)

Synonyms
- Lienardia calcicincta (Melvill & Standen, 1895); Glyphostoma calcicinctum Bouge and Dautzenberg, 1913; Mangilia (Glyphostoma) calcicincta Melvill & Standen, 1895 (original combination)

= Hemilienardia calcicincta =

Species of gastropod

Hemilienardia calcicincta is a species of sea snail, a marine gastropod mollusk in the family Raphitomidae.

== Description ==
The length of the shell attains 4 mm, its diameter 2.25 mm.

(Original description) The small shell is incrassate and rugose. It contains six whorls. It is a little bright white semi-opaque. This opacity being caused by a dead-white transverse band crossing the few, coarse, prominent ribs and becoming broader in the body whorl. The aperture is narrow. The outer lip, under a lens, is very beautiful, being minutely warted, and with four denticles, the columellar margin with four plaits.

== Distribution ==
This marine species is endemic to Australia and occurs from the Gulf of Carpentaria to Queensland
