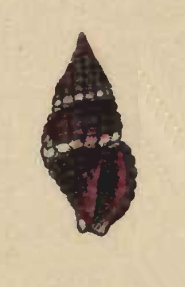
- Original image of Hemilienardia purpurascens

Scientific classification
- Kingdom: Animalia
- Phylum: Mollusca
- Class: Gastropoda
- Subclass: Caenogastropoda
- Order: Neogastropoda
- Superfamily: Conoidea
- Family: Raphitomidae
- Genus: Hemilienardia
- Species: H. purpurascens

Binomial name
- Hemilienardia purpurascens (Dunker, 1871)

Synonyms
- Clathurella pulchella Garrett, 1873 (invalid: junior homonym of Clathurella pulchella Pease, 1860); Clathurella purpurascens Dunker, 1871 (original combination); Glyphostoma purpurascens (Dunker, 1871); Lienardia purpurascens (Dunker, 1871)

= Hemilienardia purpurascens =

Species of gastropod

Hemilienardia purpurascens is a species of sea snail, a marine gastropod mollusk in the family Raphitomidae.

== Description ==
The length of the shell attains 5 mm.

The shell is rose-red to violaceous, with a central white band. The outer lip is 5–6 toothed within.

== Distribution ==
This marine species occurs off Samoa.
