= Hemilienardia balteata =

Scientific classification
- Kingdom: Animalia
- Phylum: Mollusca
- Class: Gastropoda
- Subclass: Caenogastropoda
- Order: Neogastropoda
- Superfamily: Conoidea
- Family: Raphitomidae
- Genus: Hemilienardia
- Species: H. balteata

Binomial name
- Hemilienardia balteata (Pease, 1860)

Synonyms
- Clathurella balteata Pease, 1860 (original combination); Lienardia balteata (Pease, 1860)

Species of gastropod

Hemilienardia balteata is a species of sea snail, a marine gastropod mollusk in the family Raphitomidae.

== Description ==
(Original description) The shell is fusiformly ovate and longitudinally coarsely ribbed. The ribs are disposed alternately on the whorls, crossed by transverse raised striae. The whorls are roundly angulated at the sutures. The outer lip is incurved, serrated on its edge by the termination of the transverse striae. The colour is light brown, ornamented by one white band on centre of each whorl.

== Distribution ==
This marine species is endemic to Hawaii
