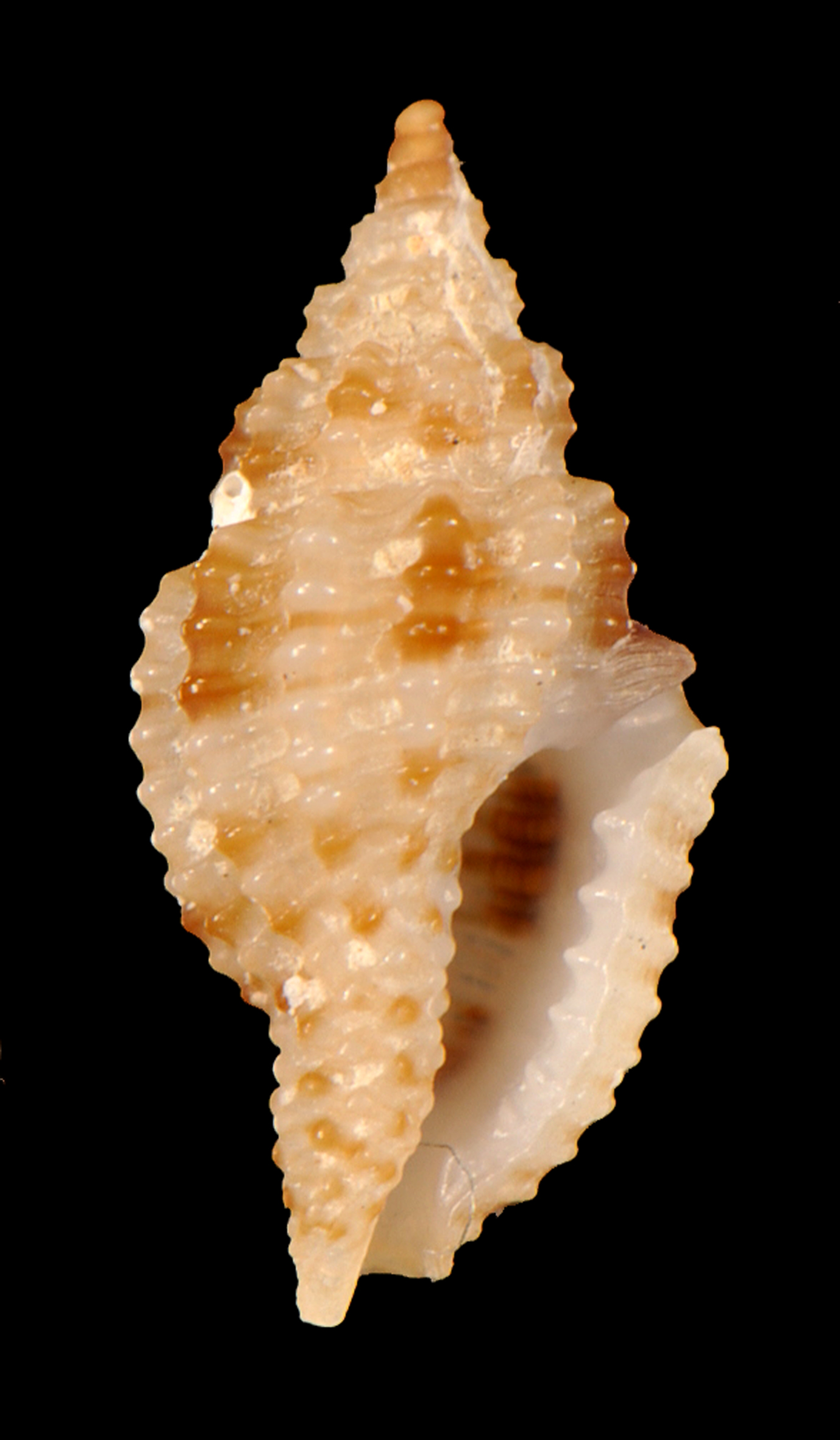
- Shell of Hemilienardia chrysoleuca (specimen at MNHN, Paris)

Scientific classification
- Kingdom: Animalia
- Phylum: Mollusca
- Class: Gastropoda
- Subclass: Caenogastropoda
- Order: Neogastropoda
- Superfamily: Conoidea
- Family: Raphitomidae
- Genus: Hemilienardia
- Species: H. chrysoleuca

Binomial name
- Hemilienardia chrysoleuca (J.C. Melvill, 1923)

Synonyms
- Daphnella chrysoleuca (Melvill, 1923); Glyphostoma permiscere Nowell-Usticke, 1969; Lienardia chrysoleuca Melvill, 1923 (original combination); Truncadaphne permiscere (Nowell-Usticke, 1969)

= Hemilienardia chrysoleuca =

Species of gastropod

Hemilienardia chrysoleuca is a species of sea snail, a marine gastropod mollusk in the family Raphitomidae.

== Description ==
The length of the shell attains 6 mm, its diameter 3.75 mm.

(Original description) The small shell has a columbelliform shape. It is white, spirally banded with bright yellow, centrally on the upper whorls, and twice, at the periphery and towards the base, of the body whorl. The shell contains 6 whorls, in our specimens imperfect as regards the protoconch. The three remaining whorls are angular below the impressed sutures, everywhere closely and obliquely ribbed, crossed by spiral incrassate lines, beautifully gemmate with small globular shining nodules at the points of junction, so that the whole surface is cancellate, the interstices being deep and smooth. The outer lip is thickened, crenulate without, eight or nine denticled within. The sinus is rather narrow, but deep and conspicuous. The columellar margin is slightly plicate, fairly straight. The siphonal canal is short.

== Distribution ==
This marine species occurs off Cuba, Aruba, Martinique and the Virgin Islands.
