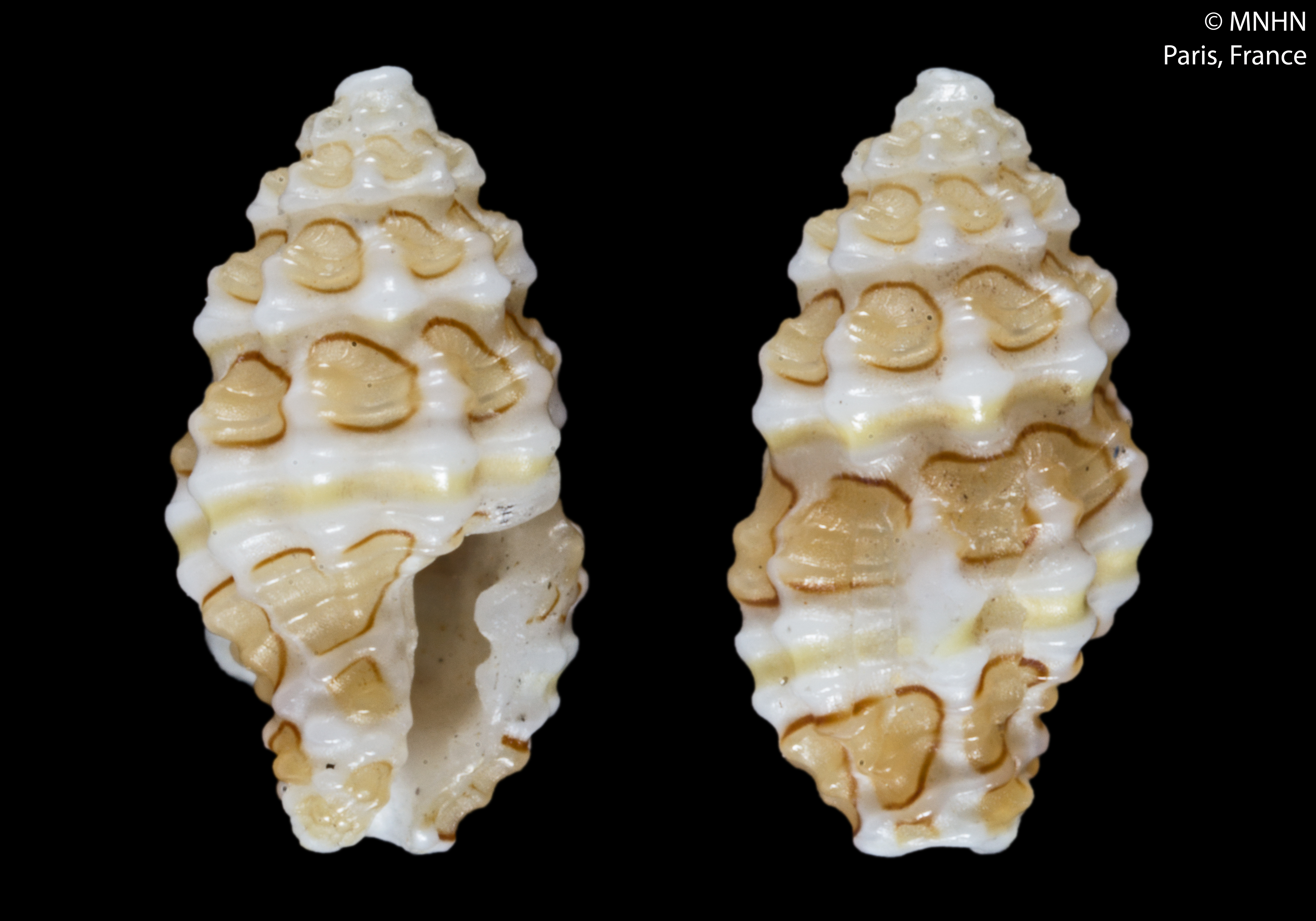

Scientific classification
- Kingdom: Animalia
- Phylum: Mollusca
- Class: Gastropoda
- Subclass: Caenogastropoda
- Order: Neogastropoda
- Superfamily: Conoidea
- Family: Raphitomidae
- Genus: Hemilienardia
- Species: H. ocellata

Binomial name
- Hemilienardia ocellata (Jousseaume, 1883)

Synonyms
- Glyphostoma ocellatum (Jousseaume, 1884); Lienardia ocellata Jousseaume, 1883 (original combination); Lienardia (Hemilienardia) ocellata Jousseaume, 1884; Mangilia ocellata (Jousseaume, 1884)

= Hemilienardia ocellata =

Species of gastropod

Hemilienardia ocellata is a species of sea snail, a marine gastropod mollusk in the family Raphitomidae.

== Description ==
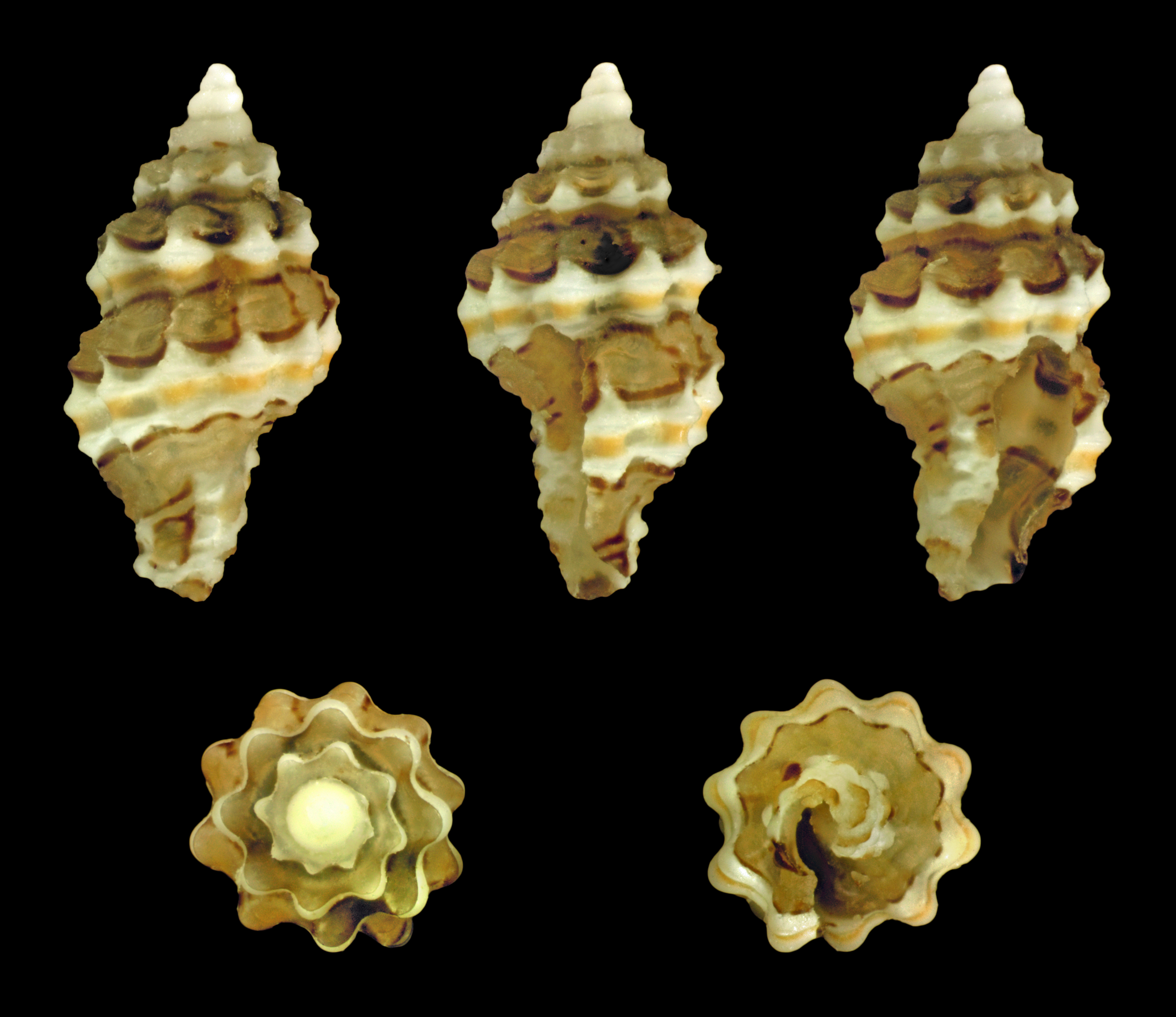
Juvenile

The length of the shell varies between 3 mm and 11 mm.

(Original description in Latin) The very small shell is ovate, and thick. It is decussated with raised ribs. It is whitish and is encircled by yellowish bands with a brown margin. It consists of 7 whorls, of which the first are smooth, and the others are longitudinally eight-folded and transversely ribbed. The aperture is narrow and sinuate, and the columella is bigranulate at the front. The outer lip is thickened and three-toothed inside, and the siphonal canal is short.

== Distribution ==
This marine species occurs off Mauritius, Fiji, the Philippines, Taiwan, and Queensland, Australia.
