= Amos Binney =

American physician and malacologist (1803–1847)

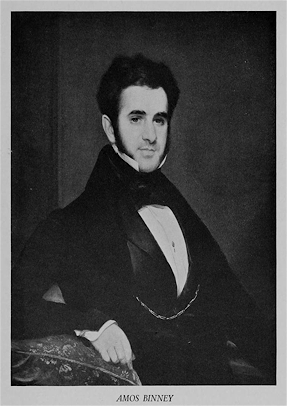
- Amos Binney
- Born: October 18, 1803; Boston, Massachusetts
- Died: February 18, 1847 (aged 43); Rome, Italy
- Education: Brown University and Harvard College
- Scientific career
- Fields: malacology

Amos Binney (October 18, 1803 – February 18, 1847) was an American medical doctor, malacologist, and co-founder and president of the Boston Society of Natural History.

== Biography ==
His son was William G. Binney.

He was a co-founder of Boston Society of Natural History in 1830 and he was a member of the society until his death in 1847. He was also a president of the society from May 17, 1843, to May 5, 1847.

He ran in the 1827 Boston mayoral election.

== Bibliography ==
- (1851–1855). The terrestrial air-breathing mollusks of the United States, and the adjacent territories of North America.
  - Volume 1 – edited by Augustus Addison Gould
  - Volume 2
  - Volume 3
  - Volume 4
