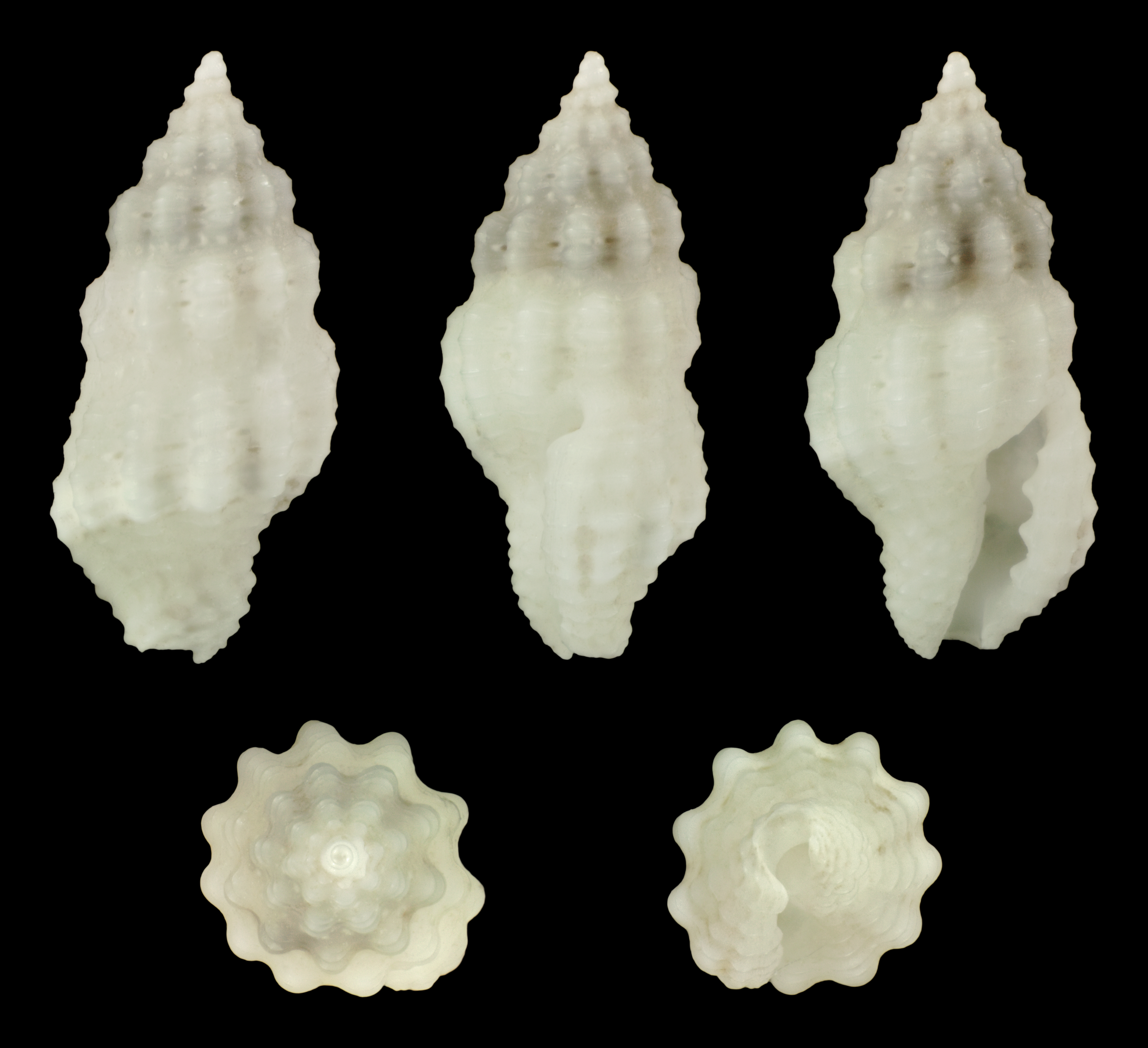
- A shell of Hemilienardia apiculata

Scientific classification
- Kingdom: Animalia
- Phylum: Mollusca
- Class: Gastropoda
- Subclass: Caenogastropoda
- Order: Neogastropoda
- Superfamily: Conoidea
- Family: Raphitomidae
- Genus: Hemilienardia
- Species: H. apiculata

Binomial name
- Hemilienardia apiculata (Montrouzier, 1864)

Synonyms
- Clathurella (Hemilienardia) apiculata (Montrouzier, 1864); Clathurella apiculata var. minor G. and H. Nevill, 1875; Glyphostoma apiculata Semper, 1876; Lienardia apiculata (Montrouzier in Souverbie & Montrouzier, 1864); Mangilia apiculata Montrouzier, 1864; Pleurotoma apiculata Montrouzier, 1864 (original combination)

= Hemilienardia apiculata =

Species of gastropod

Hemilienardia apiculata is a species of sea snail, a marine gastropod mollusk in the family Raphitomidae.

== Description ==
The length of the shell varies between 3 mm and 8 mm.

The shell is translucent white, with a row of opaque white spots about the middle of the body whorl.

== Distribution ==
This marine species occurs off New Caledonia and off Queensland, Australia
