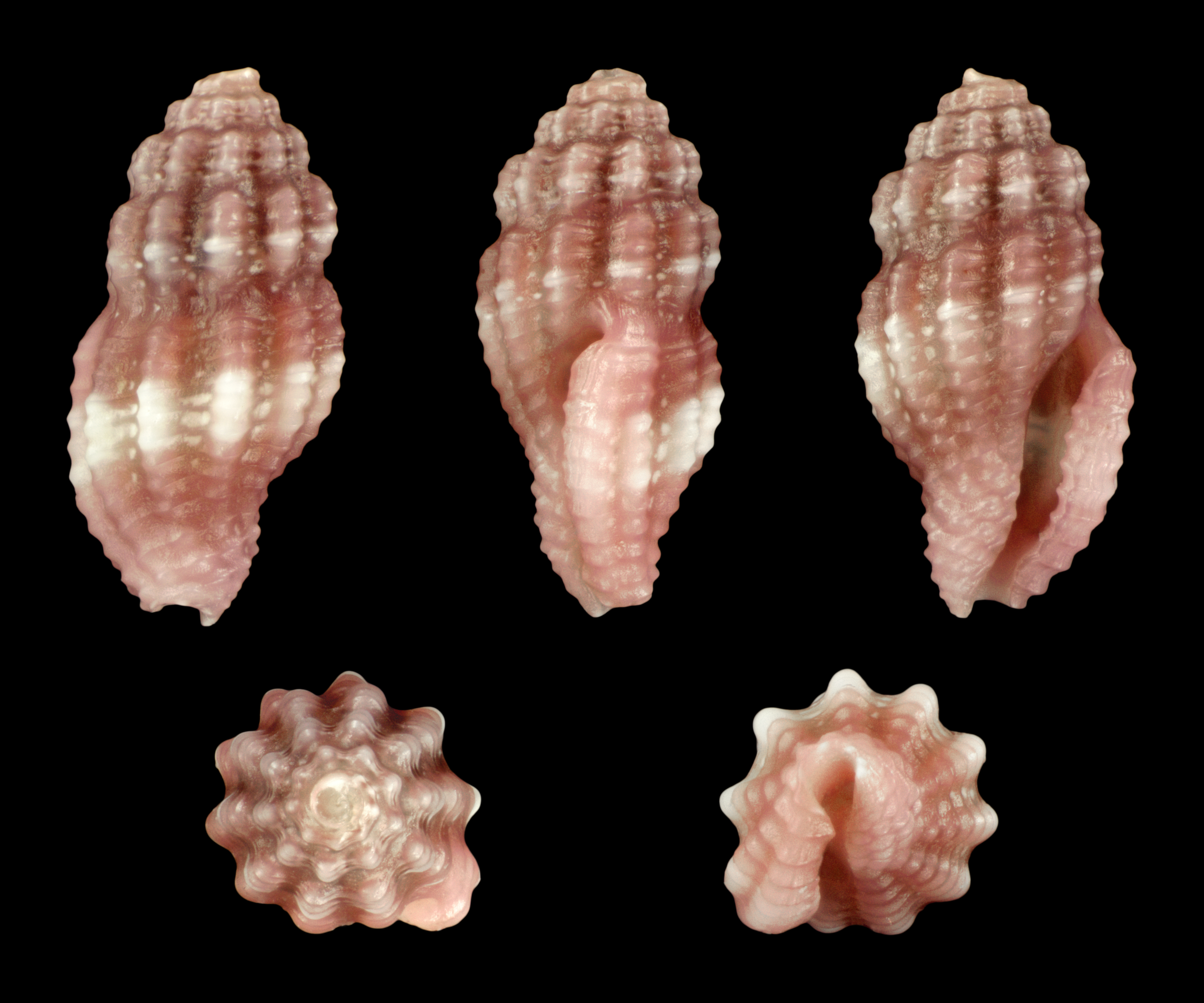
- A shell of Hemilienardia malleti

Scientific classification
- Kingdom: Animalia
- Phylum: Mollusca
- Class: Gastropoda
- Subclass: Caenogastropoda
- Order: Neogastropoda
- Superfamily: Conoidea
- Family: Raphitomidae
- Genus: Hemilienardia
- Species: H. malleti

Binomial name
- Hemilienardia malleti (Récluz, 1852)

Synonyms
- Clathurella pinguis Garrett, 1873; Lienardia malleti (Récluz, 1852); Pleurotoma malleti Récluz, 1852 (original combination)

= Hemilienardia malleti =

Species of gastropod

Hemilienardia malleti is a species of sea snail, a marine gastropod mollusk in the family Raphitomidae.

== Description ==
The length of the shell varies between 4 mm and 5 mm.

The shell is rose-red with a median white band. The inner margin of the aperture shows 5-6 closely set teeth.

== Distribution ==
This marine species occurs in the Western Pacific and off Taiwan.
