= Augustus Addison Gould =

American physician and conchologist (1805–1866)

Augustus Addison Gould FRS
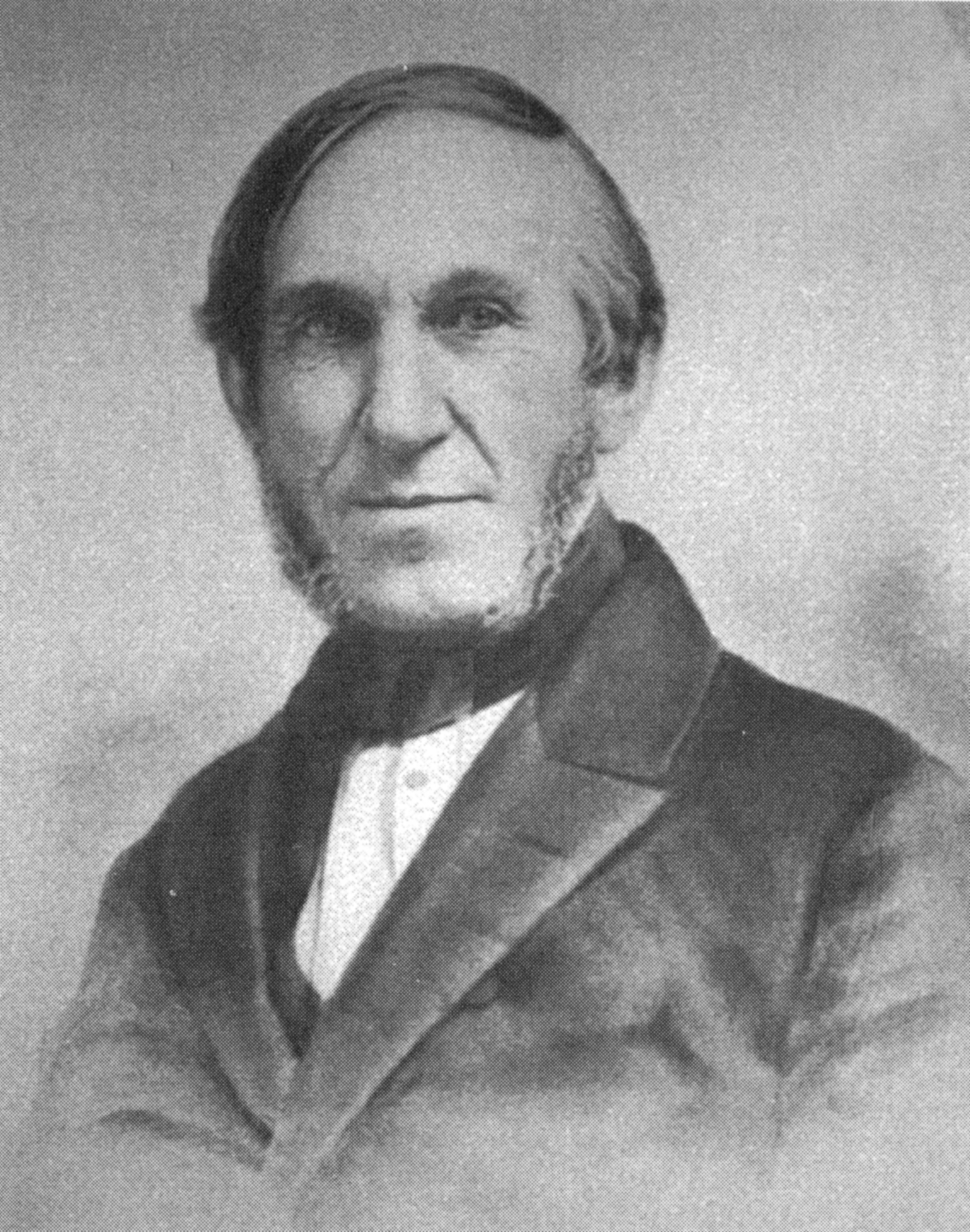
- Born: April 23, 1805; New Ipswich, New Hampshire
- Died: September 15, 1866 (aged 61); Boston, Massachusetts
- Resting place: Mount Auburn Cemetery
- Education: Harvard College
- Known for: Conchology, Mollusca and Shells, Report on the Invertebrata
- Scientific career
- Fields: conchology
- Author abbrev. (zoology): A. A. Gould

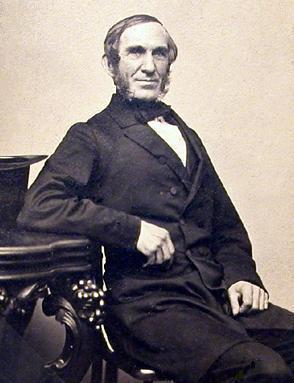

Augustus Addison Gould (April 23, 1805 – September 15, 1866) was an American medical doctor, naturalist and the foremost conchologist of his era. He described over 1,100 new species of mollusks, including all known mollusks of Massachusetts and the shells collected by two major government exploring expeditions. He was one of the first naturalists in America to recognize the importance of geographic distribution in the description of species.

== Biography ==
Born in New Ipswich, New Hampshire, he was the son of music teacher Nathaniel Duren Gould (1781–1864) who was also noted for his penmanship.

=== Physician ===
He graduated from Harvard College in 1825, and took his degree of doctor of medicine in 1830. "Establishing himself in Boston, he devoted himself to the practice of medicine, and finally rose to high professional rank and social position. He became president of the Massachusetts Medical Society, and was employed in editing the vital statistics of the state." In 1849, he was elected as a member of the American Philosophical Society. In 1855 he delivered the annual address at the Massachusetts Medical Society, entitled "Search Out the Secrets of Nature." He was its president from 1864 until his death. In 1856, he was appointed visiting physician to the Massachusetts General Hospital.

=== Naturalist ===
"As a conchologist his reputation was worldwide, and he was one of the pioneers of the science in America. His writings fill many pages of the publications of the Boston Society of Natural History (see vol. xi. p. 197 for a list) and other periodicals. He published with Louis Agassiz the Principles of Zoology (2nd ed. 1851)." He taught botany and zoology at Harvard for two years. When Charles Lyell visited the United States in order to pursue his geological investigations, he immediately sought the aid of Gould as a co-worker.

"Gould edited The terrestrial air-breathing mollusks of the United States, and the adjacent territories of North America – Volume 1 (1851–1855) of Amos Binney (1803–1847). He translated Lamarck's Genera of Shells (1833)."

"The two most important monuments to his scientific work, however, are Mollusca and Shells (vol. xii, 1852) of the United States Exploring Expedition, 1838-1842 under Lieutenant Charles Wilkes, published by the government, and the Report on the Invertebrata published by order of the legislature of Massachusetts in 1841. A second edition of the latter work was authorized in 1865, and published in 1870 after the author's death. In 1860, Gould also reported on shells collected by the North Pacific Exploring and Surveying Expedition."

"Gould was a corresponding member of all the prominent American scientific societies, and of many of those of Europe, including the London Royal Society."

He died in Boston on September 15, 1866, and was buried at Mount Auburn Cemetery.

== Bibliography ==
- Sterling, Keir B., ed. (1997). "Gould, Augustus Addison". Biographical Dictionary of American and Canadian Naturalists and Environmentalists. Greenwood Press.
- Wilson, J. G.; Fiske, J., eds. (1900). "Gould, Nathaniel Duren" . Appletons' Cyclopædia of American Biography. New York: D. Appleton.

Attribution
