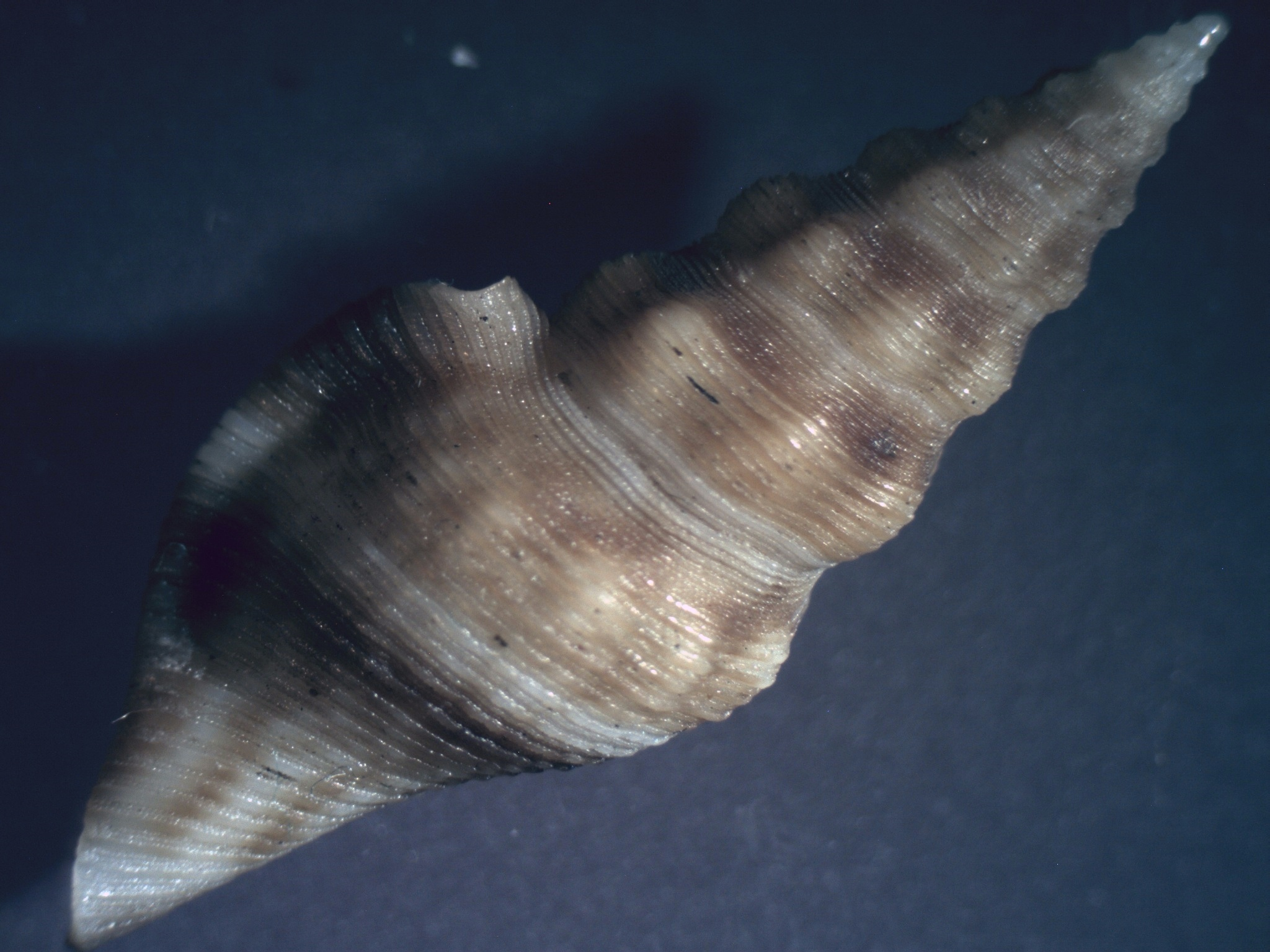
- Glyphostoma rostrata

Scientific classification
- Kingdom: Animalia
- Phylum: Mollusca
- Class: Gastropoda
- Subclass: Caenogastropoda
- Order: Neogastropoda
- Superfamily: Conoidea
- Family: Clathurellidae
- Genus: Glyphostoma; Gabb, 1873

Type species
- Glyphostoma dentiferum Gabb, 1872

Synonyms
- Clathurella (Glyphostoma); Euglyphostoma Woodring, 1970; Glyphostoma (Euglyphostoma) Woodring, 1970· accepted, alternate representation; Glyphostomops Bartsch, 1934; Mangilia (Glyphostoma) Gabb, 1873

= Glyphostoma =

Genus of gastropods

Glyphostoma (from Ancient Greek γλύφω (glúpho), meaning "carving", and στόμα (stóma), meaning "mouth") is a genus of sea snails, marine gastropod mollusks in the family Clathurellidae.

== Description ==
The shell has a fusiform shape. The siphonal canal is rather long. The genus is characterized by a very heavy outer lip, which is strongly rugose within. The inner lip is more or less wrinkled.

== Species ==
Species within the genus Glyphostoma include:

- Glyphostoma aguadillana (Dall & Simpson, 1901)
- Glyphostoma aliciae (Melvill & Standen, 1895)
- Glyphostoma alliteratum Hedley, 1915
- Glyphostoma bayeri Olsson, 1971
- Glyphostoma bertiniana (Tapparone-Canefri, 1878)
- Glyphostoma candida (Hinds, 1843)
- Glyphostoma canfieldi (Dall, 1871)
- Glyphostoma cara (Thiele, 1925)
- Glyphostoma claudoni (Dautzenberg, 1900)
- Glyphostoma coronaseminale Garcia, 2015
- Glyphostoma dedonderi Goethaels & Monsecour, 2008
- Glyphostoma dentiferum Gabb, 1872
- Glyphostoma dialitha (Melvill & Standen, 1896)
- Glyphostoma elsae Bartsch, 1934
- Glyphostoma epicasta Bartsch, 1934
- Glyphostoma gabbii (Dall, 1889)
- Glyphostoma golfoyaquense Maury, 1917
- Glyphostoma granulifera (Schepman, 1913)
- Glyphostoma gratula (Dall, 1881)
- Glyphostoma hervieri Dautzenberg, 1932
- Glyphostoma immaculatum Dall, 1908
- Glyphostoma infracincta (G.B. Sowerby III, 1893)
- Glyphostoma kihikihi Kay, 1979
- Glyphostoma leucum (Bush, 1893)
- Glyphostoma lyuhrurngae Lai, 2005
- Glyphostoma maldivica Sysoev, 1996
- Glyphostoma myrae Shasky, 1971
- Glyphostoma neglecta (Hinds, 1843)
- Glyphostoma oenoa Bartsch, 1934
- Glyphostoma oliverai Kilburn & Lan, 2004
- Glyphostoma otohimeae Kosuge, 1981
- Glyphostoma partefilosa Dall, 1919
- Glyphostoma phalera (Dall, 1889)
- Glyphostoma pilsbryi Schwengel, 1940
- Glyphostoma polynesiensis (Reeve, 1845)
- Glyphostoma purpurascens (Dunker, 1871)
- Glyphostoma pustulosa McLean & Poorman, 1971
- Glyphostoma rostrata Sysoev & Bouchet, 2001
- Glyphostoma rugosum (Mighels, 1845)
- Glyphostoma scalarinum (Deshayes, 1863)
- Glyphostoma scobina McLean & Poorman, 1971
- Glyphostoma supraplicata Sysoev, 1996
- Glyphostoma thalassoma Dall, 1908
- Glyphostoma turtoni (E. A. Smith, 1890)

Taxon inquirendum

- Glyphostoma tigroidellum Hervier, 1896

Species brought into synonymy

- Glyphostoma alphonsianum Hervier, 1896: synonym of Etrema alphonsianum (Hervier, 1896)
- Glyphostoma crosseanum Hervier, 1896: synonym of Lienardia crosseanum (Hervier, 1896)
- Glyphostoma cymodoce Dall, 1919: synonym of Crockerella cymodoce (Dall, 1919)
- Glyphostoma disconicum Hervier, 1896: synonym of Lienardia disconicum (Hervier, 1896)
- Glyphostoma gaidei Hervier, 1896: synonym of Lienardia gaidei (Hervier, 1896)
- Glyphostoma glabriplicatum Sowerby III, 1913: synonym of Etrema glabriplicatum (Sowerby III, 1913)
- Glyphostoma goubini Hervier, 1896: synonym of Lienardia goubini (Hervier, 1896)
- Glyphostoma gruveli Dautzenberg, 1932: synonym of Eucithara gruveli (Dautzenberg, 1932)
- Glyphostoma hendersoni Bartsch, 1934: synonym of Lioglyphostoma hendersoni (Bartsch, 1934)
- Glyphostoma herminea Bartsch, 1934: synonym of Miraclathurella herminea (Bartsch, 1934)
- Glyphostoma latirella (Melvill, J.C. & R. Standen, 1897, "1896"): synonym of Acrista latirella

(Melvill & Standen, 1896)

- Glyphostoma melanoxytum Hervier, 1896: synonym of Kermia melanoxytum (Hervier, 1896)
- Glyphostoma minutissimelirata Hervier, 1896: synonym of Etrema minutissimelirata (Hervier, 1896)
- Glyphostoma paucimaculata Angas, 1880: synonym of Etrema paucimaculata (Angas, 1880)
- Glyphostoma permiscere Nowell-Usticke, 1969: synonym of Truncadaphne permiscere (Nowell-Usticke, 1969)
- Glyphostoma roseocincta Oliver, 1915: synonym of Lienardia roseocincta (Oliver, 1915)
- Glyphostoma rubrocincta Smith, E.A., 1882: synonym of Eucithara vittata (Hinds, 1843)
- Glyphostoma strombillum Hervier, 1896: synonym of Lienardia strombillum (Hervier, 1896)
- Glyphostoma subspurcum Hervier, 1896: synonym of Kermia subspurcum (Hervier, 1896)
- Glyphostoma tenera Hedley, 1899: synonym of Etrema tenera (Hedley, 1899)
- Glyphostoma tribulationis Hedley, 1909: synonym of Heterocithara tribulationis (Hedley, 1909)
- Glyphostoma trigonostomum Hervier, 1896: synonym of Etrema trigonostomum (Hervier, 1896)
