= H. concinna =

H. concinna may refer to:

- Haemaphysalis concinna, a rodent tick
- Helicostyla concinna, a land snail
- Hemidaphne concinna, a sea snail
- Heterocithara concinna, a sea snail
- Hibbertia concinna, an Australian plant
