= G. candida =

G. candida may refer to:

- Gardenia candida, a plant species endemic to Fiji
- Gibberula candida, a very small sea snail species
- Glyphostoma candida, a sea snail species

== See also ==
- Candida (disambiguation)
