= Vexillum etremoides =

- Shell of Vexillum etremoides (holotype)

Scientific classification
- Kingdom: Animalia
- Phylum: Mollusca
- Class: Gastropoda
- Subclass: Caenogastropoda
- Order: Neogastropoda
- Superfamily: Turbinelloidea
- Family: Costellariidae
- Genus: Vexillum
- Species: †V. etremoides

Binomial name
- †Vexillum etremoides (Finlay, 1924)

Synonyms
- † Costellaria etremoides (Finlay, 1924); † Uromitra etremoides Finlay, 1924

Extinct species of gastropod

Vexillum etremoides is an extinct species of sea snail, a marine gastropod mollusk, in the family Costellariidae, the ribbed miters.

== Description ==
The length of the shell attains 14 mm, its diameter 4 mm.

(Original description as Uromitra etremoides) The small shell is elongate-fusiform, with strong discontinuous axial ridges and fine close spirals. The protoconch is pupiform, and consists of 3 almost symmetrical smooth whorls, bluntly pointed, distinctly marked off from brephic stage. The spiral ribs are very obscure on earlier whorls, 4 on first, 5 on second, and 6 on the rest, sometimes 7 on penultimate, 16 spirals on the body whorl. The spirals are lowly convex. The interstices vary in width, seldom linear, usually subequal to ribs, widening near beak. The axial ribs are numerous and irregular in the brephic stage, but soon follow each other regularly, 7–9 per whorl Generally they are in line with those on contiguous whorls, but slope a little backwards, vanishing on lower half of the body-whorl. The interstices are usually slightly wider. The axial ribs are very much stouter and more prominent than spirals, which cross them without forming nodules. Growth-lines are rather conspicuous. The spire is narrowly conic. The outlines are straight, in young shells one and a third times height of the aperture, in adult shells more than one and a half times. The shell contains 10 whorls. The body-whorl is subangulated below its periphery, then suddenly contracted towards beak. The suture is impressed, undulating, submargined by narrow band. The apertureis narrowly ovate; high, acutely subangled above, produced below into a short oblique siphonal canal with straightened base. The outer lip convex, thin and sharp. The columella is straight, vertical, with 3 oblique, strong plaits, decreasing in size anteriorly.

This Vexillum bears comparison with no New Zealand or Australian Tertiary shells. Its characteristic sculpture is reminiscent of the turrid genera Etrema, and especially Pseudorhaphitoma. Young shells are probably confused in existing collections with Vexillum fenestratum Sut., to which they bear a deceptive resemblance, but they can at once be distinguished by the different protoconch and strong columellar plaits.

== Distribution ==
Fossils of this marine species were found in Tertiary strata in New Zealand.
