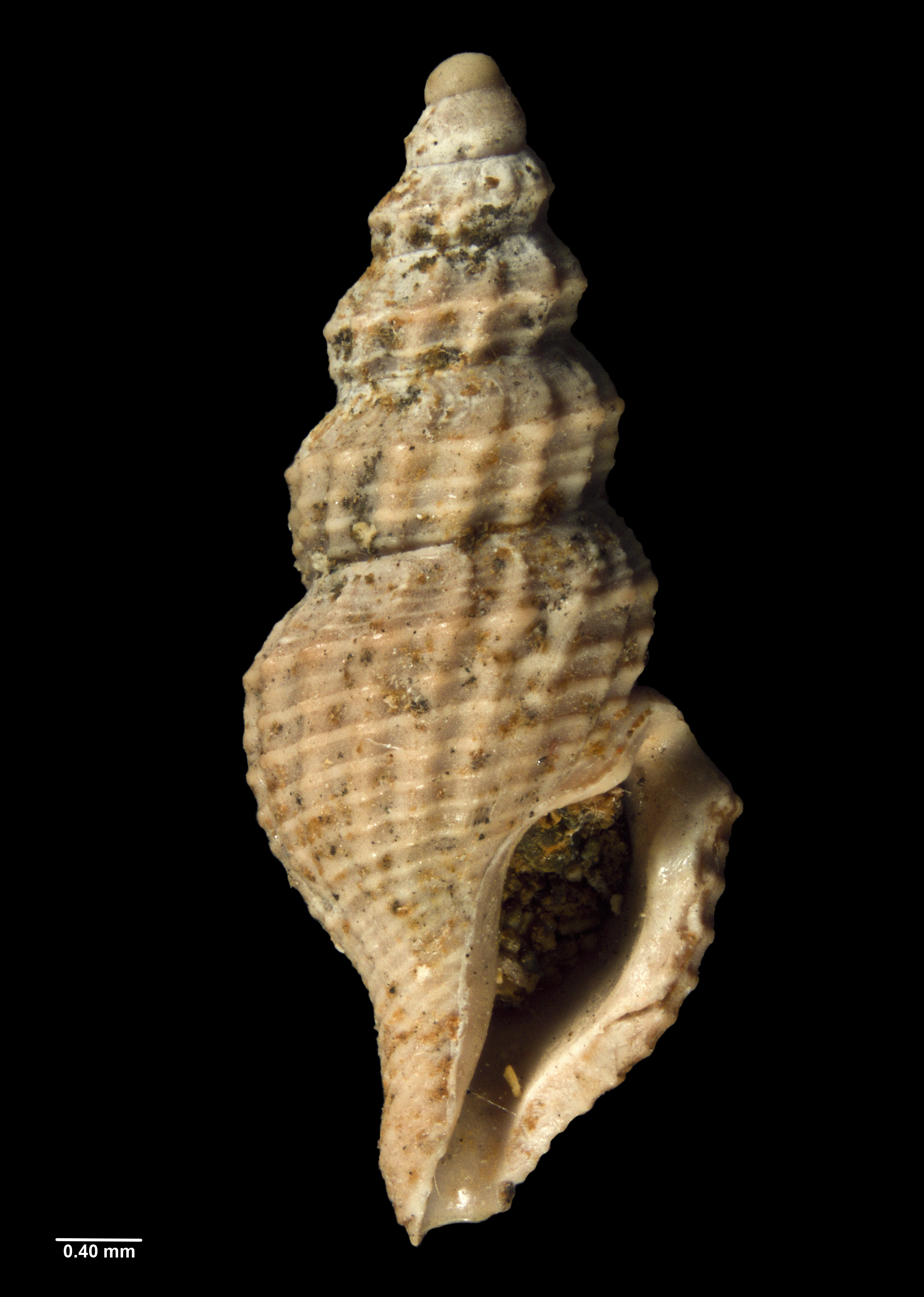
- Holotype from Auckland War Memorial Museum

Scientific classification
- Kingdom: Animalia
- Phylum: Mollusca
- Class: Gastropoda
- Subclass: Caenogastropoda
- Order: Neogastropoda
- Family: Clathurellidae
- Genus: Etrema
- Species: †E. janjukiensis

Binomial name
- †Etrema janjukiensis A. W. B. Powell, 1944

= Etrema janjukiensis =

Etrema janjukiensis Temporal range: early Miocene

Extinct species of gastropod

Etrema janjukiensis is an extinct species of sea snail, a marine gastropod mollusc, in the family Pseudomelatomidae. Fossils of the species date to early Miocene strata of the Port Phillip Basin of Victoria, Australia, and the Bass Basin of Tasmania.

== Description ==
In the original description, Powell described the species as follows:

Similar to [Heterocithara granolirata] in shape and primary sculpture, but without the secondary granular lirations. Also the sinus is deeper and there is a strong parietal tubercle. Protoconch as in granolirata. Spire-whorls with 4-5 lirations on the shoulder, 4 narrow spiral cords from peripheral angle to lower suture, the peripheral cord being no stronger than the others. Body-whorl with about 22 spirals, the last 12 linear-spaced on the anterior end. No interstitial threads (excepting 1 below the carina on body-whorl in the holotype only). Axials narrowly rounded, extending from upper suture over the base to the neck, 16 per whorl, weaker on shoulder.

The holotype of the species measures 5.7 mm (0.22 in) in height and has a diameter of 2.4 mm (0.094 in).

== Taxonomy ==
The species was first described by A. W. B. Powell in 1944. The holotype was collected at an unknown date prior to 1944 from Fossil Bluff Sandstone at Fossil Bluff, a location close to Wynyard, Tasmania. It is held by the Auckland War Memorial Museum.

== Distribution ==
This extinct marine species occurs in early Miocene strata of the Port Phillip Basin of Victoria, Australia, and the Bass Basin of Tasmania, including the Puebla Formation and Freestone Cove Sandstone.

== Gallery ==
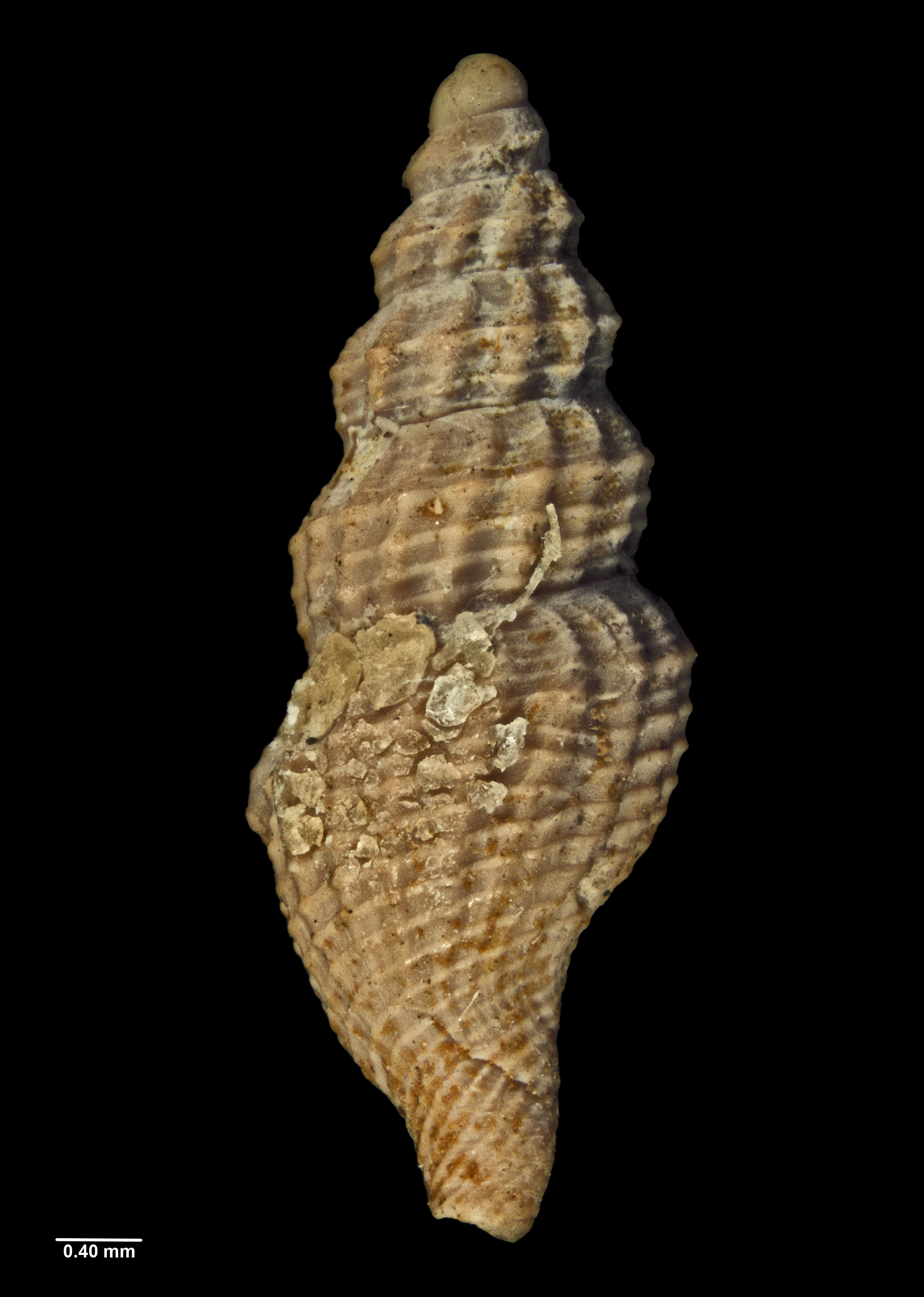
Reverse view of holotype

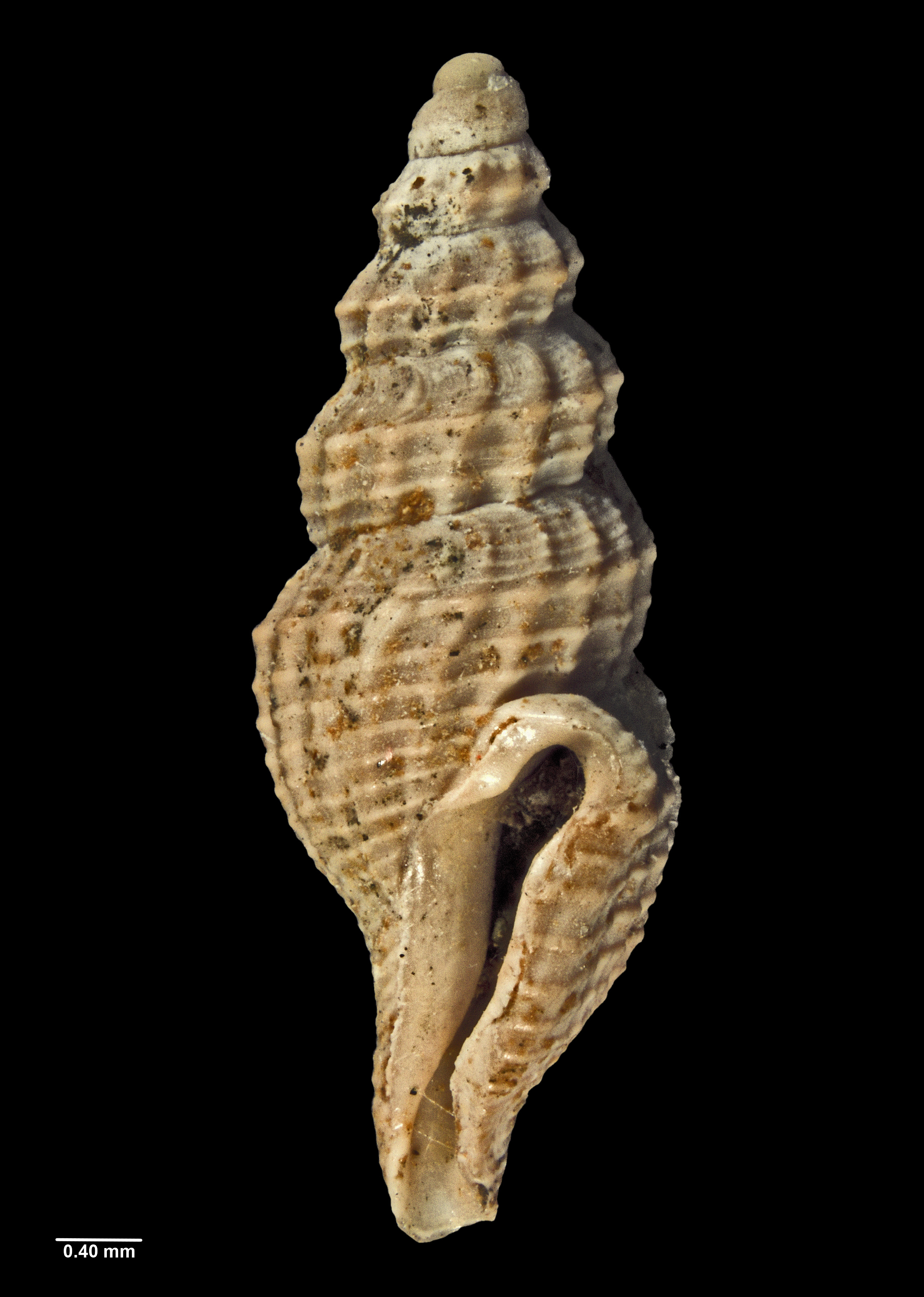
Side view of holotype
