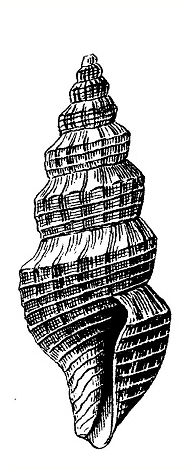
- Drawing of a shell of Pleurotomella circumvoluta

Scientific classification
- Kingdom: Animalia
- Phylum: Mollusca
- Class: Gastropoda
- Subclass: Caenogastropoda
- Order: Neogastropoda
- Superfamily: Conoidea
- Family: Raphitomidae
- Genus: Pleurotomella
- Species: P. circumvoluta

Binomial name
- Pleurotomella circumvoluta (Watson, 1881)

Synonyms
- Clathurella circumvoluta Tryon, 1884; Defrancia circumvoluta Paetel, 1888; Drillia detecta (Dall, 1881); Pleurotoma circumvoluta R.B. Watson, 1881 (original description); Pleurotoma (Defrancia) circumvoluta R.B. Watson, 1888; Pleurotoma (Drillia) detecta Dall, 1881 (non des Moulins, 1842)

= Pleurotomella circumvoluta =

Species of gastropod

Pleurotomella circumvoluta is a species of sea snail, a marine gastropod mollusk in the family Raphitomidae.

== Description ==
The shell grows to a length of 12 mm.

The shell has a strong superficial resemblance to Glyphostoma gratula (Dall, 1881), but with a totally different protoconch, and with differences in details of sculpture. It also has not the minute punctation. The color of the shell is white or ashy gray. The protoconch and its whorls are heliciform, with a sculpture of slightly raised lamellae waved backward from the middle point of the periphery both ways. Under these are also fine revolving raised lines. The shell contains 9 whorls. The remainder show a transverse sculpture of from sixteen to (on the body whorl) eighteen narrow raised riblets passing entirely over the whorls, quite faint on the band and only obsolete on the columella and the siphonal canal. Beside these the lines of growth are unusually distinct, somewhat raised and rounded, and are especially well marked on the notch band. The spiral sculpture consists of three or four (on the body whorl thirteen) raised rounded threads slightly swollen where they cross the transverse riblets. Between these are usually two, but sometimes as many as four, similar but finer threads, which also invade the band and cover the columella, but cross the riblets without enlarging. The interspaces between the ribs are less deep, and the whole sculpture more uniform and less prominent than in Glyphostoma gratula. The suture is appressed. The band is less prominent than in Glyphostoma gratula. The anal sinus is shallow. The columella is nearly straight. Thesiphonal canal is very slightly recurved. The outer lip (not adult) is thin.

== Distribution ==
P. circumvoluta can be found in Atlantic waters, in the Florida Strait. and in the Gulf of Mexico off the Dry Tortugas.
