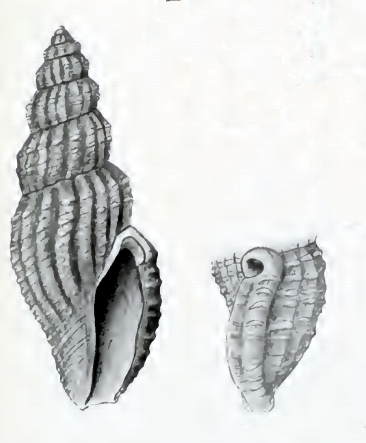
- Original image of a shell of Heterocithara semicarinata

Scientific classification
- Kingdom: Animalia
- Phylum: Mollusca
- Class: Gastropoda
- Subclass: Caenogastropoda
- Order: Neogastropoda
- Superfamily: Conoidea
- Family: Mangeliidae
- Genus: Heterocithara
- Species: H. semicarinata

Binomial name
- Heterocithara semicarinata (Pilsbry, 1904)

Synonyms
- Guraleus semicarinatus (Pilsbry, 1904); Mangilia semicarinata Pilsbry, 1904 (original combination)

= Heterocithara semicarinata =

Species of gastropod

Heterocithara semicarinata is a species of sea snail, a marine gastropod mollusk in the family Mangeliidae.

== Description ==
The length of the shell attains 7 mm, its diameter 2.7 mm.

(Original description) The rather thin, fusiform-turreted shell has a white color with some brown stains below the suture and a brown spot at the middle of the lip-varix. The sculpture consists of many slightly oblique and arcuate longitudinal riblets about as wide as their intervals, and sixteen in number on the body whorl. These are crossed by spaced spiral threads, about 18 from the shoulder down on the body whorl, a little widened where they pass over the riblets. The spaces between the threads and above the shoulder are very finely striate spirally. The shell contains 7 whorls, the first 1½ rounded, radially weakly costulate, several whorls following convex, rounded, the last 2 or 3 whorls angular at the shoulder. The body whorl bears a narrow, elevated, arcuate lip-varix. The aperture is narrow, Both.lips are slightly arcuate; blunt at the ends, smooth within. The anal sinus is rather deep and rounded, the varix curving back of it.

== Distribution ==
This marine species occurs off Japan.
