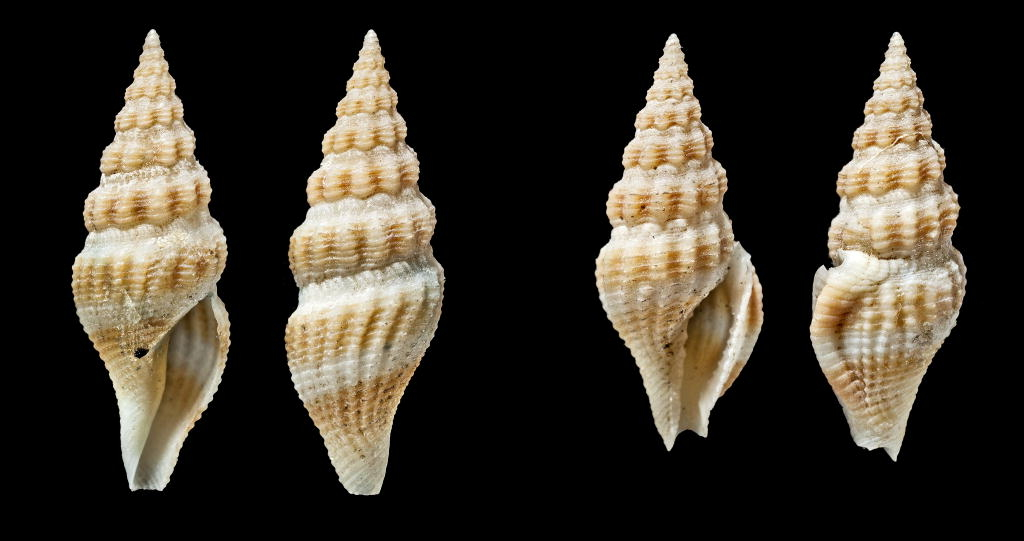

Scientific classification
- Kingdom: Animalia
- Phylum: Mollusca
- Class: Gastropoda
- Subclass: Caenogastropoda
- Order: Neogastropoda
- Family: Clathurellidae
- Genus: Glyphostoma
- Species: G. turtoni

Binomial name
- Glyphostoma turtoni (E. A. Smith, 1890)

Synonyms
- Pleurotoma (Drillia) turtoni

= Glyphostoma turtoni =

Species of marine gastropods

Glyphostoma turtoni is a species of sea snail, a marine gastropod mollusc in the family Clathurellidae.

== Description ==
The shell of Glyphostoma turtoni is relatively small, reaching a length of approximately 18 millimeters and a diameter of about 6 millimeters. It is shortly fusiform (spindle-shaped) with a moderately elongated spire composed of approximately 10–13 whorls.

The first whorl is smooth and convex, while the following two are characterized by a central keel. The remaining whorls are concave in the upper portion and become convex below. The shell displays around 12 short axial ribs, which are most prominent on the lower parts of the whorls and become faint or obsolete above. These ribs are intersected by 4 to 6 spiral lirae, creating a cancellated or crosshatched texture. Below the suture, the surface exhibits a wrinkled appearance.

The body whorl is contracted towards its base. The aperture is narrow and shorter than the total shell length. The outer lip is thin at the margin but thickened externally by a curved, varix-like rib. The inner surface of the outer lip is denticulated. The columella is white and bears several transverse denticles.

The sinus is deep, indicating a siphonal function typical of predatory neogastropods. The siphonal canal is short and recurved.

The coloration of Glyphostoma turtoni is considered "attractive" as the spire displays alternating zones of white and yellow, with the yellow regions situated on the ribbed lower portions of the whorls and interrupted by brown coloration between the ribs. The lower half of the body whorl is yellowish, appearing speckled with brown, except for the pale-colored extremity.

== Taxonomy ==
Glyphostoma turtoni was originally described under the genus Pleurotoma Lamarck, 1799, as Pleurotoma (Drillia) turtoni in the publication Report on the Marine Molluscan Fauna of the Island of St. Helena.

As the genus Pleurotoma was historically broad and included a diverse range of species, it was later split into smaller, more natural genera based on detailed shell morphology and anatomical characteristics.

One of these new genera Glyphostoma was established to include species like Glyphostoma turtoni that share specific diagnostic features.

Consequently, Pleurotoma (Drillia) turtoni was reassigned to Glyphostoma turtoni after its shell features such as the denticulated columella and distinct rib patterns, that were corresponding to the defining traits of the genus Glyphostoma.

== Distribution ==
This species is distributed in the eastern South Atlantic Ocean living in shallow to moderately deep waters, in rocky or sandy sea floors, in warm, clear, nutrient-rich marine habitats surrounding the island of St. Helena, where it preys on smaller invertebrates.
