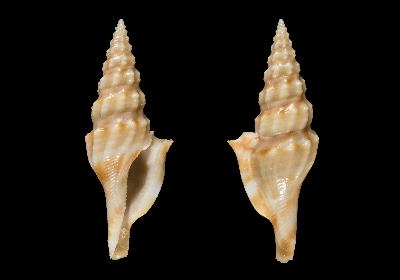
- Shells of Glyphostoma dedonderi (holotype in the MNHN, Paris)

Scientific classification
- Kingdom: Animalia
- Phylum: Mollusca
- Class: Gastropoda
- Subclass: Caenogastropoda
- Order: Neogastropoda
- Family: Clathurellidae
- Genus: Glyphostoma
- Species: G. dedonderi

Binomial name
- Glyphostoma dedonderi Goethaels & Monsecour, 2008

= Glyphostoma dedonderi =

Species of gastropod

Glyphostoma dedonderi is a species of sea snail, a marine gastropod mollusc in the family Clathurellidae.

== Description ==
The size of an adult shell varies between 22 mm and 32 mm.

== Distribution ==
This species occurs in the Pacific Ocean off the Philippines and Indonesia.
