= Heterocithara marwicki =

Scientific classification
- Kingdom: Animalia
- Phylum: Mollusca
- Class: Gastropoda
- Subclass: Caenogastropoda
- Order: Neogastropoda
- Superfamily: Conoidea
- Family: Mangeliidae
- Genus: Heterocithara
- Species: H. marwicki

Binomial name
- Heterocithara marwicki Maxwell, 1988

Species of mollusc

Heterocithara marwicki is an extinct species of sea snail, a marine gastropod mollusk in the family Mangeliidae.

== Distribution ==
This extinct marine species is endemic to New Zealand.
