= Glyphostoma epicasta =

Scientific classification
- Kingdom: Animalia
- Phylum: Mollusca
- Class: Gastropoda
- Subclass: Caenogastropoda
- Order: Neogastropoda
- Family: Clathurellidae
- Genus: Glyphostoma
- Species: G. epicasta

Binomial name
- Glyphostoma epicasta Bartsch, 1934

Species of gastropod

Glyphostoma epicasta is a species of sea snail, a marine gastropod mollusc in the family Clathurellidae.

== Description ==
The size of an adult shell varies between 14 mm and 31 mm.

== Distribution ==
Glyphostoma epicasta can be found in the Caribbean Sea, along Colombia and Puerto Rico, in the Gulf of Mexico along Louisiana and in the Atlantic Ocean along Brazil.
