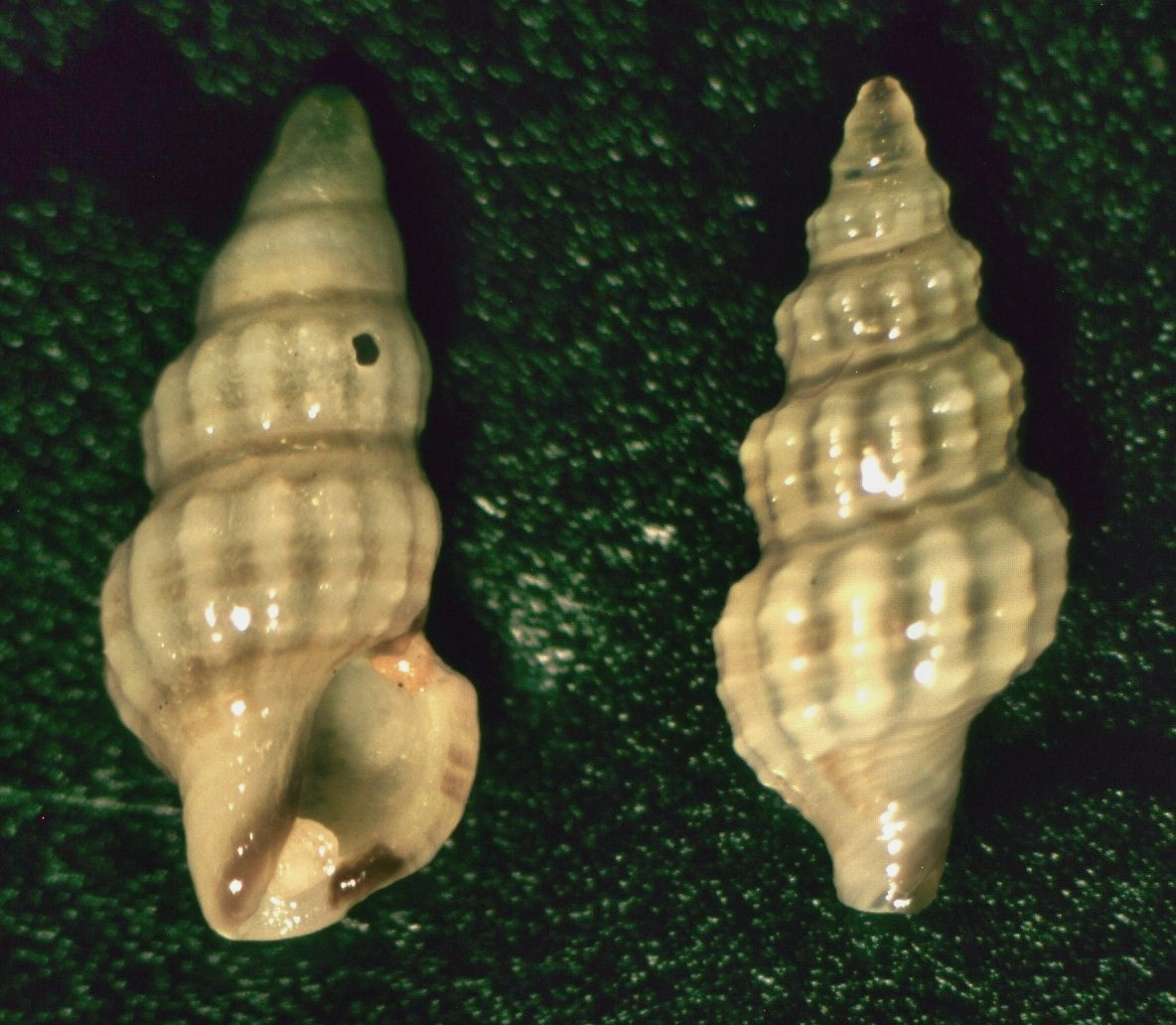
- Etrema bicolor

Scientific classification
- Kingdom: Animalia
- Phylum: Mollusca
- Class: Gastropoda
- Subclass: Caenogastropoda
- Order: Neogastropoda
- Superfamily: Conoidea
- Family: Clathurellidae
- Genus: Etrema; Hedley, 1918

Type species
- Mangilia aliciae Melvill & Standen, 1895

Synonyms
- Etremopa Oyama, 1953; Etrema (Etremopa) Oyama, 1953· accepted, alternate representation; Lienardia (Etrema) Hedley, 1918 superseded rank; Mangelia (Etrema) Hedley, 1918 superseded rank

= Etrema =

Genus of gastropods

Etrema is a genus of sea snails, marine gastropod mollusks in the family Clathurellidae.

== Species ==
According to the World Register of Marine Species (WoRMS), species with valid names within the genus Etrema include:

- Etrema aliciae (Melvill & Standen, 1895)
- Etrema alliterata (Hedley, 1915)
- Etrema alphonsianum (Hervier, 1896): mentioned in OBIS as Etrema (Etrema) alphonsiana (Hervier, 1896)
- Etrema argillacea (Hinds, 1843)
- Etrema bicolor (Angas, 1871)
- † Etrema bidens (Tenison Woods, 1879)
- Etrema capillata Hedley, 1922
- Etrema carinata Bozzetti, 2009
- Etrema catapasta Hedley, 1922
- Etrema constricta Laseron, 1954
- Etrema cosmia (Winckworth, 1940)
- Etrema crassilabrum (Reeve, 1843)
- Etrema crassina (Angas, 1880)
- Etrema cratis Kilburn & Dekker, 2008
- Etrema curculio (G. Nevill & H. Nevill, 1870)
- Etrema curtisiana Hedley, 1922
- Etrema denseplicata (Dunker, 1871)
- Etrema elegans Hedley, 1922
- Etrema firma Hedley, 1922
- Etrema gainesii (Pilsbry, 1895)
- † Etrema gippslandensis A. W. B. Powell, 1944
- Etrema glabriplicata (G. B. Sowerby III, 1913)
- Etrema gravelyi (Winckworth, 1940)
- Etrema haesitata Horro, Gori, Rosado & Rolán, 2021
- Etrema hedleyi (Oliver, 1915)
- Etrema huberti (Sowerby III, 1893)
- † Etrema hyugaensis Shuto, 1961
- † Etrema janjukiensis A. W. B. Powell, 1944
- Etrema jeanpierrevezzaroi T. Cossignani, 2022
- † Etrema kaipara Powell, 1942
- Etrema kitcheni Laseron, 1954
- Etrema kymatoessa (R. B. Watson, 1886)
- Etrema labiosa Hedley, 1922
- Etrema lata (Smith E. A., 1888)
- Etrema leukospiralis Chen & Huang, 2005
- Etrema levicosta Laseron, 1954
- Etrema lineoangulosa Horro, Gori & Renda, 2025
- † Etrema mangelioides (Tate, 1888)
- Etrema maryae (McLean & Poorman, 1971)
- Etrema minutissimelirata (Hervier, 1896)
- Etrema minyuensis L.-W. Lin, J.-L. Jiang & Y. Shao, 2025
- † Etrema mirabilis A. W. B. Powell, 1944
- † Etrema morningtonensis Chapple, 1934
- Etrema nassoides (Reeve, 1845)
- † Etrema obdita (G. F. Harris, 1897)
- Etrema orirufa Hedley, 1922
- † Etrema palauensis Ladd, 1982
- Etrema parvula Bozzetti, 2020
- Etrema paucimaculata (Angas, 1880)
- Etrema perlissa (Smith E. A., 1904)
- Etrema polydesma Hedley, 1922
- † Etrema praespurca Chapman & Crespin, 1928
- † Etrema pseudoelegans Chapman & Crespin, 1928
- Etrema pyramis Laseron, 1954
- Etrema ravella Hedley, 1922
- † Etrema saigoensis Makiyama, 1927
- Etrema scalarina (Deshayes, 1863)
- Etrema sparula Hedley, 1922
- Etrema spurca (Hinds, 1843)
- Etrema streptonotus (Pilsbry, 1904)
- Etrema subauriformis (Smith E. A., 1879)
- Etrema tenera (Hedley, 1899)
- Etrema texta (Dunker, 1860)
- Etrema tortilabia Hedley, 1922
- Etrema trigonostomum (Hervier, 1896)
- † Etrema turrita Chapple, 1941
- † Etrema weymouthensis Ludbrook, 1958

The Indo-Pacific Molluscan Database also includes the following species with names in current use :

- Etrema lemniscata (G. & H. Nevill, 1875)

Subgenus Etremopsis Powell, 1942

- Etrema albata (Smith, 1882)

Species brought into synonymy

- Etrema acricula Hedley, 1922: synonym of Nannodiella acricula (Hedley, 1922)
- Etrema culmea Hedley, 1922: synonym of Etrema crassilabrum (Reeve, 1843)
- † Etrema exsculpta A. W. B. Powell, 1944: synonym of Etrema turrita Chapple, 1941
- Etrema gainesii (Pilsbry, 1895): synonym of Clathurella gainesii Pilsbry, 1895
- † Etrema granolirata A. W. B. Powell, 1944: synonym of Heterocithara granolirata (A. W. B. Powell, 1944)
- † Etrema peramoena Ludbrook, 1941: synonym of Filodrillia peramoena (Ludbrook, 1941)
- Etrema royi (G. B. Sowerby III, 1913): synonym of Clathurella royi G. B. Sowerby III, 1913
- Etrema rubroapicata (E. A. Smith, 1882): synonym of Minicyrillia rubroapicata (E. A. Smith, 1882)
- † Etrema trophonalis Chapman & Crespin, 1928: synonym of Retizafra trophonalis (Chapman & Crespin, 1928)
