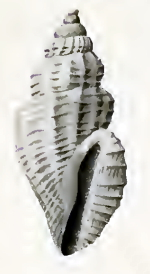
- Shell of Heterocithara zebuensis

Scientific classification
- Kingdom: Animalia
- Phylum: Mollusca
- Class: Gastropoda
- Subclass: Caenogastropoda
- Order: Neogastropoda
- Superfamily: Conoidea
- Family: Mangeliidae
- Genus: Heterocithara
- Species: H. zebuensis

Binomial name
- Heterocithara zebuensis (Reeve, 1846)

Synonyms
- Cithara zebuensis Hidalgo, 1904; Mangilia derelicta (Reeve, 1846); Mangelia zebuensis Reeve, 1846 (original combination)

= Heterocithara zebuensis =

Species of mollusc

Heterocithara zebuensis is a species of sea snail, a marine gastropod mollusc in the family Mangeliidae.

== Description ==
The length of the shell attains 6 mm. The light brown shell is longitudinally strongly ribbed, transversely obsoletely striated.

== Distribution ==
This marine species occurs off Australia (Queensland) and off the Philippines.
