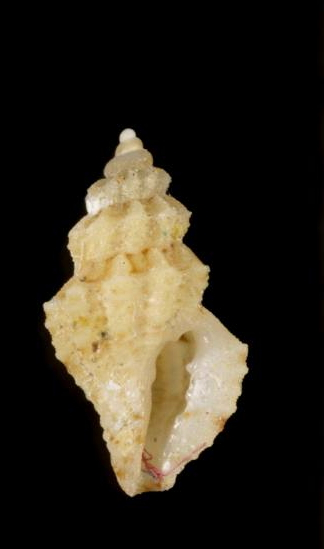
- shell of Heterocithara himerta (museum specimen at MNHN, Paris)

Scientific classification
- Kingdom: Animalia
- Phylum: Mollusca
- Class: Gastropoda
- Subclass: Caenogastropoda
- Order: Neogastropoda
- Superfamily: Conoidea
- Family: Mangeliidae
- Genus: Heterocithara
- Species: H. himerta

Binomial name
- Heterocithara himerta (Melvill & Standen, 1896)

Synonyms
- Daphnella (Mangilia) himerta (Melvill & Standen, 1896); Mangilia himerta Melvill & Standen, 1896 (original combination)

= Heterocithara himerta =

Species of mollusc

Heterocithara himerta is a species of sea snail, a marine gastropod mollusk in the family Mangeliidae.

== Description ==
The length of the shell attains 4 mm, its diameter 2 mm.

(Original description) This short, pyramidal-fusiform shell has much in common with Guraleus himerodes (Melvill & Standen, 1896), but is smaller and of a pale yellow-ochre colour throughout. The whorls are angularly turreted, they are six in number, including the two vitreous apical whorls. At the sutures there is a quasi-crenulation, owing to the commencement of the prominent longitudinal ribs, there crossed by acute lirae, the interstices being smooth. Faint brown transverse spots adorn the sutures and the middle of the body whorl the back of the outer lip is likewise ornamented with one ochre median blotch and faint signs exist in some specimens of another, or, indeed, two more alternating with white, both above and below the median blotch just mentioned. The aperture is narrow and oblong. The sinus is wide. The outer lip is incrassate. The columella is simple.

== Distribution ==
This marine species is occurs off Réunion, Papua New Guinea and Lifu.
