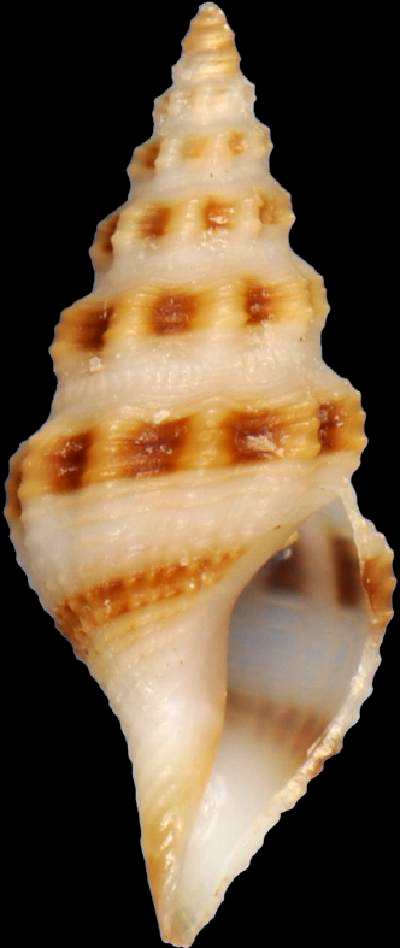
- Shell of Glyphostoma gabbii (specimen at MNHN, Paris)

Scientific classification
- Kingdom: Animalia
- Phylum: Mollusca
- Class: Gastropoda
- Subclass: Caenogastropoda
- Order: Neogastropoda
- Family: Clathurellidae
- Genus: Glyphostoma
- Species: G. gabbii

Binomial name
- Glyphostoma gabbii (Dall, 1889)

Synonyms
- Drillia (Glyphosotoma) gabbii (Dall, 1889); Mangilia gabbii Dall, 1889

= Glyphostoma gabbii =

Species of gastropod

Glyphostoma gabbii, common name Gabb's tooth turrid, is a species of sea snail, a marine gastropod mollusc in the family Clathurellidae.

== Distribution ==
Glyphostoma gabbii can be found in Atlantic waters, ranging from eastern Florida to Brazil., in the Caribbean Sea, the Gulf of Mexico and the Lesser Antilles.

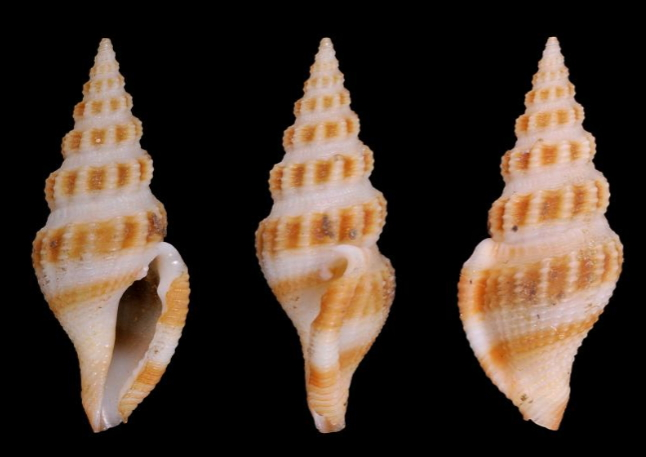
Glyphostoma gabbii, syntype at the Smithsonian Institution
