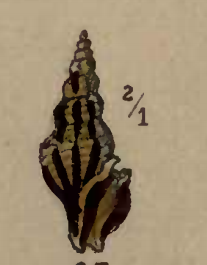
- Drawing of Glyphostoma neglecta

Scientific classification
- Kingdom: Animalia
- Phylum: Mollusca
- Class: Gastropoda
- Subclass: Caenogastropoda
- Order: Neogastropoda
- Family: Clathurellidae
- Genus: Glyphostoma
- Species: G. neglecta

Binomial name
- Glyphostoma neglecta (Hinds, 1843)

Synonyms
- Agathotoma phryne Dall, W.H., 1919; Clathurella aurea Carpenter, P.P., 1857; Clavatula neglecta Hinds, 1843; Glyphostoma myrakeenae Olsson, A.A., 1964; Lioglyphostoma adana Dall, W.H., 1919; Lioglyphostoma armstrongi Hertlein, L.G. & A.M. Strong, 1955

= Glyphostoma neglecta =

Species of gastropod

Glyphostoma neglecta is a species of sea snail, a marine gastropod mollusc in the family Clathurellidae.

== Description ==
The size of an adult shell varies between 6 mm and 14 mm. The ribs are rounded, approximated, and transversely elevately striated. The color of the shell is rusty brown.

== Distribution ==
This species occurs in the Pacific Ocean, from Mexico to Ecuador.
