= Etrema maryae =

Scientific classification
- Kingdom: Animalia
- Phylum: Mollusca
- Class: Gastropoda
- Subclass: Caenogastropoda
- Order: Neogastropoda
- Superfamily: Conoidea
- Family: Clathurellidae
- Genus: Etrema
- Species: E. maryae

Binomial name
- Etrema maryae (McLean & Poorman, 1971)

Synonyms
- Clathurella maryae McLean & Poorman, 1971 (combinação original)

Species of gastropod

Etrema maryae is a species of sea snail, a marine gastropod mollusk in the family Clathurellidae.

== Distribution ==
This species occurs in the Pacific Ocean off Mexico and the Galapagos Islands.
