= Glyphostoma bertinianum =

Scientific classification
- Kingdom: Animalia
- Phylum: Mollusca
- Class: Gastropoda
- Subclass: Caenogastropoda
- Order: Neogastropoda
- Family: Clathurellidae
- Genus: Glyphostoma
- Species: G. bertinianum

Binomial name
- Glyphostoma bertinianum (Tapparone-Canefri, 1878)

Synonyms
- Clathurella bertiniana Tapparone-Canefri, 1878

Species of gastropod

Glyphostoma bertinianum is a species of sea snail, a marine gastropod mollusc in the family Clathurellidae.

== Description ==
The shell is pink outside and inside. The canaliculate sutures are often black-banded, with frequently a white central band on the body whorl, and a narrow black band below. The shell grows to a length of 12 mm.

== Distribution ==
This marine species occurs along New Guinea.
