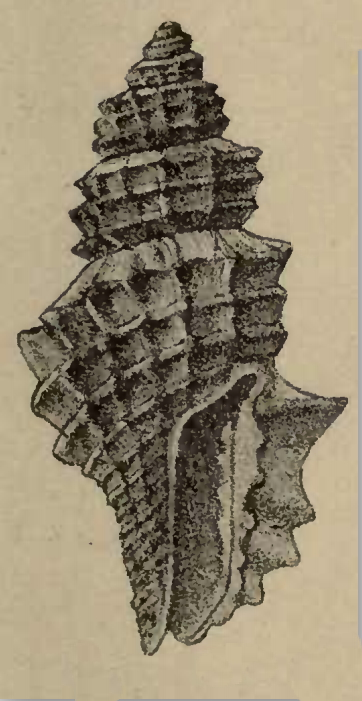
- Drawing of a shell of Heterocithara hirsuta

Scientific classification
- Kingdom: Animalia
- Phylum: Mollusca
- Class: Gastropoda
- Subclass: Caenogastropoda
- Order: Neogastropoda
- Superfamily: Conoidea
- Family: Mangeliidae
- Genus: Heterocithara
- Species: H. hirsuta

Binomial name
- Heterocithara hirsuta (de Folin, 1867)

Synonyms
- Clathurella hirsuta (De Folin, 1867); Mangilia hirsuta (De Folin, 1867); Pleurotoma hirsutum De Folin, A.G.L. 1867

= Heterocithara hirsuta =

Species of mollusc

Heterocithara hirsuta is a species of sea snail, a marine gastropod mollusk in the family Mangeliidae.

== Description ==
The length of the shell attains 3.4 mm. The shell is yellowish white, the earlier whorls darker.

== Distribution ==
This marine species is endemic to Australia and occurs off Queensland.
