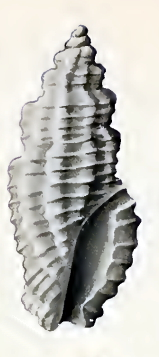
- Original image of a shell of Heterocithara transenna

Scientific classification
- Kingdom: Animalia
- Phylum: Mollusca
- Class: Gastropoda
- Subclass: Caenogastropoda
- Order: Neogastropoda
- Superfamily: Conoidea
- Family: Mangeliidae
- Genus: Heterocithara
- Species: H. transenna

Binomial name
- Heterocithara transenna Hedley, 1922

= Heterocithara transenna =

Species of mollusc

Heterocithara transenna is a species of sea snail, a marine gastropod mollusk in the family Mangeliidae.

== Description ==
The length of the shell attains 5 mm, its diameter 2 mm.

(Original description) The small, very solid shell has an ovate-acuminate shape and is turreted. Its colour is faded to a uniform gray. It contains 6 whorls. The protoconch is composed of two small smooth elevated whorls. The sculpture shows radials that are prominent perpendicular discontinuous ribs, which are dislocated at but continue on the snout;.tTey are nodose at, the passage of the spirals, and wider spaced on the body whorl, being set at the rate of ten on the penultimate whorl and eight on the body whorl. The spirals are strong evenly-spaced threads, nine on the body whorl and three on the one before. The aperture contains a broad and prominent varix, almost closing up the mouth. The sinus is open and rather shallow. The siphonal canal is a mere notch.

== Distribution ==
This marine species is endemic to Australia and occurs off Queensland.
