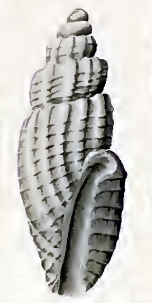
- Original image of a shell of Heterocithara rigorata

Scientific classification
- Kingdom: Animalia
- Phylum: Mollusca
- Class: Gastropoda
- Subclass: Caenogastropoda
- Order: Neogastropoda
- Superfamily: Conoidea
- Family: Mangeliidae
- Genus: Heterocithara
- Species: H. rigorata

Binomial name
- Heterocithara rigorata (Hedley, 1909)

Synonyms
- Mangelia rigorata Hedley, 1909 (original combination)

= Heterocithara rigorata =

Species of mollusc

Heterocithara rigorata is a species of sea snail, a marine gastropod mollusk in the family Mangeliidae.

== Description ==
The length of the shell attains 3.8 mm, its diameter 1.5 mm.

(Original description) The small, oblong shell is turreted and rather solid. Its colour is dull white. It contains 6 whorls, including a smooth three-whorled protoconch. whose initial whorl is eccentric. The sculpture shows from ten to twelve very prominent, close, radial ribs, widest apart on the back of the body whorl, and becoming closer on the earlier whorls. These ribs project on the summit of the whorl and fade gradually on the base. The body whorl is encircled by twelve to fourteen strong spiral cords, which override both ribs and interstices. On the penultimate whorl there are four such cords, and on the antepenultimate three. Between and parallel to the spiral cords are fine, close, microscopic hairlines. The aperture is narrow linear, with a deep sinus and a prominent varix

Some variation in contour occurs, some individuals being shorter and broader than others. The species is characterised by its straight, narrow form, gradate spire, and strongly modelled sculpture.

== Distribution ==
This marine species is endemic to Australia and occurs off Queensland.
