= Glyphostoma pilsbryi =

Scientific classification
- Kingdom: Animalia
- Phylum: Mollusca
- Class: Gastropoda
- Subclass: Caenogastropoda
- Order: Neogastropoda
- Family: Clathurellidae
- Genus: Glyphostoma
- Species: G. pilsbryi

Binomial name
- Glyphostoma pilsbryi Schwengel, 1940

Species of gastropod

Glyphostoma pilsbryi is a species of sea snail, a marine gastropod mollusc in the family Clathurellidae.

== Description ==
The size of an adult shell varies between 8 mm and 15 mm.

== Distribution ==
G. pilsbryi can be found from the eastern coast of Florida to Campeche Bank. The minimum recorded depth is 91 m. The maximum recorded depth is 183 m.
