= Glyphostoma maldivica =

Scientific classification
- Kingdom: Animalia
- Phylum: Mollusca
- Class: Gastropoda
- Subclass: Caenogastropoda
- Order: Neogastropoda
- Family: Clathurellidae
- Genus: Glyphostoma
- Species: G. maldivica

Binomial name
- Glyphostoma maldivica Sysoev, 1996

Species of gastropod

Glyphostoma maldivica, the Maldivan glyphostoma, is a species of sea snail, a marine gastropod mollusc in the family Clathurellidae.

== Distribution ==
This species occurs in the Atlantic Ocean along the Maldives.
