= Glyphostoma dentiferum =

Scientific classification
- Kingdom: Animalia
- Phylum: Mollusca
- Class: Gastropoda
- Subclass: Caenogastropoda
- Order: Neogastropoda
- Family: Clathurellidae
- Genus: Glyphostoma
- Species: G. dentiferum

Binomial name
- Glyphostoma dentiferum Gabb, 1872

Species of gastropod

Glyphostoma dentiferum is a species of sea snail, a marine gastropod mollusc in the family Clathurellidae.

== Description ==
The size of an adult shell varies between 10 mm and 32 mm.

== Distribution ==
Glyphostoma dentiferum can be found in Caribbean waters, ranging from Alabama to the Florida Keys and Panama.
