= Heterocithara laterculus =

Scientific classification
- Kingdom: Animalia
- Phylum: Mollusca
- Class: Gastropoda
- Subclass: Caenogastropoda
- Order: Neogastropoda
- Superfamily: Conoidea
- Family: Mangeliidae
- Genus: Heterocithara
- Species: H. laterculus

Binomial name
- Heterocithara laterculus Marwick, 1931

Species of mollusc

Heterocithara laterculus is an extinct species of sea snail, a marine gastropod mollusk in the family Mangeliidae.

== Distribution ==
This extinct marine species is endemic to New Zealand.
