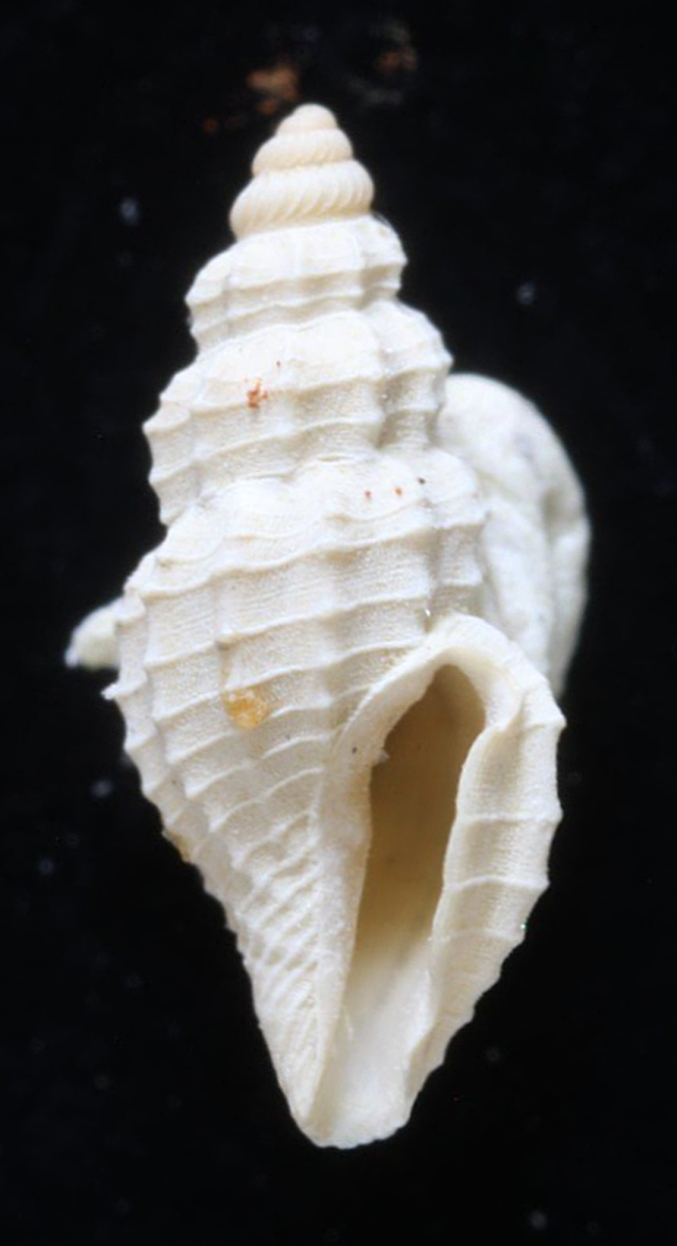
- Shell of Heterocithara mediocris (syntype at the Swedish Museum of Natural History)

Scientific classification
- Kingdom: Animalia
- Phylum: Mollusca
- Class: Gastropoda
- Subclass: Caenogastropoda
- Order: Neogastropoda
- Superfamily: Conoidea
- Family: Mangeliidae
- Genus: Heterocithara
- Species: H. mediocris

Binomial name
- Heterocithara mediocris Odhner, 1924

= Heterocithara mediocris =

Species of mollusc

Heterocithara mediocris is a species of sea snail, a marine gastropod mollusc in the family Mangeliidae.

== Taxonomy ==
The species was described by Nils Hjalmar Odhner in 1924 in his paper on New Zealand molluscs collected during Dr. Th. Mortensen's Pacific Expedition of 1914–1916. It is currently treated as an accepted species in the genus Heterocithara by MolluscaBase.

The type locality is recorded as 64 metres in the Colville Channel, Hauraki Gulf, New Zealand.

== Description ==
The shell is small, reaching about 6 mm in height and 2.5 mm in width.

(Original description) The shell is small and turreted, with a pointed apex and a spire that exceeds the aperture slightly in height. The sculpture begins with the apical whorl, which is at first smooth and then becomes spirally punctured. The next two whorls bear fine spiral striae and numerous, thin, equidistant, somewhat flexuous longitudinal costae. On the fourth and subsequent whorls, the sculpture consists of coarser, more widely spaced axial ribs and four to five spiral threads, of which the second is the strongest and forms nodules where it crosses the axial ribs. The axial costae are continuous over the entire spire and number eleven on the penultimate whorl. The body whorl carries about ten spiral lines (with one or two additional intercalated threads), and there are six to seven spirals on the siphonal canal. The interstices everywhere contain fine spirals composed of microscopic grains. The suture is rather deep, and the shell is white.

The aperture is narrow and vertical, with a deep sinus set in a broad varix, which is limited on each side by a short tooth. On the inner side of the outer lip there is one additional tooth, which may be indistinct in some specimens. The edge of the outer lip bears a few short furrows that correspond to the spiral ribs and is sinuous below. The siphonal canal is short.

== Distribution ==
This marine species is endemic to New Zealand. It has been recorded from Middlesex Bank, the Three Kings Islands, and the north-eastern and south-western parts of the North Island, at depths of 30–508 m.
