= Glyphostoma otohimeae =

Scientific classification
- Kingdom: Animalia
- Phylum: Mollusca
- Class: Gastropoda
- Subclass: Caenogastropoda
- Order: Neogastropoda
- Family: Clathurellidae
- Genus: Glyphostoma
- Species: G. otohimeae

Binomial name
- Glyphostoma otohimeae Kosuge, 1981

Species of gastropod

Glyphostoma otohimeae is a predatory species of sea snail, a benthic marine gastropod mollusk in the family Clathurellidae.

== Description ==
The size of an adult shell varies between 23 and 35 millimetres (0.91 and 1.38 in).

Like other species in the genus Glyphostoma, it is characterized by its fusiform shell shape, a long siphonal canal, a heavy outer lip, and a wrinkled inner lip.

Glyphostoma otohimeae reproduces sexually.

== Distribution ==
This species occurs in the Pacific Ocean along the Philippines.
