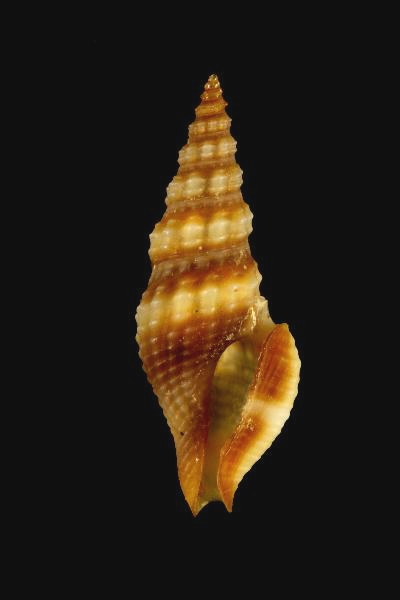
- Shells of Glyphostoma bayeri (specimen at MNHN, Paris)

Scientific classification
- Kingdom: Animalia
- Phylum: Mollusca
- Class: Gastropoda
- Subclass: Caenogastropoda
- Order: Neogastropoda
- Family: Clathurellidae
- Genus: Glyphostoma
- Species: G. bayeri

Binomial name
- Glyphostoma bayeri Olsson, 1971

= Glyphostoma bayeri =

Species of gastropod

Glyphostoma bayeri, or Bayer's turrid, is a species of sea snail, a marine gastropod mollusc in the family Clathurellidae.

== Description ==
The size of an adult shell varies between 15 mm and 33 mm.

== Distribution ==
This marine species occurs in the Gulf of Panama.
