= Glyphostoma granulifera =

Scientific classification
- Kingdom: Animalia
- Phylum: Mollusca
- Class: Gastropoda
- Subclass: Caenogastropoda
- Order: Neogastropoda
- Family: Clathurellidae
- Genus: Glyphostoma
- Species: G. granulifera

Binomial name
- Glyphostoma granulifera (Schepman, 1913)

Synonyms
- Lienardia granulifera Schepman, 1913

Species of gastropod

Glyphostoma granulifera is a species of sea snail, a marine gastropod mollusc in the family Clathurellidae.

== Distribution ==
This marine species occurs along Indonesia.
