= Glyphostoma claudoni =

Scientific classification
- Kingdom: Animalia
- Phylum: Mollusca
- Class: Gastropoda
- Subclass: Caenogastropoda
- Order: Neogastropoda
- Family: Clathurellidae
- Genus: Glyphostoma
- Species: G. claudoni

Binomial name
- Glyphostoma claudoni (Dautzenberg, 1900)

Synonyms
- Drillia claudoni Dautzenberg, 1900

Species of gastropod

Glyphostoma claudoni is a species of sea snail, a marine gastropod mollusc in the family Clathurellidae.

== Description ==
The shell grows to a length of 13 mm.

== Distribution ==
This species occurs in the Caribbean Sea along Colombia and Suriname.
