= Glyphostoma oliverai =

Scientific classification
- Kingdom: Animalia
- Phylum: Mollusca
- Class: Gastropoda
- Subclass: Caenogastropoda
- Order: Neogastropoda
- Family: Clathurellidae
- Genus: Glyphostoma
- Species: G. oliverai

Binomial name
- Glyphostoma oliverai Kilburn & Lan, 2004

Species of gastropod

Glyphostoma oliverai is a species of sea snail, a marine gastropod mollusc in the family Clathurellidae.
