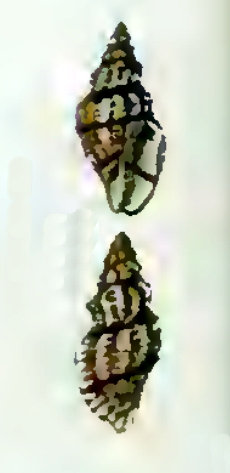
- Original image of a shell of Heterocithara bilineata

Scientific classification
- Kingdom: Animalia
- Phylum: Mollusca
- Class: Gastropoda
- Subclass: Caenogastropoda
- Order: Neogastropoda
- Superfamily: Conoidea
- Family: Mangeliidae
- Genus: Heterocithara
- Species: H. bilineata

Binomial name
- Heterocithara bilineata (Angas, 1871)

Synonyms
- Clathurella bilineata Angas, 1871 (original combination); Mangilia bilineata (Angas, 1871)

= Heterocithara bilineata =

Species of mollusc

Heterocithara bilineata is a species of sea snail, a marine gastropod mollusk in the family Mangeliidae.

== Description ==
(Original description) The shell is ovately turreted, moderately solid, pale straw-colour or light brown, nearly white around the aperture and at the base, with a narrow brown band just below the suture, and a second between the periphery and the base of the body whorl. The shell contains 6 whorls, angulate at the upper part, coarsely longitudinally ribbed and transversely ridged. The interstices are very finely decussately striated. The aperture is acuminately ovate. The outer lip is arcuate, contracted towards the base, and thickened behind. The posterior sinus is very shallow.

== Distribution ==
This marine species is endemic to Australia and occurs off New South Wales and Victoria.
