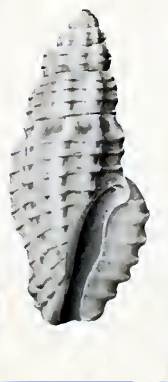
- Original image of a shell of Heterocithara erismata

Scientific classification
- Kingdom: Animalia
- Phylum: Mollusca
- Class: Gastropoda
- Subclass: Caenogastropoda
- Order: Neogastropoda
- Superfamily: Conoidea
- Family: Mangeliidae
- Genus: Heterocithara
- Species: H. erismata

Binomial name
- Heterocithara erismata Hedley, 1922

= Heterocithara erismata =

Species of mollusc

Heterocithara erismata is a species of sea snail, a marine gastropod mollusk in the family Mangeliidae.

== Description ==
The length of the shell varies between 4 mm and 7.5 mm.

(Original description) The very solid shell has an ovate-elliptical shape. Its colour is pale cream, spotted with square dots of raw sienna upon the ribs between the spirals. It contains 6 whorls, plus the protoconch. The surface of the shell is rather glossy, with fine radial microscopic scratches. The radials are prominent, close-set, discontinuous ribs, wider spaced on the back of the body whorl, amounting to nine on the penultimate. The spirals are chiefly apparent as beads upon the ribs, but suddenly enlarge upon the snout to massive tubercles. On the body whorl there are nine, on the penultimate three, and on the antepenultimate two. The aperture is narrow and vertical . The varix is prominent, the spirals that cross it are magnified into seven outstanding knuckles. The sinus is a deep U-shaped incision in the varix. The siphonal canal is very short. No plications or denticules within the outer lip or on the columella.

== Distribution ==
This marine species is occurs off Hawaii, Réunion and Australia (Queensland).
