= Glyphostoma thalassoma =

Scientific classification
- Kingdom: Animalia
- Phylum: Mollusca
- Class: Gastropoda
- Subclass: Caenogastropoda
- Order: Neogastropoda
- Family: Clathurellidae
- Genus: Glyphostoma
- Species: G. thalassoma

Binomial name
- Glyphostoma thalassoma Dall, 1908

Species of gastropod

Glyphostoma thalassoma is a species of sea snail, a marine gastropod mollusc in the family Clathurellidae.

== Description ==
The shell grows to a length of 20 mm.

== Distribution ==
This species occurs in the Gulf of California, Western Mexico.
