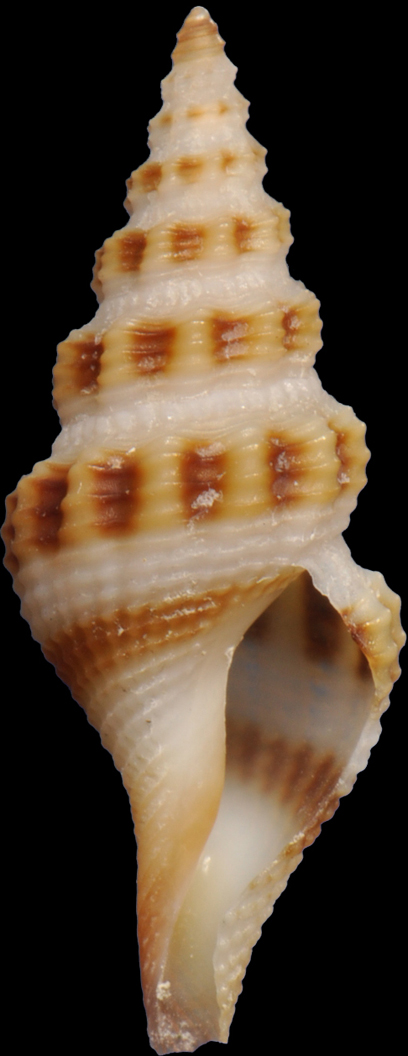

Scientific classification
- Kingdom: Animalia
- Phylum: Mollusca
- Class: Gastropoda
- Subclass: Caenogastropoda
- Order: Neogastropoda
- Family: Clathurellidae
- Genus: Glyphostoma
- Species: G. leucum

Binomial name
- Glyphostoma leucum (K.J. Bush, 1893)

Synonyms
- Mangelia leuca Bush, 1893; Mangilia leuca Bush, 1893

= Glyphostoma leucum =

Species of marine gastropods

Glyphostoma leucum, the white glyphostoma, is a species of sea snail, a marine gastropod mollusc in the family Clathurellidae.

== Description ==
The length of the shell attains 15 mm, its diameter 6 mm.

(Original description as Mangelia leuca) The shell is rather large for the genus, regularly fusiform, thin and translucent. It is bluish white, with a roughened surface of waxy lustre, and a shining tip of a delicate yellow tint. The spire measures about half the length of the shell. It consists of seven decidedly shouldered whorls, besides the protoconch. The aperture is long and narrow. The posterior sinus is large and nearly round, commencing at the suture and reaching to the shoulder, cutting into the top of the varlx formed by the thickening of the last transverse rib. It thus shows a thickened border with the upper edge rounded but not raised above the surface of the shell, extending farther back than the inner edge and curving strongly with the lines of growth, nearly meeting in front. From this the thin outer lip reaches far forward over the aperture, leaving a very narrow opening. Near the anterior end it is pinched in slightly, then bends abruptly backward as though cut off obliquely, revealing the entire width of the siphonal canal, and, curving a little upward, forms a slight notch before joining the columella. The edge of the lip is rounded and crimped by the termination of the revolving threads. The columella has a slight sigmoid curvature and an inconspicuous layer of enamel. The suture is distinct, undulating, slightly channelled. The concave subsutural band occupies about a third of the width of the upper whorls, and is crossed by fine indistinct lines of growth. Conspicuous, rather broad, angular, oblique ribs cross the whorls, scarcely evident on the subsutural band, but rise somewhat abruptly on its lower edge, forming a sharp shoulder at the periphery. There are eleven of these ribs on the body whorl, reaching to the base of the siphonal canal. These, with their equally broad, concave interspaces, are ornamented with about twenty-five conspicuously raised, uniform, rounded threads, pretty regularly separated, but a little crowded on the anterior end of the siphonal canal. On the penultimate whorl there are six of them, the first just above the shoulder and the last just above the suture. The lines of growth are very indistinct. The protoconch is small, shining, consisting of three and a half regularly coiled whorls, the lower one ornamented with a peripheral keel. The entire surface of the shell is covered with minute granules, closely crowded except on the protoconch, where they are somewhat scattered and discernible only under a high magnifying power.

Glyphostoma leucum was originally described as Mangelia leuca by Katherine J. Bush in 1893. The species was discovered from a single living specimen collected at Station 329, off Cape Lookout, North Carolina, at a depth of 603 fathoms (approximately 1,103 meters) during deep-sea operations conducted the U.S. Coast Survey Steamer Blake.

Bush described the shell as relatively large for the genus Mangelia, with a slender, regularly fusiform shape, thin and translucent bluish-white in color and possessing a rough, waxy surface with a shiny, delicately yellow-tinted tip. The shell measured approximately 15 mm in length and 6 mm in width, with an aperture about 7 mm long.

Distinctive morphological features included a spire comprising seven shouldered whorls, in addition to a nucleus of three and a half coiled whorls, a large and nearly round posterior sinus, a thin outer lip curving forward over a narrow aperture and an anterior canal that revealed the full width of the siphonal notch. The shell was ornamented with broad, oblique ribs and uniformly raised spiral threads, along with microscopic granulation over its surface.

The species remains notable for its deep-sea origin, elegant shell structure and unique combination of taxonomic features which according to Bush's original remarks bore no close resemblance to any previously described species.

== Distribution ==
This species is distributed across the East Coast of the U.S. and the Caribbean.

== Habitat ==
Glyphostoma leucum is demersal, known only from its type locality off Cape Lookout, North Carolina (western North Atlantic). The single specimen was dredged by the U.S. Coast‑Survey steamer Blake situating the species on the upper bathyal portion of the continental slope, at that depth the seafloor is in permanent darkness, under temperatures of about 4–6 °C and high hydrostatic pressure. The bottom at the Blake station was recorded as fine, soft mud, indicating that Glyphostoma leucum inhabits a silty, low‑energy substrate typical of slope environments.

Within this habitat the snail is presumed to live as a small predator or scavenger, moving on or slightly within the sediment to hunt minute invertebrates or exploit detrital material. No additional confirmed collections have been made, so its bathymetric range appears to be narrowly centred on ~1100 m.

== Etymology ==
The epithet leucum is derived from the Greek word leukos (λευκός), meaning “white.” It has been Latinized to match the neuter gender of the genus Glyphostoma, forming the neuter nominative singular leucum.

The name refers to the species’ pure white shell as described by Katharine J. Bush in 1909.

== Taxonomy ==
Glyphostoma leucum was originally classified in Mangelia, which was first described by Antonio Risso in 1826, making it an older genus name, the genus Glyphostoma was introduced later, by William Gabb in 1873 and despite the fact that it had already been established, it was not yet clearly defined or widely accepted as a distinct genus by all malacologists.

In the late 19th century, taxonomic boundaries within the family Turridae, as it was then broadly defined, were still unsuccessfully resolved. Many genera, including Glyphostoma and species were often placed into Mangelia due to its broad and ambiguous definition.

Systematic revisions of the Conoidea superfamily in the late 20th and early 21st centuries lead to the shifting of the species, from the family Turridae to Clathurellidae, implying the phylogenetic relationships. These changes were formalized in recent databases like MolluscaBase and WoRMS, which now recognize Glyphostoma leucum as the valid name within Clathurellidae.

Taxonomic revisions led to its reassignment to the genus Glyphostoma, based on morphological distinctions such as shell sculpture, sinus formation and aperture structure, which better aligned with the characteristics of the given genus. As a result, the species epithet was modified from leuca to leucum to conform with the neuter gender of the genus name Glyphostoma.
