= Glyphostoma coronaseminale =

Scientific classification
- Kingdom: Animalia
- Phylum: Mollusca
- Class: Gastropoda
- Subclass: Caenogastropoda
- Order: Neogastropoda
- Family: Clathurellidae
- Genus: Glyphostoma
- Species: G. coronaseminale

Binomial name
- Glyphostoma coronaseminale E. F. García, 2015

Species of sea snail

The holotype was collected at depths of -352 to -361 meters underwater

Glyphostoma coronaseminale is a species of sea snail, a marine gastropod mollusc in the family Clathurellidae.

== Discovery ==
Glyphostoma coronaseminale was described by Emilio F. García in 2015, based on specimens collected during research expeditions conducted by the University of Louisiana at Lafayette. The species was discovered during a September 2014 cruise that terminated west of the Dry Tortugas, Florida, representing the final expedition of five cruisers executed under the Gulf of Mexico Research Initiative (GoMRI).

== Description ==
The shell is spiral, slender, solid and fusiform, reaching a maximum length of 23.2 mm and a width of 8.8 mm in the holotype, with a length-to-width ratio of 2.64. The coloration is white marked by two pale-yellow spiral bands; one located at the shoulder of the apical whorls and another in a sub-peripheral position on the body whorl.

The protoconch comprises 3¼ smooth yellowish whorls. The initial whorl is minute and translucent, followed by whorls bearing a submedial keel and a secondary, less prominent keel near the suture.

The teleoconch consists of 7½ convex whorls, each with a subsutural constriction forming a distinct shoulder. The sutures are strongly impressed in early whorls, while the later ones are narrowly channeled and show crenulations caused by the prominent nodes of the anal fasciole which is constricted and ornamented with approximately 30 spirally elongated and well-defined nodules on the body whorl.

The axial sculpture is composed of stout, backward-slanting (opisthocline) ribs, increasing in number from 10 on the first whorl to 24 on the last. These ribs extend nearly to the base of the anterior canal.

The spiral sculpture includes strong cords intersecting the axial ribs, forming nodules at the points of intersection. Three primary peripheral cords are present, with up to six additional cords visible on the penultimate whorl.

The aperture is narrow and elongate measuring 12.2 mm in the holotype. The outer lip is reinforced by a thick concave varix terminating in a deep U-shaped sinus. This varix is crossed by 18 spiral cords and is axially incised to form a secondary labrum. A third thinner labral ridge projects beyond the previous two and bears bifurcate denticles.

The inner lip features eight strong denticles with the posterior one enlarged and callused near the sinus. The parietal wall bears a nodose callus at the entrance to the sinus (a small posterior denticle), two prominent plaits extending into the aperture, a bifurcate anterior denticle and a row of diminishing nodules.

== Specimen ==
The holotype USNM 1274997 is deposited in the National Museum of Natural History, Smithsonian Institution. A paratype USNM 1274998 measuring 17.2 mm in length and 7.1 mm in width is also housed in the same collection.

== Etymology ==
The epithet coronaseminale is a compound word derived from Latin corona (crown) and seminale (seeds) meaning "crown of seeds", referring to the characteristic spiral row of nodules present at the anal fasciole. The name describes the crown like appearance of the seed-shaped nodules that distinguish this species.

== Distribution ==
Glyphostoma coronaseminale occurs in the southwestern Gulf of Mexico; from southwest of Key West to west of the Dry Tortugas, southern Florida.

== Habitat ==
The habitat consists of sandy bottoms with broken shells where the species was found alongside other deep-water mollusks like Bathytoma viabrunnea and Bartschia frumari. The species inhabits relatively deep waters ranging from 84 to 361 meters in depth.
