= Glyphostoma supraplicatum =

Scientific classification
- Kingdom: Animalia
- Phylum: Mollusca
- Class: Gastropoda
- Subclass: Caenogastropoda
- Order: Neogastropoda
- Family: Clathurellidae
- Genus: Glyphostoma
- Species: G. supraplicatum

Binomial name
- Glyphostoma supraplicatum Sysoev, 1996

Species of gastropod

Glyphostoma supraplicatum is a species of deep-sea marine snail in the family Clathurellidae.

== Taxonomy ==
The earliest known specimen of G. supraplicatum was collected among a wealth of other animal and plant specimens as part of a 1933-34 expedition of the Indian Ocean. While the specimen was collected at that time, it took until 1996 for the collection of gastropod specimens to be analysed and G. supraplicatum to be described as a species.

== Description ==
Description of G. supraplicatum is based on the observation of six shells; as such, physical features outside the shell are unknown. The shell of G. supraplicatum is small and slender and consists of a protoconch and seven teleoconch whorls.

== Distribution ==
The species occurs in populations in the Gulf of Aden at depths ranging from 655 to 732 meters below sea level.
