= Glyphostoma myrae =

Scientific classification
- Kingdom: Animalia
- Phylum: Mollusca
- Class: Gastropoda
- Subclass: Caenogastropoda
- Order: Neogastropoda
- Family: Clathurellidae
- Genus: Glyphostoma
- Species: G. myrae

Binomial name
- Glyphostoma myrae Shasky, 1971

Species of gastropod

Glyphostoma myrae is a species of sea snail, a marine gastropod mollusc in the family Clathurellidae,.

== Distribution ==
This species occurs in the Pacific Ocean along Panama.
