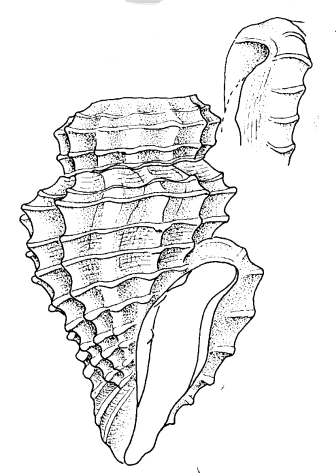
- Original drawing of a shell of Heterocithara sibogae (holotype)

Scientific classification
- Kingdom: Animalia
- Phylum: Mollusca
- Class: Gastropoda
- Subclass: Caenogastropoda
- Order: Neogastropoda
- Superfamily: Conoidea
- Family: Mangeliidae
- Genus: Heterocithara
- Species: H. sibogae

Binomial name
- Heterocithara sibogae Shuto, 1970

Synonyms
- Mangilia halmaherica Schepman, 1913 (partim)

= Heterocithara sibogae =

Species of mollusc

Heterocithara sibogae is a species of sea snail, a marine gastropod mollusk in the family Mangeliidae.

== Description ==
The length of the shell attains 7.6 mm, its diameter 4.7 mm.

(Original description)The shell is biconical and quite similar to Guraleus halmahericus (Schepman, 1913), except for more obscure basal contraction and shorter snout. The protoconch has been eroded and the detailed features are not known. The sculpture of the teleoconch is quite different from G. halmahericus. The axials are much sharper, still strong on the anal band to reach the upper suture, and extend to the upper part of the snout. The spirals do not form the granules but are on]y crenulated on the axials. The subsutural lira is obsolete. The spirals on the snout are few in number. The aperture is provided with varix outside the outer lip and three denticles at the upper part of the inner lip.

== Distribution ==
This marine species occurs off Indonesia.
