= Glyphostoma pustulosa =

Scientific classification
- Kingdom: Animalia
- Phylum: Mollusca
- Class: Gastropoda
- Subclass: Caenogastropoda
- Order: Neogastropoda
- Family: Clathurellidae
- Genus: Glyphostoma
- Species: G. pustulosa

Binomial name
- Glyphostoma pustulosa McLean & Poorman, 1971

Synonyms
- Glyphostoma (Glyphostoma) pustulosa McLean, J.H. & R. Poorman, 1971

Species of gastropod

Glyphostoma pustulosa is a species of sea snail, a marine gastropod mollusc in the family Clathurellidae.

== Description ==
The shell grows to a length of 12 mm.

== Distribution ==
This species occurs in the Pacific Ocean along the Galápagos Islands and Cocos Island, Costa Rica.
