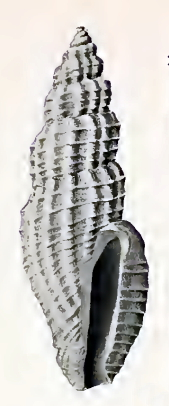
- Original image of a shell of Heterocithara seriliola

Scientific classification
- Kingdom: Animalia
- Phylum: Mollusca
- Class: Gastropoda
- Subclass: Caenogastropoda
- Order: Neogastropoda
- Superfamily: Conoidea
- Family: Mangeliidae
- Genus: Heterocithara
- Species: H. seriliola

Binomial name
- Heterocithara seriliola Hedley, 1922

= Heterocithara seriliola =

Species of mollusc

Heterocithara seriliola is a species of sea snail, a marine gastropod mollusk in the family Mangeliidae.

== Description ==
The length of the shell attains 9 mm, its diameter 3 mm.

(Original description) The subcylindrical shell is turreted with a pointed apex. Its colour is whitish. It contains 8 whorls. The ribs are narrow, elevated, round-backed, alternating from whorl to whorl, in-bent at the summit, the shaft perpendicular and the base out-curved, thirteen on the penultimate and eleven on the body whorl. The rib before the varix is evanescent. The spirals are prominent cords crossing both ribs and interspaces, on the upper whorls three or four, on the last twelve. The uppermost spiral accentuates the shoulder angle. Two or three on the base are thicker than the rest. The interspaces have microscopic grains set in canvas pattern. The aperture is long, narrow, and unarmed. The varix is larger than the ribs, rising at the insertion, the edge of its outer limb crenulated by spirals. The sinus is rather broad. The columella is perpendicular. The siphonal canal is short and broad.

== Distribution ==
This marine species occurs off Australia, (Queensland), New Caledonia and Taiwan
