= Glyphostoma phalera =

Scientific classification
- Kingdom: Animalia
- Phylum: Mollusca
- Class: Gastropoda
- Subclass: Caenogastropoda
- Order: Neogastropoda
- Family: Clathurellidae
- Genus: Glyphostoma
- Species: G. phalera

Binomial name
- Glyphostoma phalera (Dall, 1889)

Synonyms
- Mangilia phalera Dall, 1889

Species of gastropod

Glyphostoma phalera is a species of sea snail, a marine gastropod mollusc in the family Clathurellidae.

== Description ==
The size of an adult shell varies between 12.5 mm and 44 mm.

Their functional type is benthos.

Their feeding type is predatory.

== Distribution ==
This species occurs in the Caribbean Sea and the Lesser Antilles.
