= Glyphostoma golfoyaquense =

Scientific classification
- Kingdom: Animalia
- Phylum: Mollusca
- Class: Gastropoda
- Subclass: Caenogastropoda
- Order: Neogastropoda
- Family: Clathurellidae
- Genus: Glyphostoma
- Species: G. golfoyaquense

Binomial name
- Glyphostoma golfoyaquense Maury, 1917

Species of gastropod

Glyphostoma golfoyaquense, the Yucateco glyphostoma, is a species of sea snail, a marine gastropod mollusc in the family Clathurellidae.

== Description ==
This species occurs in the Gulf of Mexico from West Florida to Yucatan, Mexico.

== Distribution ==
Glyphostoma golfoyaquense can be found in Caribbean waters, ranging from western Florida to the Yucatan.
