= Glyphostoma polynesiensis =

Scientific classification
- Kingdom: Animalia
- Phylum: Mollusca
- Class: Gastropoda
- Subclass: Caenogastropoda
- Order: Neogastropoda
- Family: Clathurellidae
- Genus: Glyphostoma
- Species: G. polynesiensis

Binomial name
- Glyphostoma polynesiensis (Reeve, 1845)

Synonyms
- Clathurella polynesiensis Reeve, 1845; Lienardia polynesiensis (Reeve, 1845); Pleurotoma polynesiensis Reeve, 1845

Species of gastropod

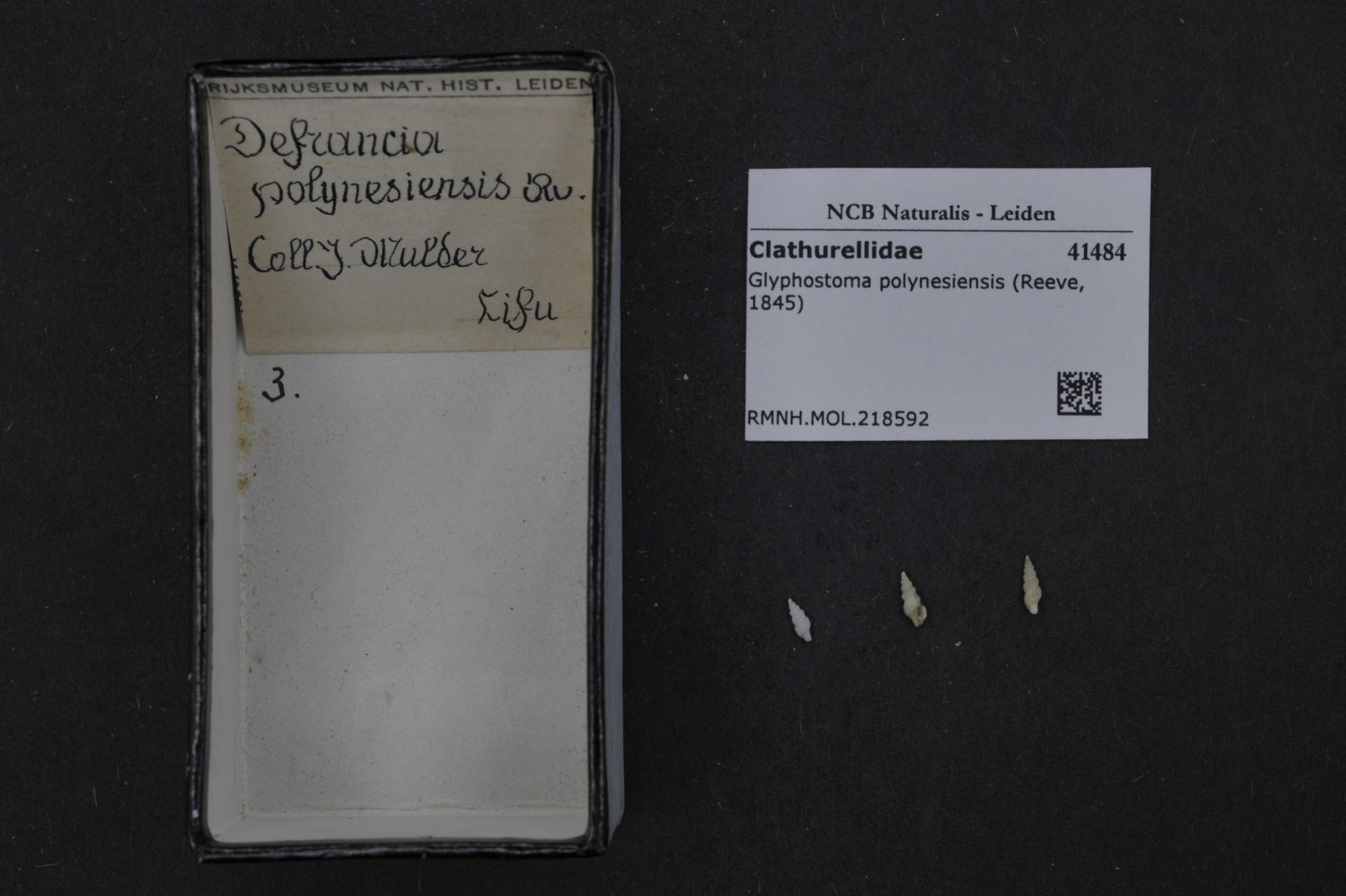

Glyphostoma polynesiensis, the Polynesian glyphostoma, is a species of sea snail, a marine gastropod mollusc in the family Clathurellidae.

== Description ==
The whorls are narrowly obtusely shouldered, longitudinally closely ribbed, transversely striated. The outer lip is thickened. The anal sinus is large. The color of the shell is white.

== Distribution ==
This marine species occurs along Lord Hood Island in Western Australia.
