= Glyphostoma hervieri =

Scientific classification
- Kingdom: Animalia
- Phylum: Mollusca
- Class: Gastropoda
- Subclass: Caenogastropoda
- Order: Neogastropoda
- Family: Clathurellidae
- Genus: Glyphostoma
- Species: G. hervieri

Binomial name
- Glyphostoma hervieri Dautzenberg, 1932

Species of gastropod

Glyphostoma hervieri is a species of sea snail, a marine gastropod mollusc in the family Clathurellidae.

== Distribution ==
This species occurs in the Indian Ocean along Madagascar.
