= Glyphostoma elsae =

Scientific classification
- Kingdom: Animalia
- Phylum: Mollusca
- Class: Gastropoda
- Subclass: Caenogastropoda
- Order: Neogastropoda
- Family: Clathurellidae
- Genus: Glyphostoma
- Species: G. elsae

Binomial name
- Glyphostoma elsae Bartsch, 1934

Species of gastropod

Glyphostoma elsae is a species of sea snail, a marine gastropod mollusc in the family Clathurellidae.

== Distribution ==
Glyphostoma elsae can be found in Caribbean waters, ranging from Gulf of Mexico to Puerto Rico.
