= Glyphostoma scobina =

Scientific classification
- Kingdom: Animalia
- Phylum: Mollusca
- Class: Gastropoda
- Subclass: Caenogastropoda
- Order: Neogastropoda
- Family: Clathurellidae
- Genus: Glyphostoma
- Species: G. scobina

Binomial name
- Glyphostoma scobina McLean & Poorman, 1971

Species of gastropod

Glyphostoma scobina is a species of sea snail, a marine gastropod mollusc in the family Clathurellidae.

== Distribution ==
This species occurs in the Pacific Ocean along the Galápagos Islands and Isla Gorgona, Colombia.
