= Glyphostoma cara =

Scientific classification
- Kingdom: Animalia
- Phylum: Mollusca
- Class: Gastropoda
- Subclass: Caenogastropoda
- Order: Neogastropoda
- Family: Clathurellidae
- Genus: Glyphostoma
- Species: G. cara

Binomial name
- Glyphostoma cara (Thiele, 1925)

Synonyms
- Bellardiella cara Thiele, 1925

Species of gastropod

Glyphostoma cara is a species of sea snail, a marine gastropod mollusc in the family Clathurellidae.

== Distribution ==
This marine species occurs along Sumatra.
