= Glyphostoma lyuhrurngae =

Scientific classification
- Kingdom: Animalia
- Phylum: Mollusca
- Class: Gastropoda
- Subclass: Caenogastropoda
- Order: Neogastropoda
- Family: Clathurellidae
- Genus: Glyphostoma
- Species: G. lyuhrurngae

Binomial name
- Glyphostoma lyuhrurngae Lai, 2005

Species of gastropod

Glyphostoma lyuhrurngae is a species of sea snail, a marine gastropod mollusc in the family Clathurellidae.

== Description ==
The size of an adult shell varies between 17 mm and 25 mm. The Glyphostoma lyuhrurngae is a predator of the Benthos functional group.

== Distribution ==
This species occurs in the East China Sea and in the Pacific Ocean along the Philippines.
