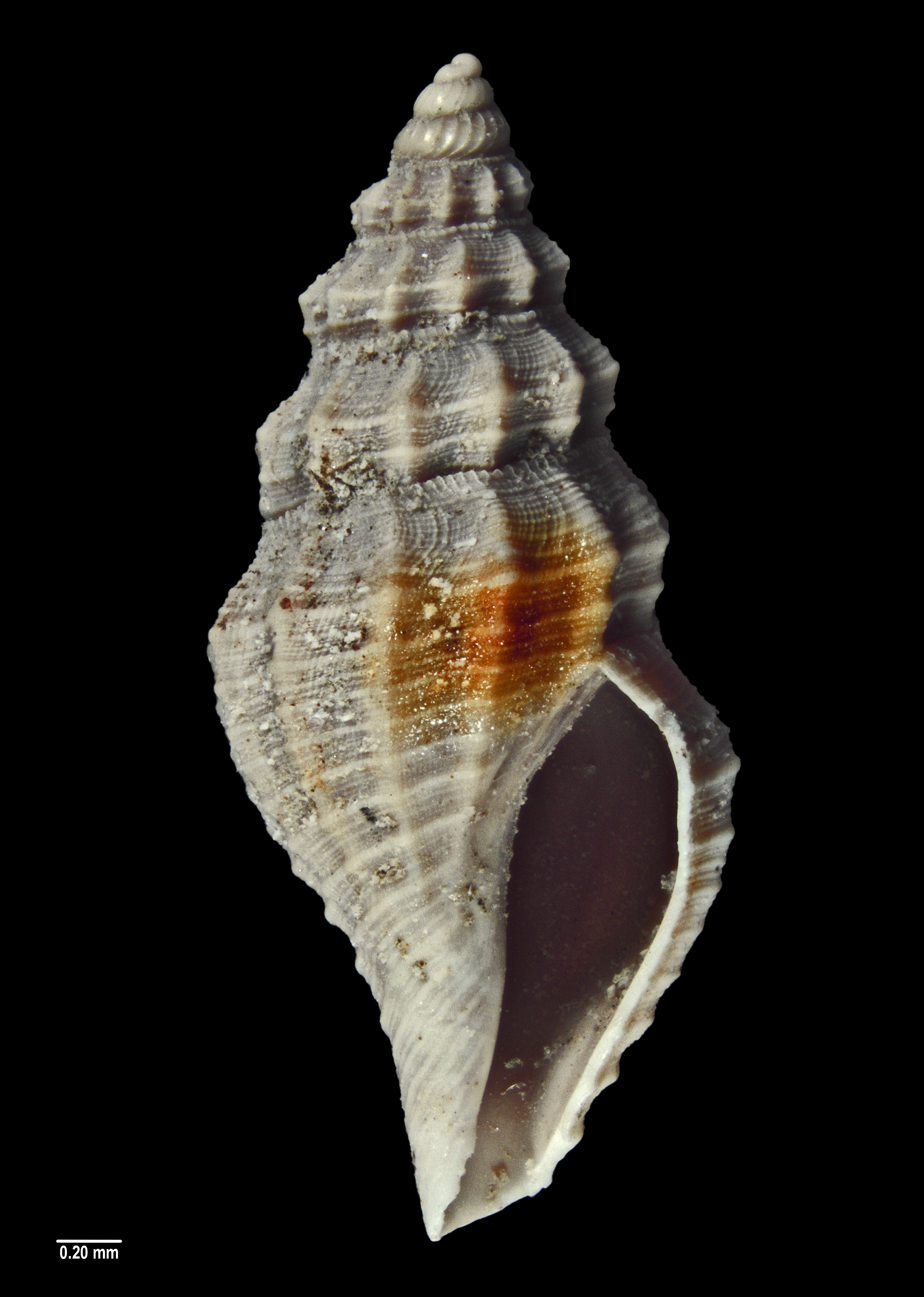
- Holotype from Auckland War Memorial Museum

Scientific classification
- Kingdom: Animalia
- Phylum: Mollusca
- Class: Gastropoda
- Subclass: Caenogastropoda
- Order: Neogastropoda
- Family: Mangeliidae
- Genus: Heterocithara
- Species: †H. miocenica

Binomial name
- †Heterocithara miocenica A. W. B. Powell, 1944

= Heterocithara miocenica =

Heterocithara miocenica Temporal range: middle Miocene

Extinct species of gastropod

Heterocithara miocenica is an extinct species of sea snail, a marine gastropod mollusc in the family Mangeliidae. Fossils of the species date to the middle Miocene, and occurs in the strata of the Port Phillip Basin of Victoria, Australia.

== Description ==
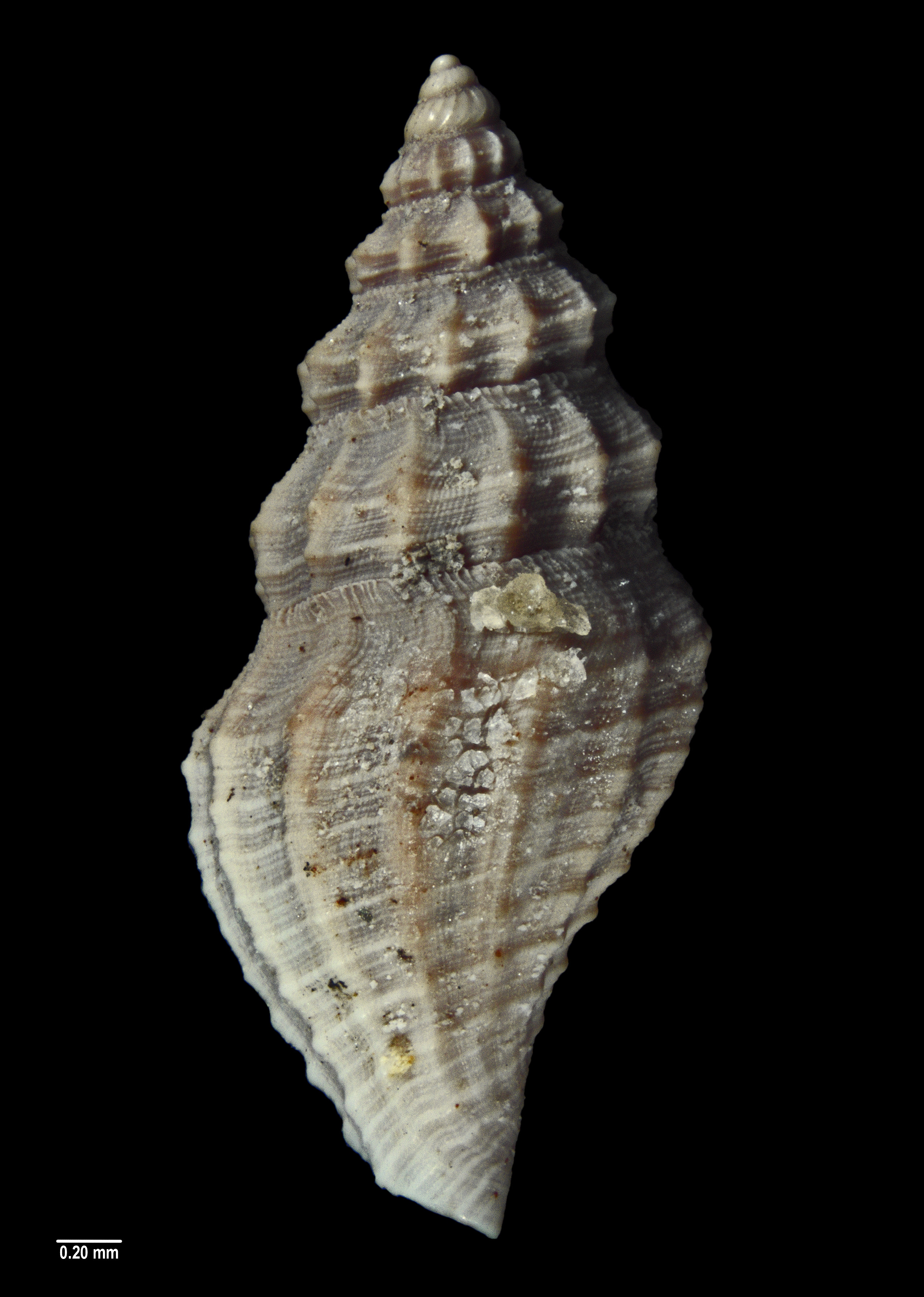
Reverse view of holotype

In the original description, Powell described the species as follows:

Short fusiform-biconic; spire turreted; angle just below middle. Sculptured with narrowly-crested axial folds, extending from upper suture to over base, but not on the anterior end, 12 per whorl; crossed by narrow, widely-spaced spiral cords and a dense surface pattern of fine lirations, which are rendered granular by still finer and closer axial threads. There are three primary spirals on the spire-horls, upper-most at the periphery, lowest half immersed at the lower suture, and eight primary spirals on the body-whorl. Protoconch polygyrate, conic, of 34 whorls, with small, smooth tip, everted and inrolled; remaining whorls with obliquely curved, sharp axials. Adult apertural features unknown, as both available specimens are immature.

The holotype of the species measures 7.9 mm (0.31 in) in height and 3.5 mm (0.14 in) in diameter.

== Taxonomy ==
The species was first described by A.W.B. Powell in 1944. The holotype was collected from Balcombe Bay, Mornington, Victoria at an unknown date prior to 1944, and is held by the Auckland War Memorial Museum.

== Distribution ==
This extinct marine species dates to the middle Miocene, and occurs in the strata of the Port Phillip Basin of Victoria, Australia, from the Gellibrand Formation.
