= Glyphostoma immaculatum =

Scientific classification
- Kingdom: Animalia
- Phylum: Mollusca
- Class: Gastropoda
- Subclass: Caenogastropoda
- Order: Neogastropoda
- Family: Clathurellidae
- Genus: Glyphostoma
- Species: G. immaculatum

Binomial name
- Glyphostoma immaculatum Dall, 1908

Synonyms
- Glyphostoma (Euglyphostoma) immaculata (Dall, W.H., 1908); Glyphostoma immaculata Dall, 1908

Species of mollusc

Glyphostoma immaculatum is a species of sea snail, a marine gastropod mollusc in the family Clathurellidae.

== Distribution ==
This species occurs in the Gulf of Panama.
