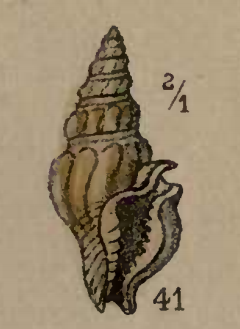
- Drawing of Glyphostoma candidum

Scientific classification
- Kingdom: Animalia
- Phylum: Mollusca
- Class: Gastropoda
- Subclass: Caenogastropoda
- Order: Neogastropoda
- Family: Clathurellidae
- Genus: Glyphostoma
- Species: G. candidum

Binomial name
- Glyphostoma candidum (Hinds, 1843)

Synonyms
- Clavatula candida Hinds, 1843

= Glyphostoma candidum =

Species of gastropod

Glyphostoma candidum is a species of sea snail, a marine gastropod mollusc in the family Clathurellidae.

== Description ==
The size of an adult shell varies between 10 mm and 14 mm. The ribs are rather broad and rounded. The revolving striae are only white at the base.

== Distribution ==
This species occurs in the Pacific Ocean along Panama.
