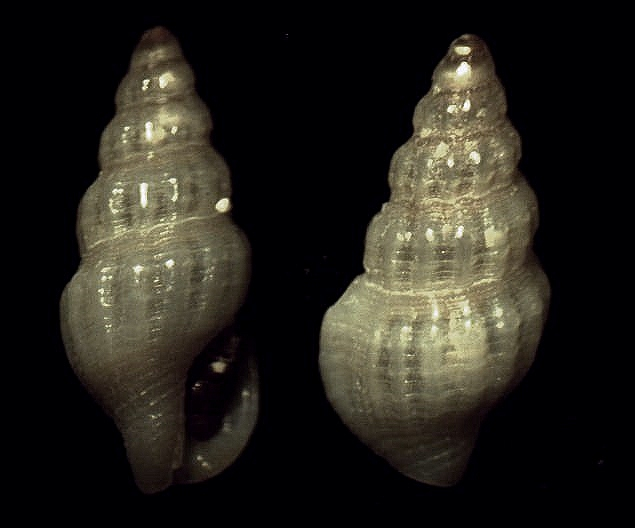

Scientific classification
- Kingdom: Animalia
- Phylum: Mollusca
- Class: Gastropoda
- Subclass: Caenogastropoda
- Order: Neogastropoda
- Family: Clathurellidae
- Genus: Etrema
- Species: E. alliterata

Binomial name
- Etrema alliterata (Hedley, 1915)

Synonyms
- Etrema (Etrema) alliterata (Hedley, 1915); Glyphostoma alliteratum Hedley, 1915

= Etrema alliterata =

Species of gastropod

Etrema alliterata is a species of sea snail, a marine gastropod mollusc in the family Clathurellidae.

== Description ==
The shell grows to a length of 5 mm.

== Distribution ==
This marine species is distributed along the Gulf of Carpentaria, Queensland, the Great Barrier Reef, New South Wales.
