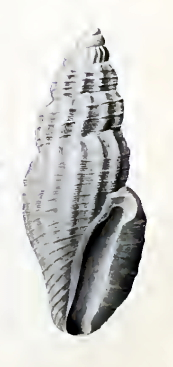
- Original image of a shell of Heterocithara concinna

Scientific classification
- Kingdom: Animalia
- Phylum: Mollusca
- Class: Gastropoda
- Subclass: Caenogastropoda
- Order: Neogastropoda
- Superfamily: Conoidea
- Family: Mangeliidae
- Genus: Heterocithara
- Species: H. concinna

Binomial name
- Heterocithara concinna Hedley, 1922

= Heterocithara concinna =

Species of mollusc

Heterocithara concinna is a species of sea snail, a marine gastropod mollusk in the family Mangeliidae.

== Description ==
The length of the shell attains 5 mm, its diameter 1.5 mm.

(Original description) The shell is small, slender and cylindro-fusiform. Its colour is pale buff, with a few broken ferruginous lines on the back of the body whorl, on the varix, and in the subsutural intercostal spaces. The shell contains 7 whorls, rounded, constricted at the suture, and subangled at the shoulder. The protoconch contains 2½ whorls, smooth, symmetrical, andconical. The sculpture shows prominent, narrow ribs, as broad as their interstices, proceeding from suture to base, but discontinuous from whorl to whorl. The spirals are sharp widely spaced threads traversing both ribs and interstices, but more conspicuous in the latter, amounting to four on the penultimate and thirteen on the body whorl, the one on the shoulder being more important than the rest. Besides the major spiral other close and minute threads overrun the fasciole area. The aperture is wide and unarmed. The varix is narrow but elevated. The sinus is deeply excavate. The siphonal canal is short and wide.

== Distribution ==
This marine species is endemic to Australia and occurs off Queensland.
