= Heterocithara tribulationis =

Scientific classification
- Kingdom: Animalia
- Phylum: Mollusca
- Class: Gastropoda
- Subclass: Caenogastropoda
- Order: Neogastropoda
- Superfamily: Conoidea
- Family: Mangeliidae
- Genus: Heterocithara
- Species: H. tribulationis

Binomial name
- Heterocithara tribulationis (Hedley, 1909)

Synonyms
- Glyphostoma tribulationis Hedley, 1909 (original combination)

Species of mollusc

Heterocithara tribulationis is a species of sea snail, a marine gastropod mollusk in the family Mangeliidae.

== Description ==
The length of the shell attains 4.75 mm, its diameter 2.5 mm.

(Original description) The small, solid shell has a biconical shape and is angled at the periphery. Its colour is white or buff. It contains 6 whorls, including a small smooth two-whorled protoconch. The sculpture shows about a dozen undulatory radial ribs, equal in breadth to their rounded interstices. They arise at the suture and are most prominent on the shoulder, and fade on the base. Ascending the spire, these radials gradually diminish. About twelve small spiral threads, which traverse ribs and furrows alike, are evenly distributed between the shoulder and the anterior extremity. Finally, a secondary sculpture of fine close grains, arranged radially and spirally, is spread over the whole surface, giving a *'gritty" aspect to the shell. The aperture is narrow, protected by a strong projecting varix. The outer lip shows two or three ill-defined tubercles within. The siphonal canal is short.

The strong shoulder angle and sanded surface are the principal features.

== Distribution ==
This marine species is endemic to Australia and occurs off Queensland.
