= Gibberula candida =

Scientific classification
- Kingdom: Animalia
- Phylum: Mollusca
- Class: Gastropoda
- Subclass: Caenogastropoda
- Order: Neogastropoda
- Family: Cystiscidae
- Subfamily: Cystiscinae
- Genus: Gibberula
- Species: G. candida

Binomial name
- Gibberula candida Cossignani, 2008

Species of gastropod

Gibberula candida is a species of very small sea snail, a marine gastropod mollusc or micromollusc in the family Cystiscidae.
