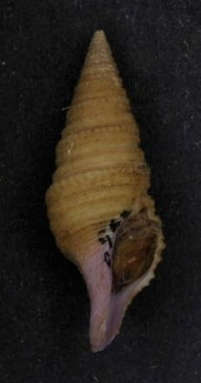
- Shell of Daphnella concinna (specimen at Naturalis Biodiversity Center)

Scientific classification
- Kingdom: Animalia
- Phylum: Mollusca
- Class: Gastropoda
- Subclass: Caenogastropoda
- Order: Neogastropoda
- Superfamily: Conoidea
- Family: Raphitomidae
- Genus: Daphnella
- Species: D. concinna

Binomial name
- Daphnella concinna (Dunker, 1857)

Synonyms
- Daphnella (Hemidaphne) concinna (Dunker, 1857); Hemidaphne concinna (Dunker, 1857); Pleurotoma concinna Dunker, 1857

= Daphnella concinna =

Species of gastropod

Daphnella concinna is a species of sea snail, a marine gastropod mollusk in the family Raphitomidae.

== Distribution ==
This marine species occurs off Samoa and the Andaman Islands.
