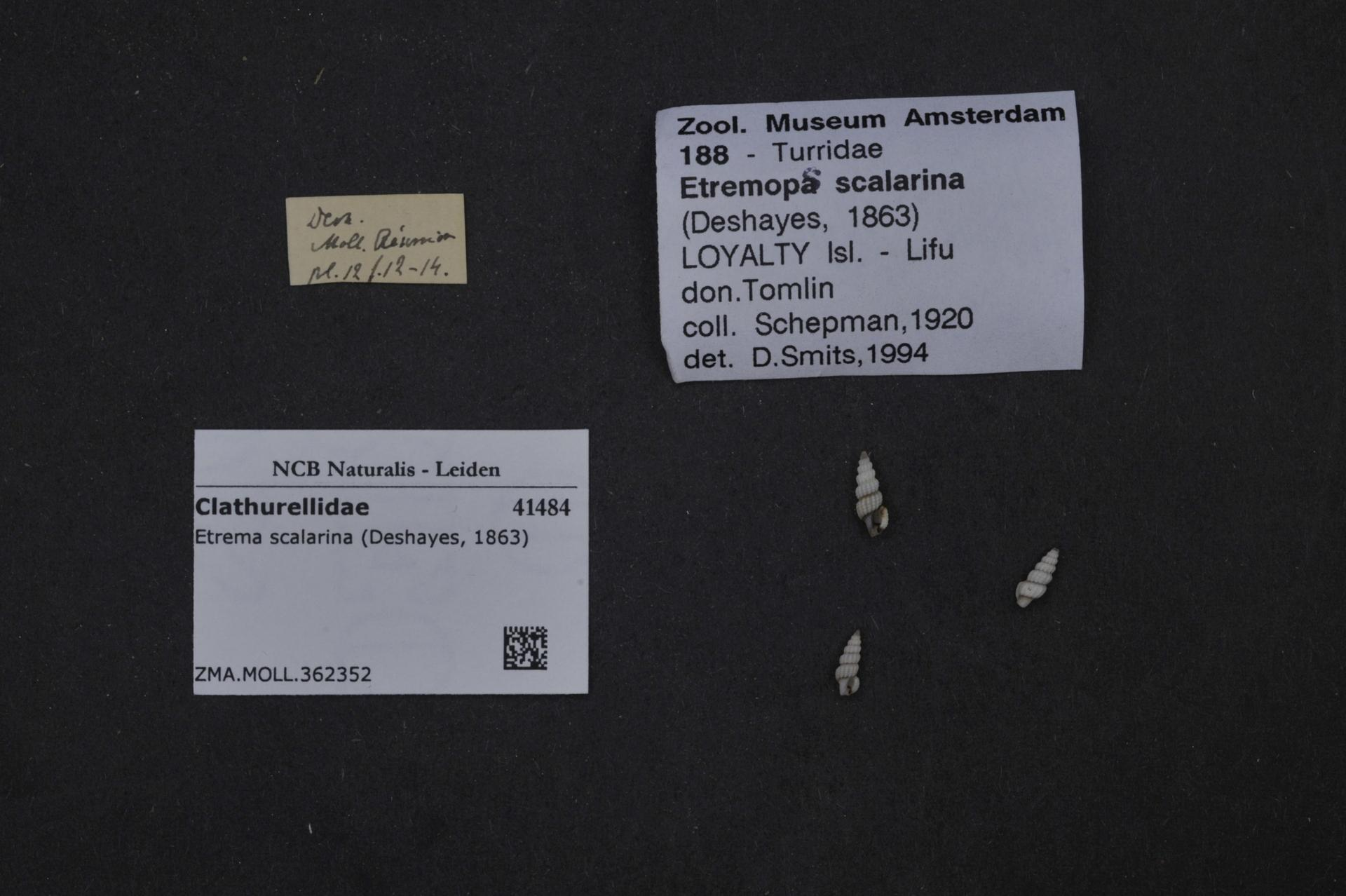

Scientific classification
- Kingdom: Animalia
- Phylum: Mollusca
- Class: Gastropoda
- Subclass: Caenogastropoda
- Order: Neogastropoda
- Family: Clathurellidae
- Genus: Etrema
- Species: E. scalarina

Binomial name
- Etrema scalarina (Deshayes, 1863)

Synonyms
- Clathurella scalarina (Deshayes, 1863); Defrancia scalarina (Deshayes, 1863); Glyphostoma callistum Hervier, 1896; Glyphostoma scalarinum (Deshayes, 1863); Pleurotoma scalarina Deshayes, 1863

= Etrema scalarina =

Species of gastropod

Etrema scalarina is a species of sea snail, a marine gastropod mollusc in the family Clathurellidae.

== Description ==
The shell grows to a length of 9 mm. The shell is whitish, with a narrow chestnut or chocolate sutural band, and another below the middle of the body whorl only.

== Distribution ==
This species occurs in the Indian Ocean along Madagascar, Réunion; in the Central Pacific Ocean.
