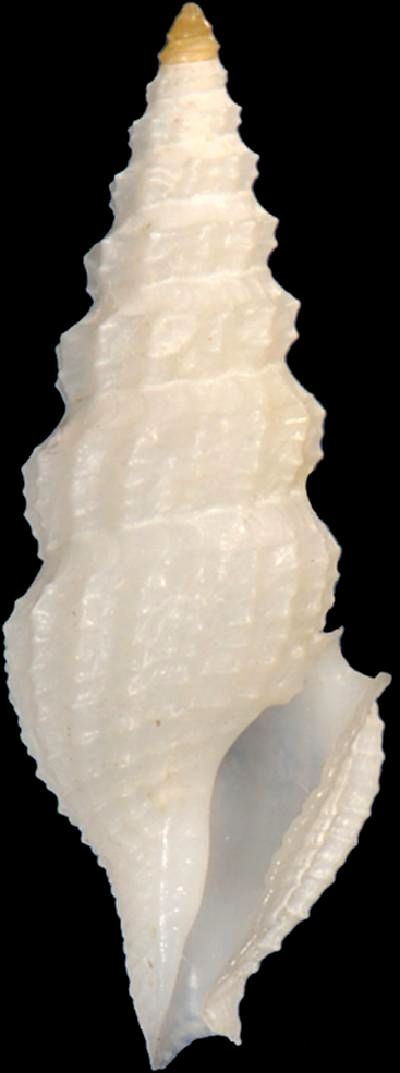
- Shell of Glyphostoma gratula (specimen at MNHN, Paris)

Scientific classification
- Kingdom: Animalia
- Phylum: Mollusca
- Class: Gastropoda
- Subclass: Caenogastropoda
- Order: Neogastropoda
- Family: Clathurellidae
- Genus: Glyphostoma
- Species: G. gratula

Binomial name
- Glyphostoma gratula (Dall, 1881)

Synonyms
- Drillia incilis R.B. Watson, 1881; Glyphostoma gratulum (Dall, 1881); Pleurotoma (Drillia) gratula Dall, 1881

= Glyphostoma gratula =

Species of gastropod

Glyphostoma gratula is a species of sea snail, a marine gastropod mollusc in the family Clathurellidae.

== Description ==
The length of the shell attains 13 mm, its diameter 5.25 mm.

(Original description) The slender, acute shell is white, smooth, but not polished. It contains ten or eleven whorls when adult. The whorls of the protoconch as in Corinnaeturris leucomata (Dall, 1881), except that the protoconch itself is smaller and more acute; the notch-band narrower, occupying only about a quarter of the surface in the smaller whorls, and descending but slightly, thus giving a somewhat turreted aspect to the spire. The transverse sculpture consists of eleven to (on the body whorl) sixteen slightly oblique rounded ribs, faintly evident across the band and anteriorly extending to the suture, or, on the body whorl, well forward on the siphonal canal. These are crossed by (on the smaller whorls) two to four or (on the last one) sixteen rounded threads, distinct in the interspaces and slightly swollen on the tops of the ribs where they cross. Half of those on the body whorl are in its anterior third, being as usual more crowded on the siphonal canal. The lines of growth are but slightly visible, and there are only faint indications of spiral striae. In addition to this the entire surface is covered with most minute punctations, visible only under a strong magnifier. The anal sinus in the adult is very deep, with its edges raised and directed backward. The outer lip is produced forward and inward so much as to cover the entire aperture when the shell is held so that the bottom of the notch is kept in view. The outer lip is thickened, and with four to eight small denticulations rising from its surface a short distance within its margin. The columella is straight and somewhat thickened. There is a slight callus on body whorl. The siphonal canal is very slightly recurved. One adult has an ashy and another an olive tinge, but a fresh specimen is quite white.

== Distribution ==
This species occurs in the Gulf of Mexico from Florida to Texas and in the Caribbean Sea off Cuba.
