= Etrema aliciae =

Scientific classification
- Kingdom: Animalia
- Phylum: Mollusca
- Class: Gastropoda
- Subclass: Caenogastropoda
- Order: Neogastropoda
- Family: Clathurellidae
- Genus: Etrema
- Species: E. aliciae

Binomial name
- Etrema aliciae (Melvill & Standen, 1895)

Synonyms
- Etrema (Etrema) aliciae (Melvill & Standen, 1895); Glyphostoma aliciae (Melvill & Standen, 1895); Mangilia aliciae Melvill & Standen, 1895

Species of gastropod

Etrema aliciae is a species of sea snail, a marine gastropod mollusk in the family Clathurellidae.

== Distribution ==
This marine species occurs along north and east Australia and the Loyalty Islands.
