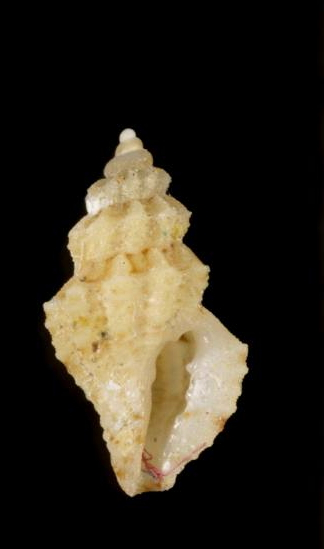
- Shell of Heterocithara himerta (museum specimen at MNHN, Paris)

Scientific classification
- Kingdom: Animalia
- Phylum: Mollusca
- Class: Gastropoda
- Subclass: Caenogastropoda
- Order: Neogastropoda
- Superfamily: Conoidea
- Family: Mangeliidae
- Genus: Heterocithara; Hedley, 1922

Type species
- Clathurella bilineata Angas, 1871

Species
- See text

= Heterocithara =

Genus of molluscs

Heterocithara is a genus of sea snails, marine gastropod mollusks in the family Mangeliidae.

== Description ==
The small shell is biconical and solid. It contains numerous perpendicular riblets extending from the suture to the base These are overrun by smaller spiral cords, between which are dense microscopic hairlines. No fasciole The varix is larger than the ribs The sinus is small. Within the outer lip are a series of denticules.

== Distribution ==
This marine genus occurs off Indonesia and Australia (New South Wales, Queensland, Victoria)

Fossils have been found in Australian Tertiary strata, in Miocene strata in New Zealand and Quaternary strata in China.

== Species ==
Species within the genus Heterocithara include:

- Heterocithara bilineata (Angas, 1871)
- Heterocithara concinna Hedley, 1922
- Heterocithara erismata Hedley, 1922
- † Heterocithara granolirata (Powell, 1944)
- Heterocithara himerta (Melvill & Standen, 1896)
- Heterocithara hirsuta (De Folin, 1867)
- † Heterocithara laterculus Marwick, 1931
- † Heterocithara marwicki Maxwell, 1988
- Heterocithara mediocris Odhner, 1924
- † Heterocithara miocenica Powell, 1944
- Heterocithara rigorata (Hedley, 1909)
- Heterocithara seriliola Hedley, 1922
- Heterocithara sibogae Shuto, 1970
- Heterocithara transenna Hedley, 1922
- Heterocithara tribulationis (Hedley, 1909)
- Heterocithara zebuensis (Reeve, 1846)
