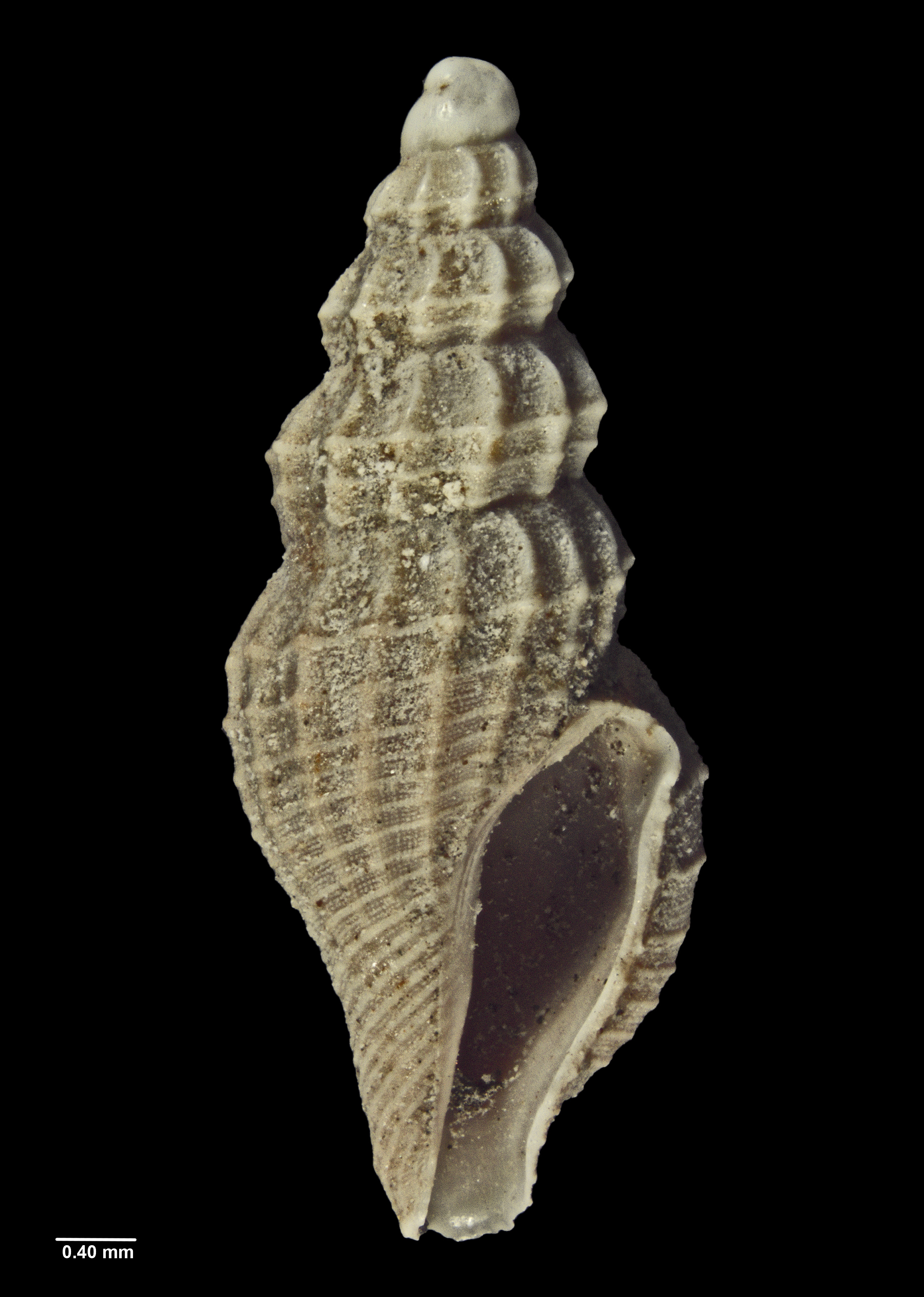
- Holotype from Auckland War Memorial Museum

Scientific classification
- Kingdom: Animalia
- Phylum: Mollusca
- Class: Gastropoda
- Subclass: Caenogastropoda
- Order: Neogastropoda
- Family: Mangeliidae
- Genus: Heterocithara
- Species: †H. granolirata

Binomial name
- †Heterocithara granolirata (A. W. B. Powell, 1944)

Synonyms
- † Etrema granolirata A. W. B. Powell, 1944 (original combination)

= Heterocithara granolirata =

Heterocithara granolirata Temporal range: middle Miocene

Extinct species of gastropod

Heterocithara granolirata is an extinct species of sea snail, a marine gastropod mollusc in the family Mangeliidae. Fossils of the species date to the middle Miocene, and occurs in the strata of the Port Phillip Basin of Victoria, Australia.

== Description ==
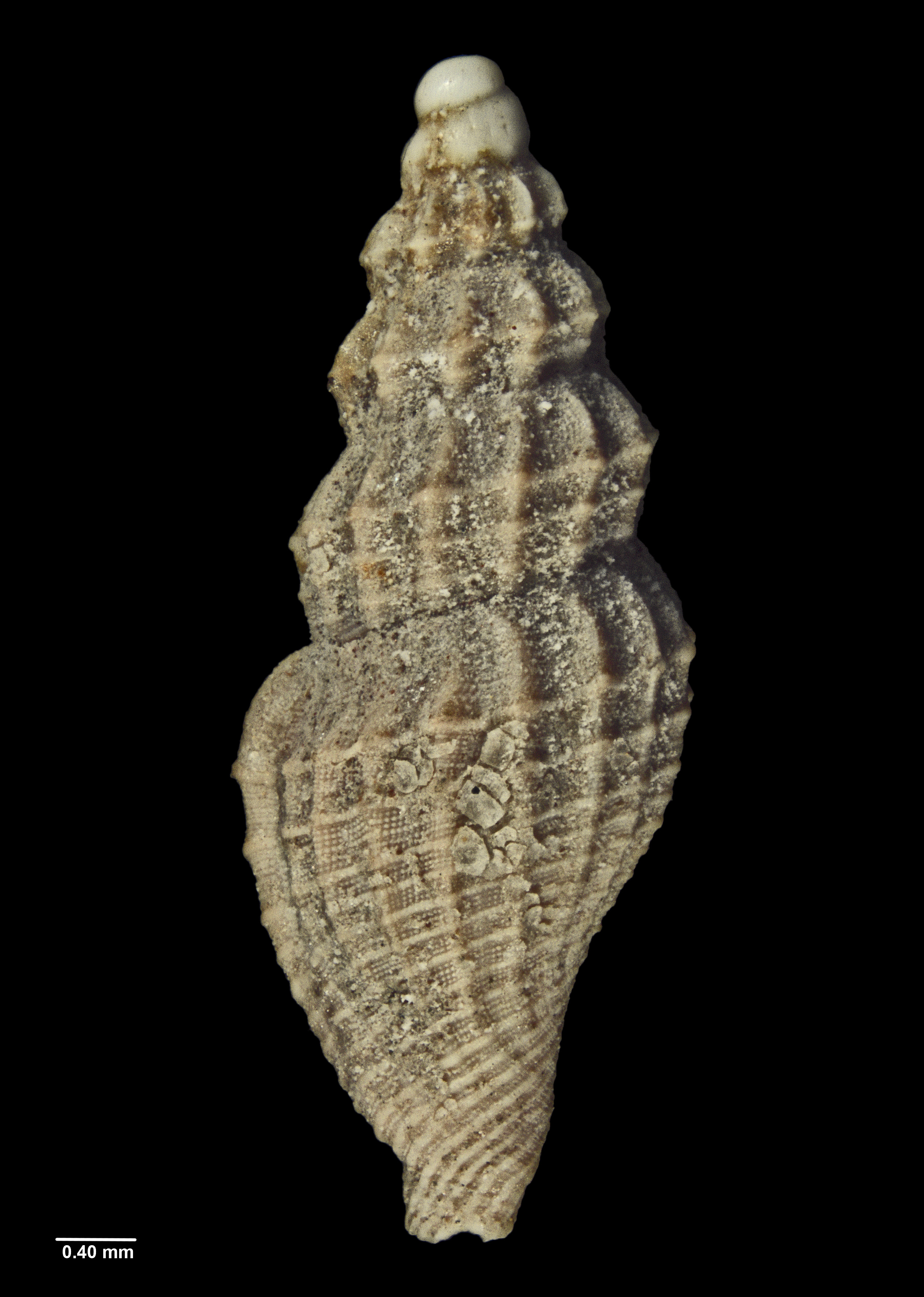
Reverse view of holotype

In the original description, Powell described the species as follows:

Small, narrowly fusiform, with medial, sharply angulate periphery. Sculptured with strong, narrowly rounded axials, narrow, sharply raised spirals, the latter undulating over the axials, and dense interstitial granular lirations. Protoconch small, globular, of two smooth whorls, the second subangulate. Spire-whorls with 7 lirations on the shoulder, 3-4 spiral cords from peripheral angle to lower suture, the peripheral cord being much the strongest. Body-whorl with about 19 primary cords. Granular lirations 2-4 per interspace. Axials strong, undiminished over shoulder and extending half way across base, 13 per whorl. Labial varix heavily rounded. Sinus broad and shallow. Very slight parietal callus pad. No apertural lirations.

The holotype of the species measures 6.2 mm (0.24 in) in height and 2.75 mm (0.108 in) in diameter.

== Taxonomy ==
The species was first described by A.W.B. Powell in 1944, using the name Etrema granolirata. It was moved to the genus Heterocithara in 1988. The holotype was collected from Balcombe Bay, Mornington, Victoria at an unknown date prior to 1944, and is held by the Auckland War Memorial Museum.

== Distribution ==
This extinct marine species dates to the middle Miocene, and occurs in the strata of the Port Phillip Basin of Victoria, Australia, from the Gellibrand Formation.
