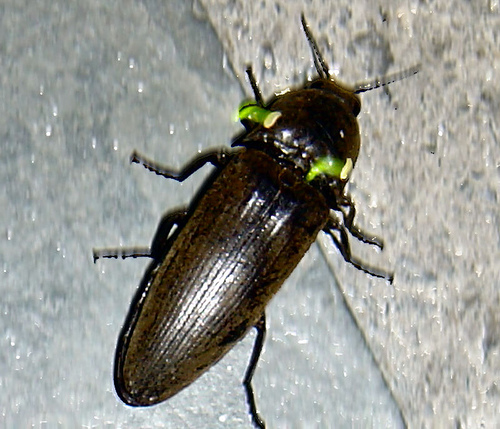
- Jamaican click beetle Pyrophorus noctilucus

Scientific classification
- Kingdom: Animalia
- Phylum: Arthropoda
- Class: Insecta
- Order: Coleoptera
- Suborder: Polyphaga
- Infraorder: Elateriformia
- Family: Elateridae
- Subfamily: Agrypninae
- Tribe: Pyrophorini
- Genus: Pyrophorus
- Species: P. noctilucus

Binomial name
- Pyrophorus noctilucus (Linnaeus, 1758)

Synonyms
- Elater noctilucus Linnaeus, 1758

= Pyrophorus noctilucus =

Species of beetle

Pyrophorus noctilucus, common name headlight elater, is a species of click beetle (family Elateridae).

== Description ==
Pyrophorus noctilucus can reach a length of 20–40 millimetres (0.79–1.57 in). The basic coloration is dark brown. The antennae are serrate. The pronotum shows a long backward-pointing tooth.

These beetles are among the brightest bioluminescent insects. With a brightness of around 45 millilamberts, they are said to be technically bright enough to read by. They achieve their luminescence by means of two light organs at the posterior corners of the prothorax, and a broad area on the underside of the first abdominal segment. Their bioluminescence is similar to that of another group of beetles, the fireflies, although click beetles do not flash, but remain constantly glowing (though they can control the intensity; for example, they become brighter when touched by a potential predator). Also the larvae and the pupae have light organs and the eggs are luminous too.

Adults feed on pollen, fermenting fruit and sometimes small insects, while the larvae live in the soil and feed on various plant materials and invertebrates, as well on the larvae of other beetles.

== Distribution ==
This species occurs in the Caribbean, and can be found in Saint Vincent and the Grenadines, Cuba, Brazil, Puerto Rico, Dominican Republic, Haiti, and Jamaica. Reports from other countries are other species, often in other genera (e.g., Deilelater or Ignelater).
