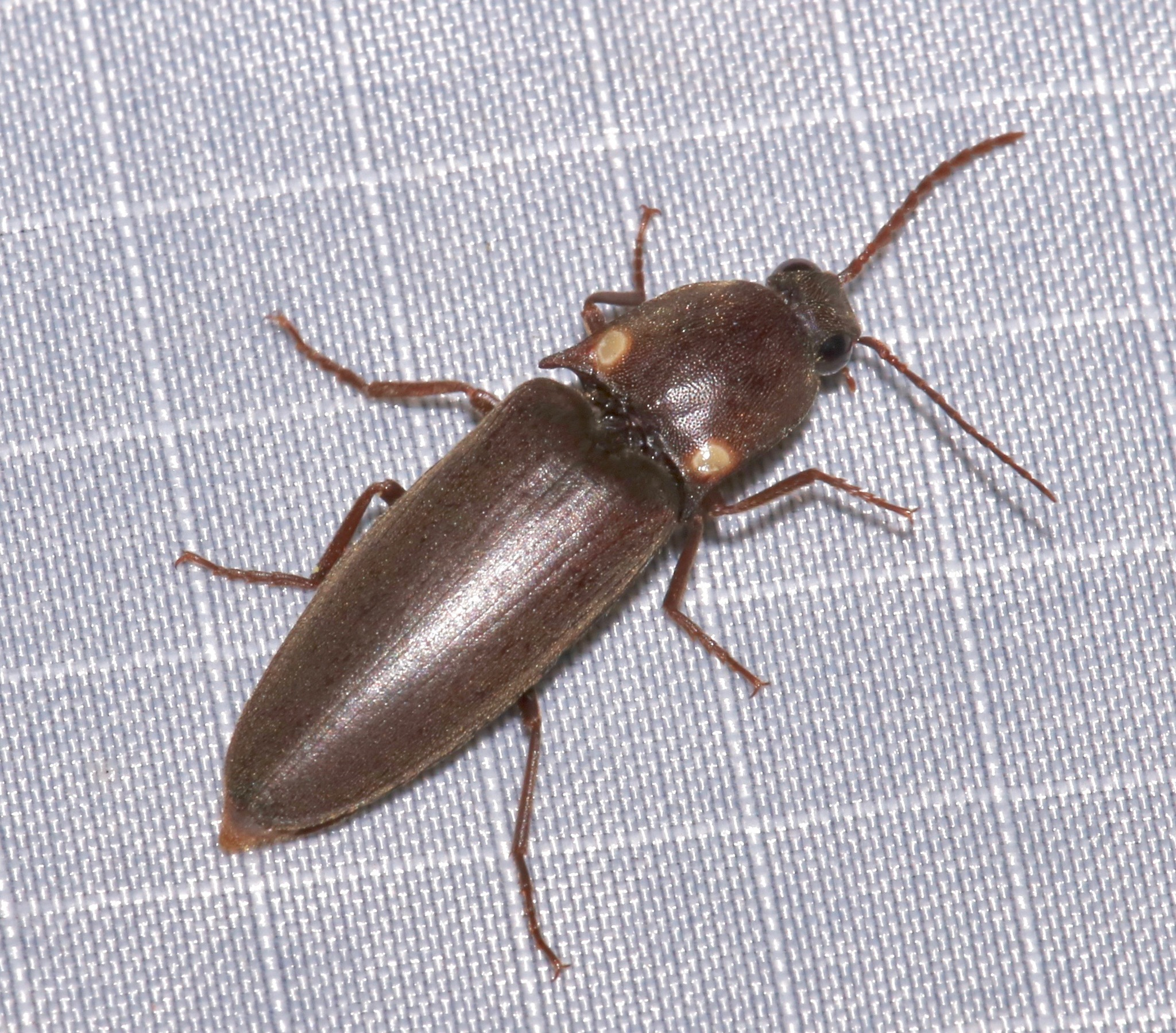
- Vesperelater arizonicus (Santa Cruz County, Arizona, United States)

Scientific classification
- Domain: Eukaryota
- Kingdom: Animalia
- Phylum: Arthropoda
- Class: Insecta
- Order: Coleoptera
- Suborder: Polyphaga
- Infraorder: Elateriformia
- Family: Elateridae
- Subfamily: Agrypninae
- Tribe: Pyrophorini
- Genus: Vesperelater; Costa, 1975

Type species
- Pyrophorus ornamentum Germar, 1841

Species
- 9(+1); see text

= Vesperelater =

Genus of beetles

Vesperelater is a genus of click beetle (family Elateridae). They are one of several genera in the tribe Pyrophorini, all of which are bioluminescent. This genus was established by Cleide Costa in 1975, with 4 species split from Pyrophorus.

== Description ==
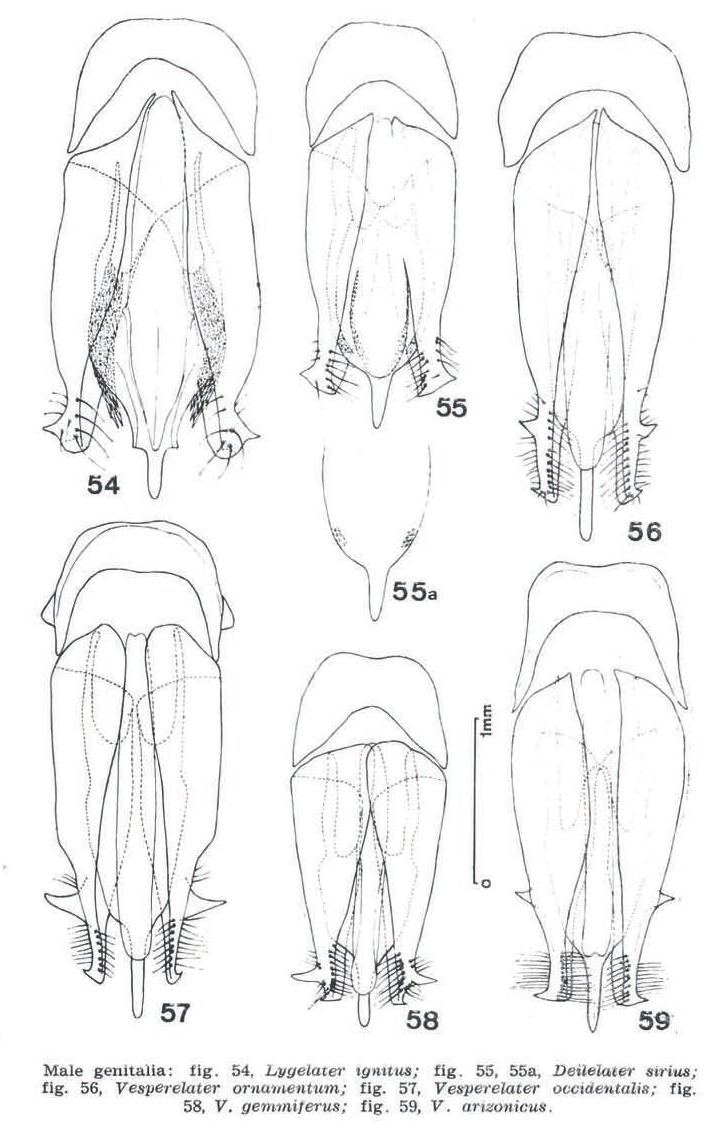
Male genitalia of several species under the tribe Pyrophorini; top-middle: Vesperelater sirius (with 2 figures); top-right: V. ornamentum; bottom-left: V. occidentalis; bottom-middle: V. gemmiferus; bottom-right: V. arizonicus

Small, slender. Reddish-brown. Pubescence short, dense and yellowish. Eyes slightly prominent. Front narrow, not prominent. Antennae reaching the hind angles of the prothorax; second and third segments subequal, the two together of the same length as the fourth. Prothorax little convex. Luminous spots lateral, slightly convex and also visible beneath in the proepisternum. Luminous abdominal organ small and lamellate. Elytra tapering and rounded to apices. Male genitalia: median lobe abruptly narrowed near the apex; lateral lobes with one or more pairs of long spines. Female genitalia: bursa copulatrix spiraled and with long spines; median oviduct with two pair of sclerotized plates.

Deilelater, another genus of the tribe Pyrophorini occurring in Southeastern United States, Mexico, etc., is distinguished from Vesperelater in male genitalia with well-developed median lobe with numerous cuticular, minute scales.

== Range ==
Species of this genus occurs in the United States (Arizona) and Central America, from Mexico to Costa Rica.

== List of species ==
4 species were transferred from Pyrophorus by Costa (1975) and 5 new species were described by Riese (2012) (with type localities given).

- Vesperelater arizonicus (Hyslop, 1918) - Patagonia Mountains, Arizona, U.S.A.
- Vesperelater chamelai Riese, 2012 - Chamela, Jalisco, Mexico
- Vesperelater davidsoni Riese, 2012 - 'Chihualtan', Jalisco, Mexico
- Vesperelater gemmiferus (Germar, 1841) - Mexico
- Vesperelater guerreroi Riese, 2012 - Chilpancingo, Guerrero, Mexico
- Vesperelater occidentalis (Champion, 1896) - Islas Marías, Mexico
- Vesperelater ornamentum (Germar, 1841) - Mexico
- Vesperelater rawlinsi Riese, 2012 - Arteaga, Michoacán, Mexico
- Vesperelater saltinii Riese, 2012 - Puerto Vallarta, Jalisco, Mexico
- Vesperelater sirius (Candèze, 1878) (syn. Deilelater sirius (Candèze, 1878)) - Costa Rica ...... tentatively treated here by Rosa (2007) and followed by Riese (2012)

== Bibliography ==
- Costa, C. (1975). "Systematics and evolution of the tribes Pyrophorini and Heligmini, with description of Campyloxeninae, new subfamily (Coleoptera, Elateridae)". Arquivos de Zoologia. 26 (2): 49–190. doi:10.11606/issn.2176-7793.v26i2p49-190. This article incorporates text by Cleide Costa available under the CC BY 4.0 license.
- Rosa, S.P. (2007). Análise Filogenetica e Revisão Taxonômica da tribo Pyrophorini Candèze, 1863 (Coleoptera, Elateridae, Agrypninae) (Doctor thesis) (in Portuguese). University of São Paulo. pp. xii + 241. doi:10.11606/T.41.2007.tde-04092007-174412.
- Riese, S. (2012). "Note sul genere neotropicale Vesperelater Costa, 1975 con descrizione di cinque nuove specie e chiavi dicotomiche per le specie note (Coleoptera Elateridae) [Notes about the Neotropical genus Vesperelater Costa, 1975, with description of five new species and keys to the known species (Coleoptera Elateridae Pyrophorinae)]". Bollettino della Società Entomologica Italiana (in Italian). 144 (3): 117–124. doi:10.4081/BollettinoSEI.2012.117.
