= Hypsiophthalmus =

Scientific classification
- Kingdom: Animalia
- Phylum: Arthropoda
- Class: Insecta
- Order: Coleoptera
- Suborder: Polyphaga
- Infraorder: Elateriformia
- Family: Elateridae
- Tribe: Pyrophorini
- Genus: Hypsiophthalmus; Latreille, 1834

Type species
- Pyrophorus buphthalmus Eschscholtz, 1829

Species
- 10; see text

Synonyms
- Belania Laporte, 1840

Genus of beetles

Hypsiophthalmus is a genus of click beetles in the family Elateridae. They are one of several genera in the tribe Pyrophorini. This genus was established by French zoologist Pierre André Latreille in 1834 posthumously and then reviewed by Cleide Costa in 1975 (with 5 species split from Pyrophorus) and in 1979 (with description of 3 new species and 2 recombinations from Pyrophorus).

== Description ==
Dark brown or black. Glabrous or with pubescence extremely fine, short and sparse. Eyes very prominent in males and smaller in females. Antennae very short, 11-segmented, slightly serrate from the fourth segment onwards; second segment short and spherical, third elongate and of the same length as the fourth. Mouth pieces, a little depressed in males because of the great development of the eyes. Prothorax small and trapezoidal in males; convex, rounded to sides in females. Luminous spots localized posteriorly, round, visible also on the proepisternum (in males they are smaller than in females). Mesosternal cavity sinusoidal. Metacoxal plates of the same width throughout. Abdominal luminous organ usually median sized; frequently less developed or vestigial in the female. Elytra weakly punctate-striate, sides and apices marginated; in female less punctulate. Male genitalia: simple, median lobe little developed. Female genitalia: bursa copulatrix with a single spiral and a few long spines; median oviduct without sclerotized plates; accessory glands little developed. Sexual dimorphism extremely accentuated; in addition to the characters already referred to, the female has vestigial hind wings.

== List of species ==
The following 10 species are accepted by Costa (1979) (with each type locality given).

- Hypsiophthalmus ardens (Candèze, 1863) - Minas Gerais, Brazil
- Hypsiophthalmus boops (Germar, 1841) - Brazil
- Hypsiophthalmus buphthalmus (Eschscholtz, 1829) - La Plata, Argentina
- Hypsiophthalmus charops Costa, 1979 - Teresópolis, Rio de Janeiro, Brazil
- Hypsiophthalmus grossicollis (Blanchard, 1843) - Corrientes, Argentina
- Hypsiophthalmus longipennis (Germar, 1841) - Brazil
- Hypsiophthalmus luscius Costa, 1979 - São Paulo, Brazil
- Hypsiophthalmus microspilus Germar, 1841 - Santa Catarina, Brazil
- Hypsiophthalmus punctatum Costa, 1979 - Paraguay
- Hypsiophthalmus raninus (Eschscholtz, 1829) - Santa Catarina, Brazil
