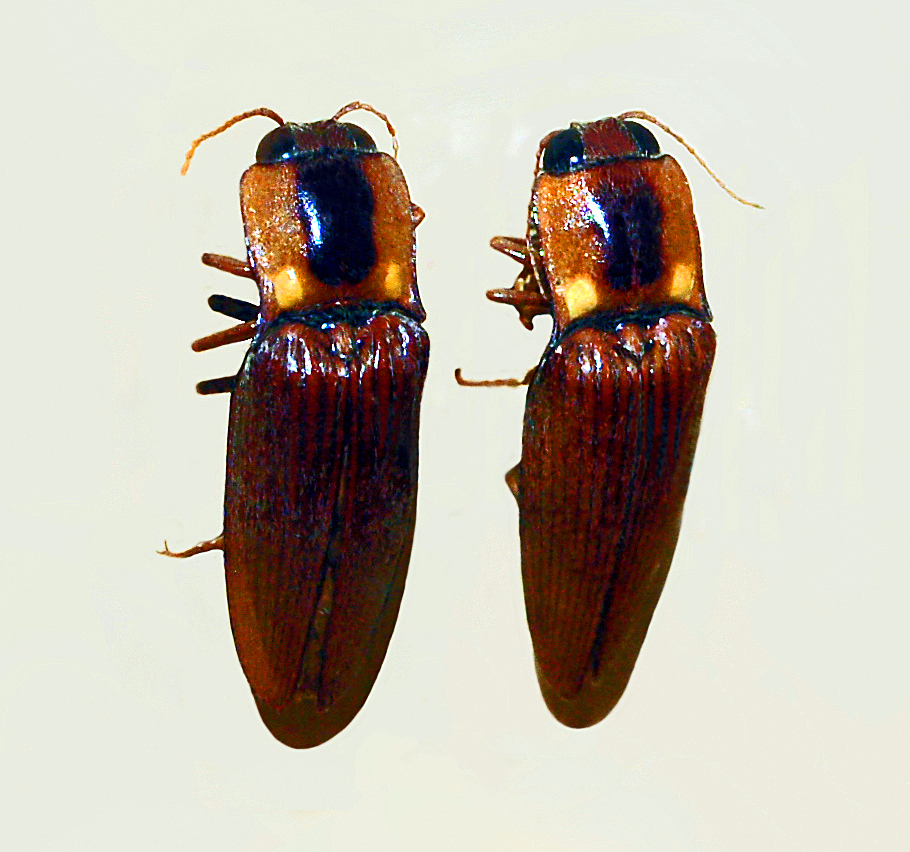
- Pyrearinus candelarius from Argentina. Mounted specimen

Scientific classification
- Domain: Eukaryota
- Kingdom: Animalia
- Phylum: Arthropoda
- Class: Insecta
- Order: Coleoptera
- Suborder: Polyphaga
- Infraorder: Elateriformia
- Family: Elateridae
- Subfamily: Agrypninae
- Tribe: Pyrophorini
- Genus: Pyrearinus; Costa, 1975

Type species
- Pyrophorus nyctolampis Germar, 1841

= Pyrearinus =

Genus of beetles

Pyrearinus is a genus of click beetle (family Elateridae).

As one of the members of the tribe Pyrophorini, all species of this genus have luminous organs on their abdomen; among them, larvae of Pyrearinus termitilluminans (described from Emas National Park, Brazil) are responsible for so-called "luminous termite hill" known to human beings at least since 1850.

== Description ==
Size variable (from 7 to 26 mm). Brownish or black; some species have a bicolorous prothorax (lateral margins yellowish or reddish and discal region darker). Pubescence dense, short and yellowish or not so dense and apparently absent. Eyes little prominent in males. Antennae short, serrate from the fourth segment onwards; second small, third a little longer, elongate and almost of the same length as the fourth. Prothorax more or less convex. Luminous spots flat or slightly convex, localized posteriorly; in species with bicolorous prothorax the spots are confused with the color of the integument. Punctures variable. Mesosternal cavity sinusoidal. Metacoxal plates tapering outwardly. Abdominal luminous organ small, sometimes indistinct. Male genitalia extremely homogeneous; median lobe tapering to apex; lateral lobe short. Female genitalia, bursa copulatrix more or less spiraled with a variable number of long spines; median oviduct with sclerotized plates. Sexual dimorphism more or less accentuated, males with eyes larger than the females, and with longer antennae; in one species group (nyctolampis) the females have hind wings little shorter than usual.

== List of species ==
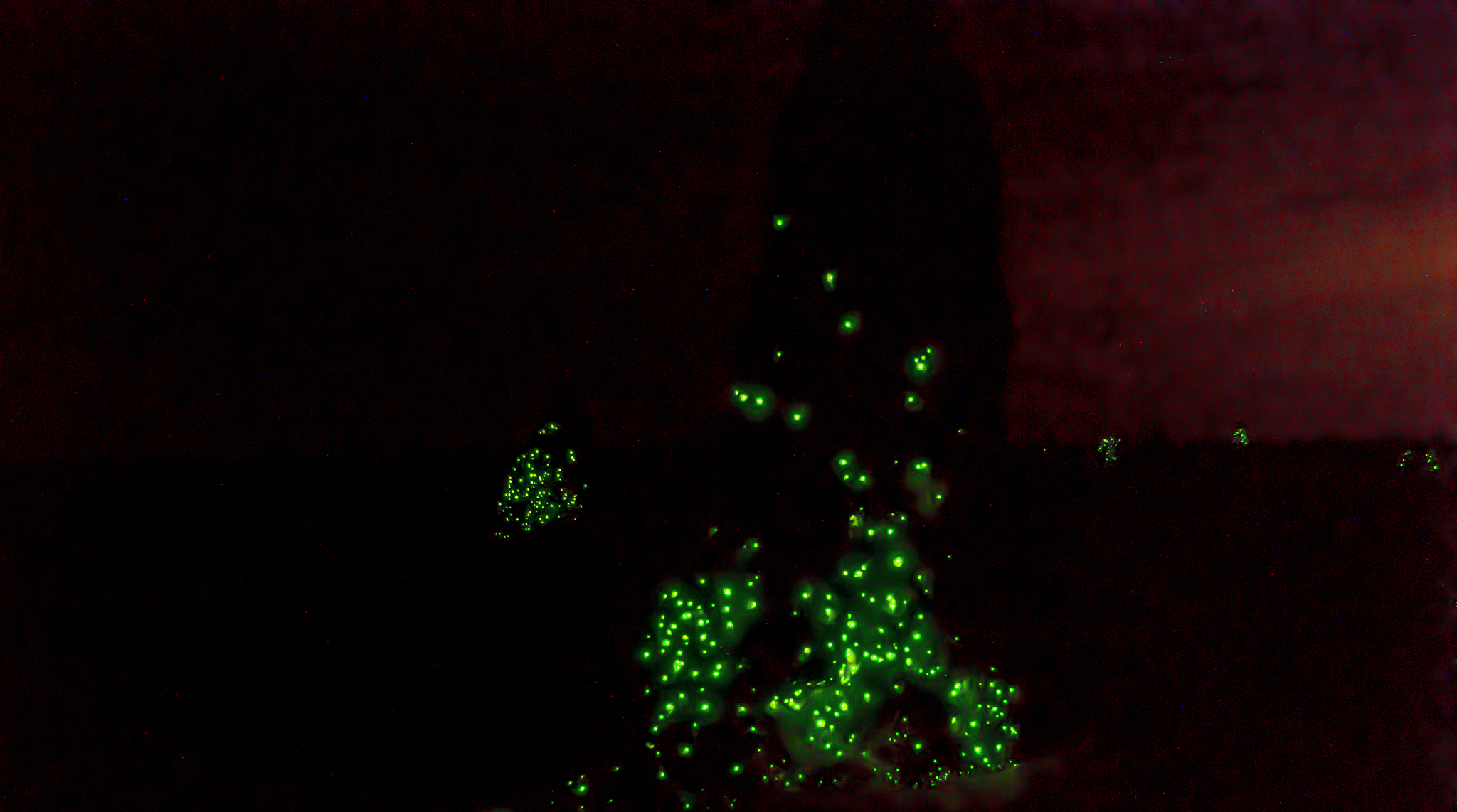
Larvae of Pyrearinus termitilluminans glowing on termite hills in Goiás, Brazil.

The following list is based upon Costa (1978) unless otherwise noted.

- Pyrearinus acutus (Candèze, 1863) Colombia
- Pyrearinus adustus Costa, 1978 Brazil
- Pyrearinus alvarengai (Cobos, 1959) Argentina; Brazil
- Pyrearinus amplicollis (Candèze, 1863) Suriname; French Guiana
- Pyrearinus baliolus Costa, 1978 Uruguay
- Pyrearinus basalis (Schwarz, 1902) Ecuador
- Pyrearinus brevicollis (Eschscholtz, 1829) Brazil
- Pyrearinus brunneus Costa, 1978 Argentina
- Pyrearinus candelarius (Germar, 1841) Brazil, Argentina
- Pyrearinus castaneus Costa, 1978 Brazil
- Pyrearinus cereus Costa, 1978 Brazil
- Pyrearinus cinerarius (Germar, 1841) Brazil
- Pyrearinus cinnameus Costa, 1978 Brazil
- Pyrearinus coctilis Costa, 1978 Brazil
- Pyrearinus commissator (Germar, 1841) Brazil
- Pyrearinus depressicollis (Blanchard, 1843) Bolivia
- Pyrearinus ferrugineus Costa, 1978 Argentina
- Pyrearinus flatus Costa, 1978 Brazil
- Pyrearinus fragilis Costa, 1978 Brazil
- Pyrearinus fulgurans (Candèze, 1865) French Guiana
- Pyrearinus fulvescens Costa, 1978 Brazil
- Pyrearinus fulvus Costa, 1978 Brazil
- Pyrearinus janus (Herbst, 1806) Brazil
- Pyrearinus lampadion (Illiger, 1807) Brazil
- Pyrearinus lampyris (Candèze, 1863) Brazil
- Pyrearinus latus Costa, 1978 Brazil
- Pyrearinus lineatus (Candèze, 1863) Paraguay
- Pyrearinus lucernulus (Illiger, 1807) Brazil; Argentina
- Pyrearinus lucidulus (Illiger, 1807) Peru
- Pyrearinus lucificus (Germar, 1841) Brazil
- Pyrearinus luscinus Costa, 1978 Brazil
- Pyrearinus micatus Costa, 1978 Brazil
- Pyrearinus mitarakensis Chassain, 2010 French Guiana
- Pyrearinus nictitans (Illiger, 1807) Brazil
- Pyrearinus nyctolampis (Germar, 1841) Brazil
- Pyrearinus nyctophilus (Germar, 1841) Brazil
- Pyrearinus pumilus (Candèze, 1863) Brazil
- Pyrearinus pusillus Costa, 1978 Paraguay
- Pyrearinus retrospiciens (Illiger, 1807) Brazil
- Pyrearinus ruscus Costa, 1978 Brazil
- Pyrearinus scintillula (Candèze, 1881) Brazil
- Pyrearinus termitilluminans Costa, 1982 Brazil
- Pyrearinus vesculus Costa, 1978 Brazil
- Pyrearinus vescus Costa, 1978 Brazil
- Pyrearinus vitticollis (Germar, 1841) Brazil

=== Synonyms ===
- Pyrearinus candens (Germar, 1841) Brazil - accepted by Costa (1975:100), but synonymized with P. brevicollis by Costa (1979)
- Pyrearinus gibbicollis (Blanchard, 1843) Argentina - accepted by Costa (1975:101), but synonymized with P. nyctolampis by Costa (1978:216)

== Bibliography ==
- Costa, C. (1975). "Systematics and evolution of the tribes Pyrophorini and Heligmini, with description of Campyloxeninae, new subfamily (Coleoptera, Elateridae)". Arquivos de Zoologia. 26 (2): 49–190. doi:10.11606/issn.2176-7793.v26i2p49-190. This article incorporates text by Cleide Costa available under the CC BY 4.0 license.
- Costa, C. (1978). "Sistématica e Bionomia de Pyrearinus Costa, 1975 (Coleoptera, Elateridae)". Arquivos de Zoologia (in Portuguese). 29 (4): 185–236. doi:10.11606/issn.2176-7793.v29i4p185-236.
- Costa, C. (1982). "Pyrearinus termitilluminans, sp.n., with description of the immature stages (Coleoptera, Elateridae, Pyrophorini)". Revista Brasileira de Zoologia. 1 (1): 23–30. doi:10.1590/S0101-81751982000100003.
- Viviani, V.R.; Rosa, S.P.; Prado, R.A.; Pelentir, G.F.; de Souza, D.R.; Reis, R.M.; Bechara, E.J.H. [in Portuguese]; Costa, C. (2023). "Inventory and ecological aspects of bioluminescent beetles in the Cerrado ecosystem and its decline around Emas National Park (Brazil)". Annals of the Entomological Society of America. 116 (6): 386–403. doi:10.1093/aesa/saad029.
