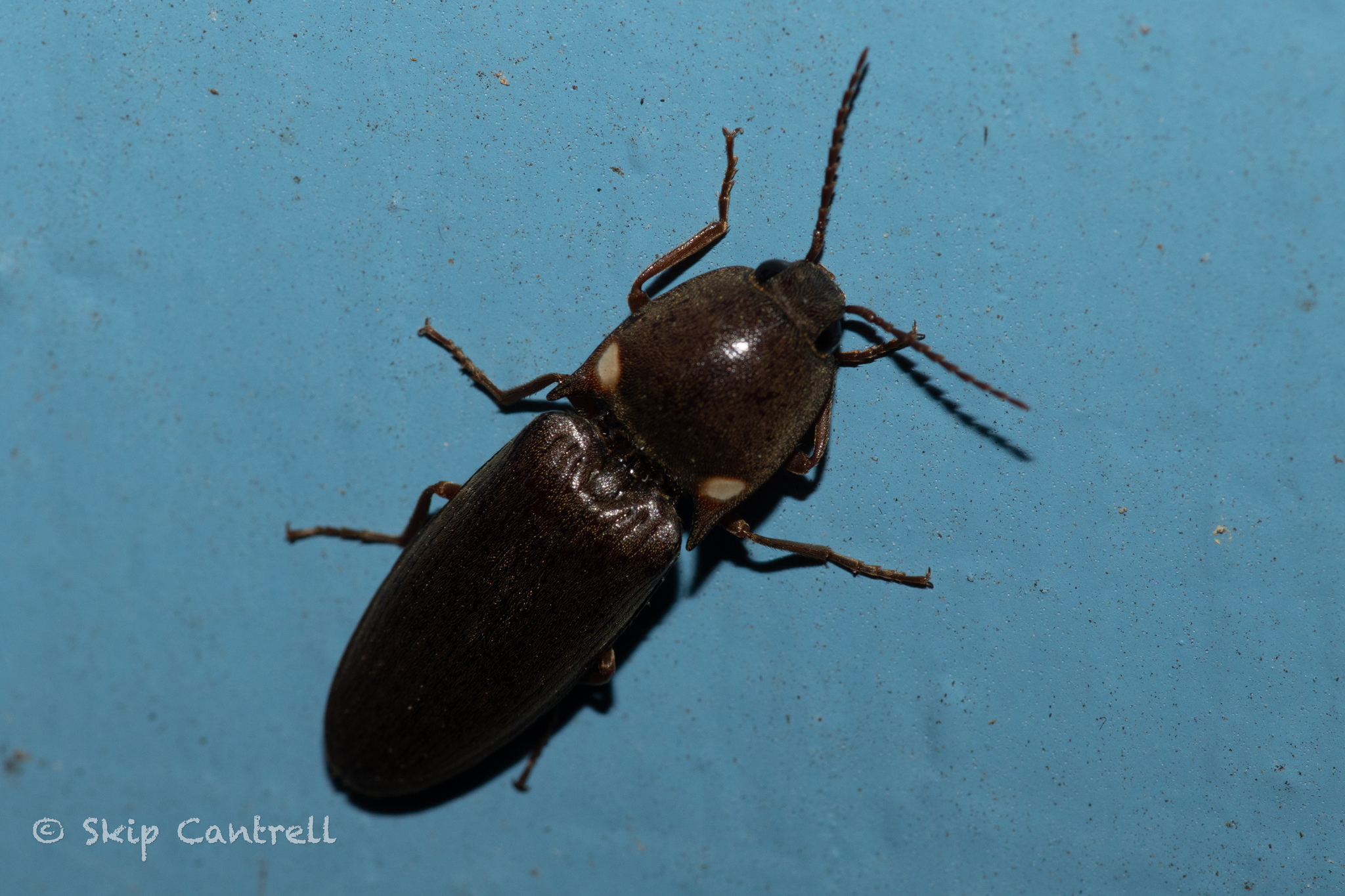
- Deilelater physoderus

Scientific classification
- Domain: Eukaryota
- Kingdom: Animalia
- Phylum: Arthropoda
- Class: Insecta
- Order: Coleoptera
- Suborder: Polyphaga
- Infraorder: Elateriformia
- Family: Elateridae
- Subfamily: Agrypninae
- Tribe: Pyrophorini
- Genus: Deilelater; Costa, 1975

Type species
- Pyrophorus physoderus Germar, 1841

Species
- 7; see text

= Deilelater =

Genus of beetle

Deilelater is a genus of click beetles in the family Elateridae. They are one of several genera in the tribe Pyrophorini, all of which are bioluminescent. This genus was established by Cleide Costa in 1975, with 7 species split from Pyrophorus.

== Description ==
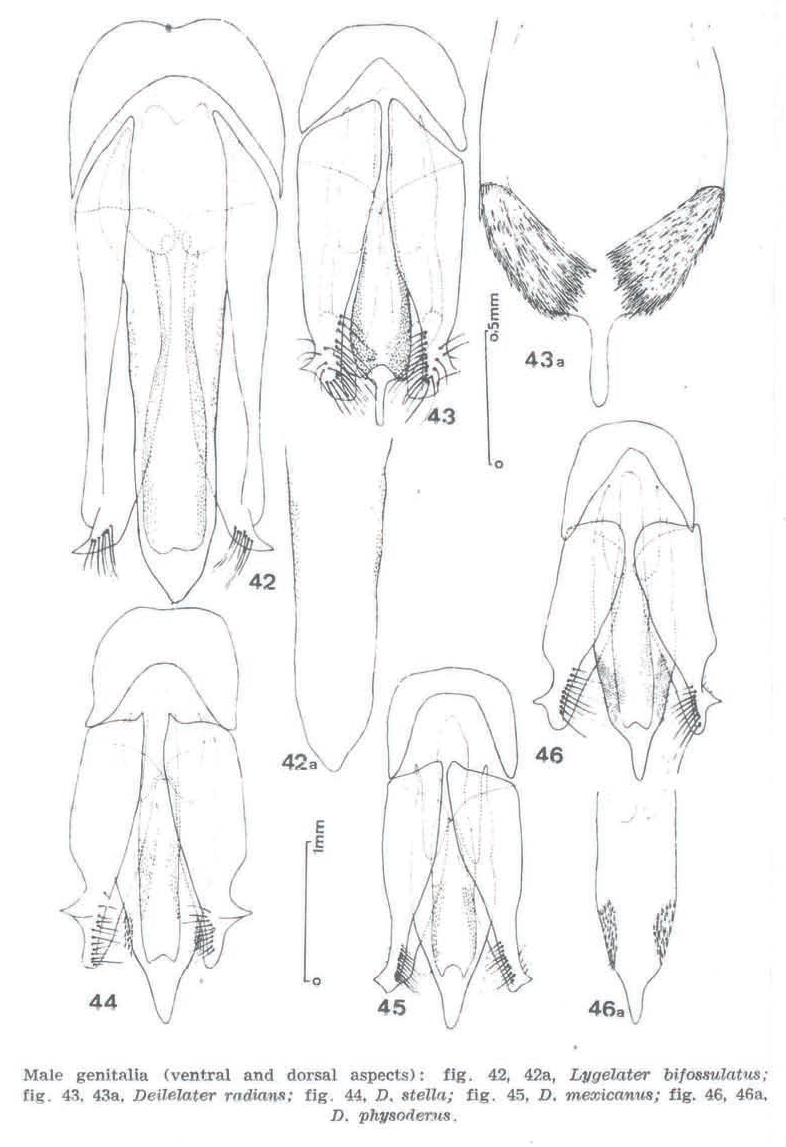
Male genitalia of several species under the tribe Pyrophorini; top-middle & top-right: Deilelater radians; bottom-left: D. stella; bottom-middle: D. mexicanus; bottom-right: D. physoderus

Generally very small. Reddish-brown. Pubescence short, not very dense, yellowish. Eyes slightly convex. Front narrow, not prominent. Antennae reaching hind angles of prothorax; second and third segments subequal; the two together of the same length as the fourth. Prothorax more or less convex; luminous spots lateral, flat or slightly convex, visible also in the proepisternum. Abdominal luminous organ small and lamellate. Elytra sides subparallel, rounded to apices. Male genitalia, median lobe abruptly pointed near apex, with small cuticular scales. Female genitalia: bursa copulatrix spiraled and with long spines; elongate sclerotized plates in the median oviduct.

Vesperelater, another genus of the tribe Pyrophorini occurring in western Mexico and Southwestern United States, is distinguished from Deilelater in male genitalia with lateral lobes with well-developed subapical spines.

== Range ==
Species of this genus occur in Southeastern United States, Mexico, Central America and South America (western side).

== List of species ==
All but D. ustulatus were transferred from Pyrophorus by Costa (1975) (with type localities given).

- Deilelater atlanticus (Hyslop, 1918) - Enterprise, Florida, U.S.A.
- Deilelater bellamyi (Van Zwaluwenburg, 1936) - El Salto, Escuintla, Guatemala [reared]
- Deilelater mexicanus (Champion, 1896) - Yucatán, Mexico
- Deilelater physoderus (Germar, 1841) - Alabama, U.S.A.
- Deilelater radians (Champion, 1896) - 'Pancina' [= Panimá], [Baja] Verapaz, Guatemala
- Deilelater stella (Candèze, 1863) - Mexico
- Deilelater ustulatus Costa, 1983 - Dunedin, Florida, U.S.A.

== Excluded taxa ==
- Deilelater sirius (Candèze, 1878) - Costa Rica; transferred to Vesperelater by Rosa (2007:77, 177–178)

== Bibliography ==
- Costa, C. (1975). "Systematics and evolution of the tribes Pyrophorini and Heligmini, with description of Campyloxeninae, new subfamily (Coleoptera, Elateridae)". Arquivos de Zoologia. 26 (2): 49–190. doi:10.11606/issn.2176-7793.v26i2p49-190. This article incorporates text by Cleide Costa available under the CC BY 4.0 license.
- Rosa, S.P. (2007). Análise Filogenetica e Revisão Taxonômica da tribo Pyrophorini Candèze, 1863 (Coleoptera, Elateridae, Agrypninae) (Doctor thesis) (in Portuguese). University of São Paulo. pp. xii + 241. doi:10.11606/T.41.2007.tde-04092007-174412.
