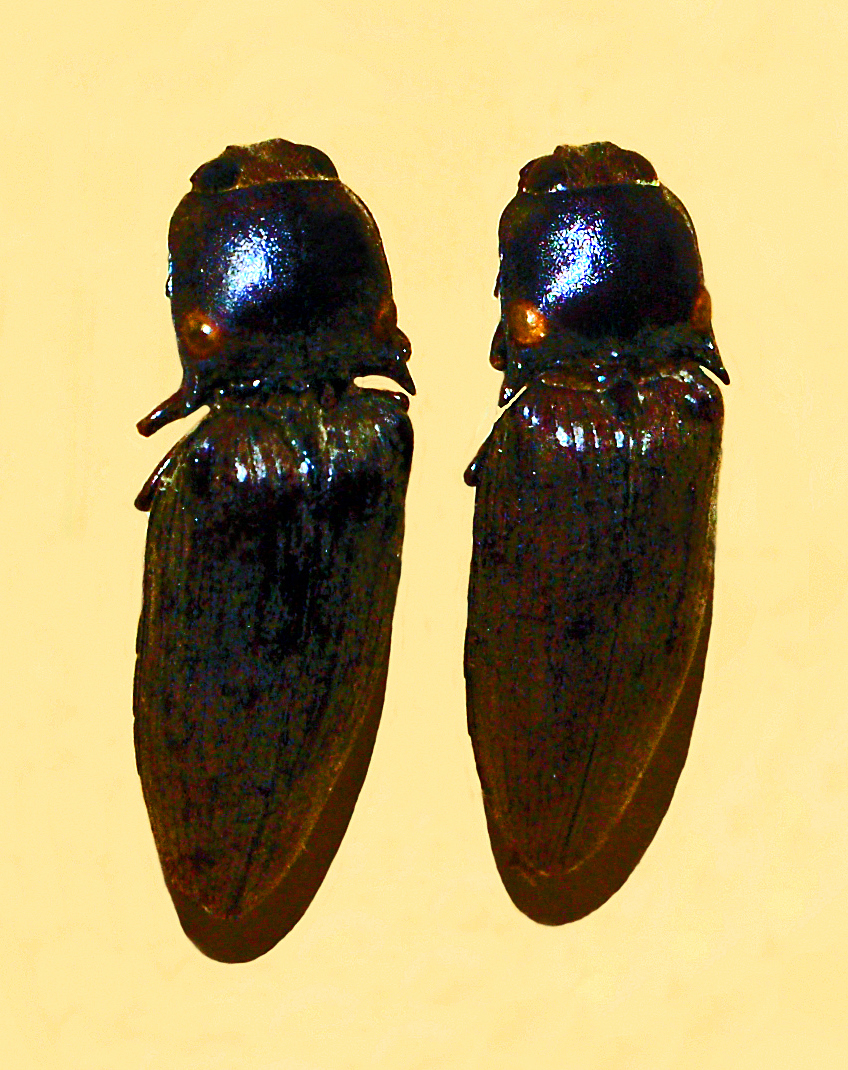
- Pyrophorus tuberculifer from Guadeloupe. Mounted specimen

Scientific classification
- Kingdom: Animalia
- Phylum: Arthropoda
- Clade: Pancrustacea
- Class: Insecta
- Order: Coleoptera
- Suborder: Polyphaga
- Infraorder: Elateriformia
- Family: Elateridae
- Tribe: Pyrophorini
- Genus: Pyrophorus
- Species: P. tuberculifer

Binomial name
- Pyrophorus tuberculifer Eschscholtz, 1829

Synonyms
- Pyrophorus hesperus Candéze, 1863

= Pyrophorus tuberculifer =

Species of beetle

Pyrophorus tuberculifer is a species of click beetle (family Elateridae).

== Description ==
The basic coloration is dark brown. The pronotum shows a long backward-pointing tooth. These beetles are bioluminescent by means of two luminescent light organs at the posterior corners of the prothorax, and a broad area on the underside of the first abdominal segment. Their bioluminescence is similar to that of another group of beetles, the fireflies, although click beetles do not flash, but remain constantly glowing.

== Distribution ==
This species can be found in Mexico, Cuba, Guadeloupe, Brazil, Paraguay and Argentina.
