= Wonder Park (soundtrack) =

Wonder Park (Original Motion Picture Soundtrack)

Film score by Steven Price
- Released: March 8, 2019
- Recorded: 2018–2019
- Venues: Sony Scoring Stage, Sony Pictures Studios, Culver City, California
- Genre: Film score
- Length: 69:46
- Label: Paramount Music
- Producer: Steven Price

Steven Price chronology
| Ophelia (2018) | Wonder Park (2019) | The Aeronauts (2019) |

Wonder Park (Original Motion Picture Soundtrack) is the soundtrack to the 2019 animated film of the same name. Featuring original score composed by Steven Price, in his maiden animated feature film, the album was released on March 8, 2019 by Paramount Music, a week before the film's release.

== Development ==
Price was keen on scoring an animated feature film from the very beginning as he liked animation films and had scored animated shorts from British productions; he would constantly ask agents to recruit an animated feature. The director Dylan Brown had heard few music he had written for the BBC television series The Hunt (2015), and approached him to score for the film, which he agreed. In the film, imagination served as a key theme in the story, where the protagonist had several designs imagined for an amusement park, and hence musically, he need to capture those ideas of a classic theme park, that emulates the creativity went into the script. Trying several experiments into the score, Price integrated the sound of fireworks (which he had pre-recorded) for a percussion theme.

Since the whole park runs on June's invention, he wanted to have the score to feel like "being powered by these whirring cogs and gears, whether they be the small homemade clockwork versions of June’s original model, or the huge towers of the park itself". Hence he created various motifs using bells, chimes and metallic sounds which was recorded at the Sony Scoring Stage in Culver City, California with multiple variations to check the right combination working for the film. It was an intrinsic part of the main park theme, but in crucial scenes where the park fails, the bells and their patterns were stretched and morphed around to sound "damaged" as the park looks. However, the elements of the clockwork swings manages to work throughout the film. June and her mom, also have their separate themes which starts with a warm tone, but moves from major to minor during the melancholic moments. Price had claimed that "My score has a certain structure and then I would add details as I noticed more and more things in the animation. The two things together became more than the sum of their parts."

== Release ==
Rachel Platten has written and recorded an original song "Wonder" for the film, released on February 21, 2019. Grace VanderWaal also recorded a song titled "Hideaway" released as a single on March 1. Neither of those tracks appeared in the soundtrack album, except for "Hideaway" whose medley version co-composed with See Sub-songs, Jonny Shorr, Katie Stump, Will Jay and Emily Kocontes.

A track from Price's score "You'll Hear Me In The Wind" released as a single from the album on March 7, a day before the album's release through Paramount Music.

== Track listing ==
| No. | Title | Length |
|---|---|---|
| 1. | "When The Ideas Come From You" | 6:23 |
| 2. | "Operation Loop de Loop" | 3:32 |
| 3. | "Without Wrecking The Neighbourhood" | 0:51 |
| 4. | "Hideaway Medley" (co-composed with See Sub-songs, Jonny Shorr, Katie Stump, Will Jay, Emily Kocontes) | 4:58 |
| 5. | "Look How Big You've Gotten" | 2:33 |
| 6. | "On The Way to Camp Awesome" | 1:33 |
| 7. | "Entering Wonderland" | 4:04 |
| 8. | "We're At War" | 3:29 |
| 9. | "The Darkness" | 1:31 |
| 10. | "You're Embarrassing The Team" | 3:12 |
| 11. | "Nobody's Pin Cushion" | 2:04 |
| 12. | "On and Off Switch" | 2:18 |
| 13. | "Fireworks Falls" | 3:00 |
| 14. | "Zero G Land" | 3:50 |
| 15. | "All My Fault" | 5:29 |
| 16. | "Wrecking The Neighbourhood" | 2:49 |
| 17. | "A Terrible Turn of Events" | 3:42 |
| 18. | "I Got This Greta" | 2:13 |
| 19. | "I Lost Her Too" | 2:04 |
| 20. | "To Clockwork Swings" | 4:00 |
| 21. | "You'll Hear Me In The Wind" | 3:02 |
| 22. | "Peanut's Next Wondrous Invention" | 3:09 |
| Total length: | | 69:46 |

== Reception ==
Luke Bunting of Set the Tape wrote that the "thematic integrity and vibrant orchestration are the strongest points of Stephen Price’s work for Wonder Park."
