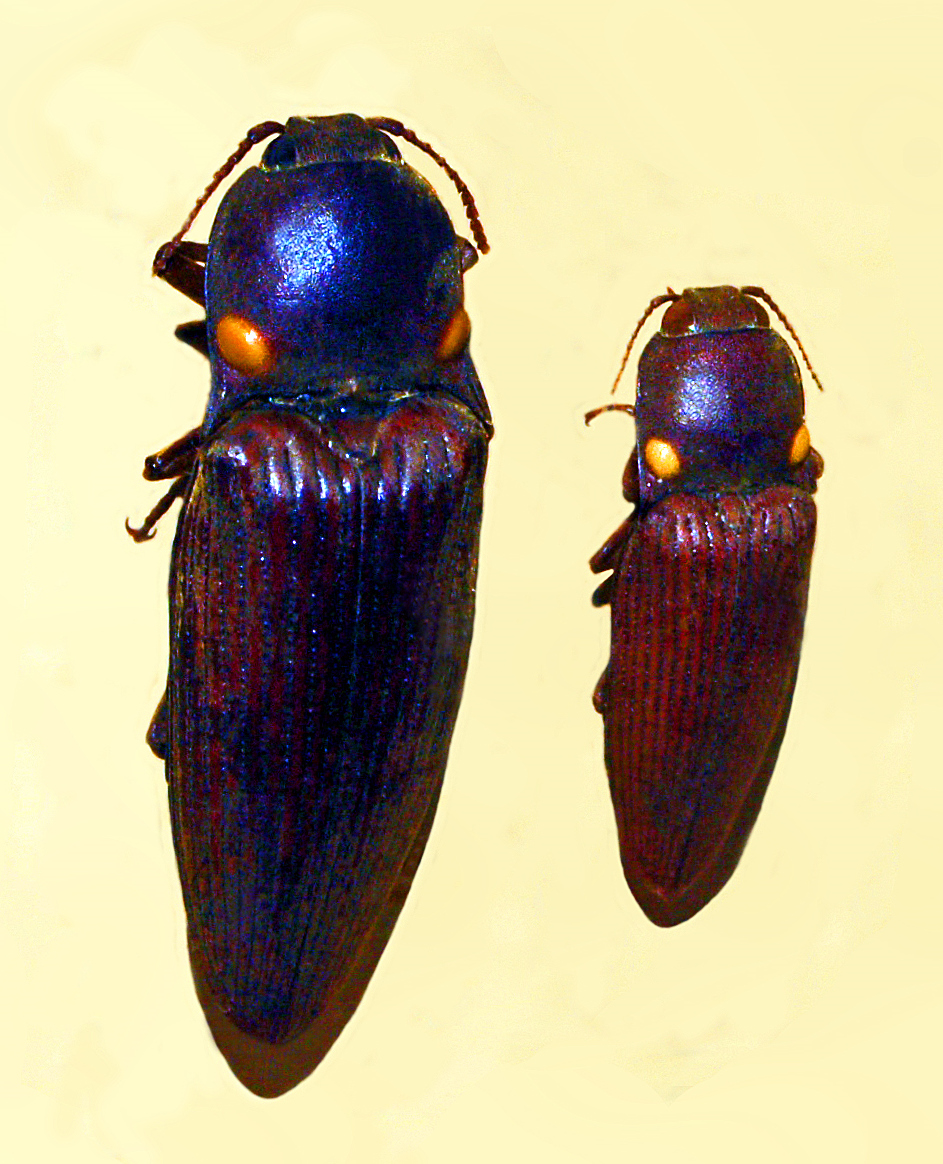
- Pyrophorus punctatissimus from Paraguay. Mounted specimen

Scientific classification
- Kingdom: Animalia
- Phylum: Arthropoda
- Class: Insecta
- Order: Coleoptera
- Suborder: Polyphaga
- Infraorder: Elateriformia
- Family: Elateridae
- Tribe: Pyrophorini
- Genus: Pyrophorus
- Species: P. punctatissimus

Binomial name
- Pyrophorus punctatissimus Blanchard, 1843

= Pyrophorus punctatissimus =

Species of beetle

Pyrophorus punctatissimus is a species of click beetle (family Elateridae).

== Description ==
Pyrophorus punctatissimus can reach a length of about 30 millimetres (1.2 in). The basic coloration is dark brown. The antennae are serrate. The pronotum shows a long backward-pointing tooth.

These beetles are bioluminescent by means of two light organs at the posterior corners of the prothorax, and a broad area on the dorsal region of the abdomen, hidden by the wings and seen when flying. Their bioluminescence is similar to that of another group of beetles, the fireflies, although click beetles do not flash, but remain constantly glowing. Also the larvae and the pupae have light organs.

== Distribution ==
This species can be found in Bolivia, Argentina, Brazil, Paraguay, Uruguay and Cuba.
