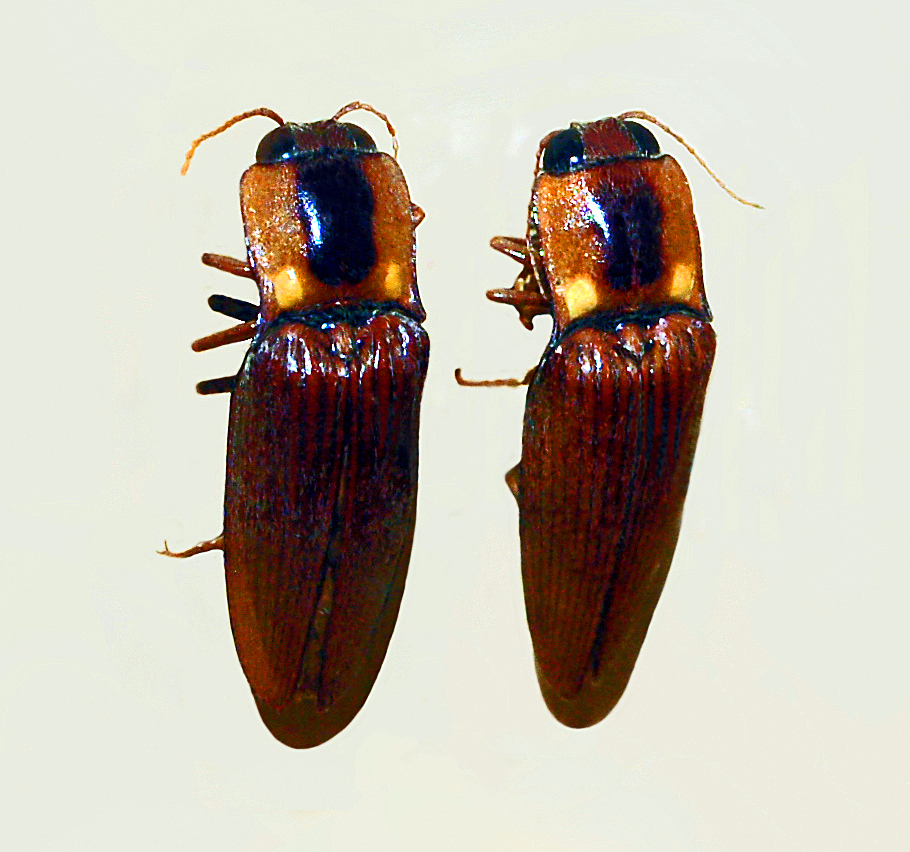
- Mounted specimens from Argentina

Scientific classification
- Kingdom: Animalia
- Phylum: Arthropoda
- Clade: Pancrustacea
- Class: Insecta
- Order: Coleoptera
- Suborder: Polyphaga
- Infraorder: Elateriformia
- Family: Elateridae
- Tribe: Pyrophorini
- Genus: Pyrearinus
- Species: P. candelarius

Binomial name
- Pyrearinus candelarius (Germar, 1841)

Synonyms
- Pyrophorus candelarius Germar, 1841; Pyrophorus diffusus Germar, 1841

= Pyrearinus candelarius =

Species of beetle

Pyrearinus candelarius is a species of click beetle in the family Elateridae.

== Description ==
The basic coloration is dark brown. The eyes are large and the pronotum is yellowish or pale brown, with a blackish area in the middle and small backward-pointing teeth. These beetles are bioluminescent by means of two luminescent light organs at the posterior corners of the prothorax, emitting green light, and a large abdominal area on the first segment, emitting yellow light. They emit light continuously and do not flash. The eggs and pupae are also bioluminescent.

== Distribution ==
This species can be found in Argentina and Brazil.
