= Opselater =

Scientific classification
- Kingdom: Animalia
- Phylum: Arthropoda
- Clade: Pancrustacea
- Class: Insecta
- Order: Coleoptera
- Suborder: Polyphaga
- Infraorder: Elateriformia
- Family: Elateridae
- Tribe: Pyrophorini
- Genus: Opselater; Costa, 1975

Type species
- Elater pyrophanus Illiger, 1807

Species
- 8; see text

Genus of beetles

Opselater is a genus of click beetle (family Elateridae). They are one of several genera in the tribe Pyrophorini, all of which are bioluminescent. This genus was established by Cleide Costa in 1975. After a revision of the genus by Simone Policena Rosa, she stated some members of this genus are polyphyletic with Lygelater bifossulatus (Candèze, 1865), which discouraged her from establishing any new genus in this part of Pyrophorini due to alternative resolutions and ambiguity.

== Description ==
Small; dark-brown. Pubescence short, dense yellowish or grey. Eyes in males are slightly more developed than in females. Front prominent. Antennae reaching the hind angles of the prothorax, serrate from the fourth segment onwards; the third segment is a little longer than the second, the two together are the same length as the fourth. Prothorax slightly convex, punctures variable. Luminous spots are small, lateral, flat and visible also in the proepisternum. Mesosternal cavity sinusoidal and a little raised behind. Metacoxal plates little enlarged inwardly. Abdominal luminous organ small and lamellate. Elytral sides subparallel and rounded to apices. Male genitalia: median lobe very enlarged at the middle, with or without minute cuticular scales. Female genitalia: bursa copulatrix more or less spiraled, with long spines; accessory glands well developed; spermatheca well developed and median oviduct with sclerotized plates.

== Range ==
Opselater is mainly distributed in the Atlantic forest and some species are apparently disjunct.

== List of species ==
The following 8 species are recognized by Rosa (2004) (with each type locality given):

- Opselater costae Rosa, 2004 - Linhares, Espírito Santo, Brazil
- Opselater hebes (Germar, 1841) - São João del-Rei, Minas Gerais, Brazil
- Opselater helvolus (Germar, 1841) - Bahia, Brazil
- Opselater lucens (Illiger, 1807) - Bahia, Brazil
- Opselater melanurus (Candèze, 1863) - Cayenne, French Guiana
- Opselater pyrophanus (Illiger, 1807) - Bahia, Brazil
- Opselater quadraticollis (Blanchard, 1843) - Santa Cruz Department, Bolivia
- Opselater succinus Costa, 1980 - Bahia, Brazil
