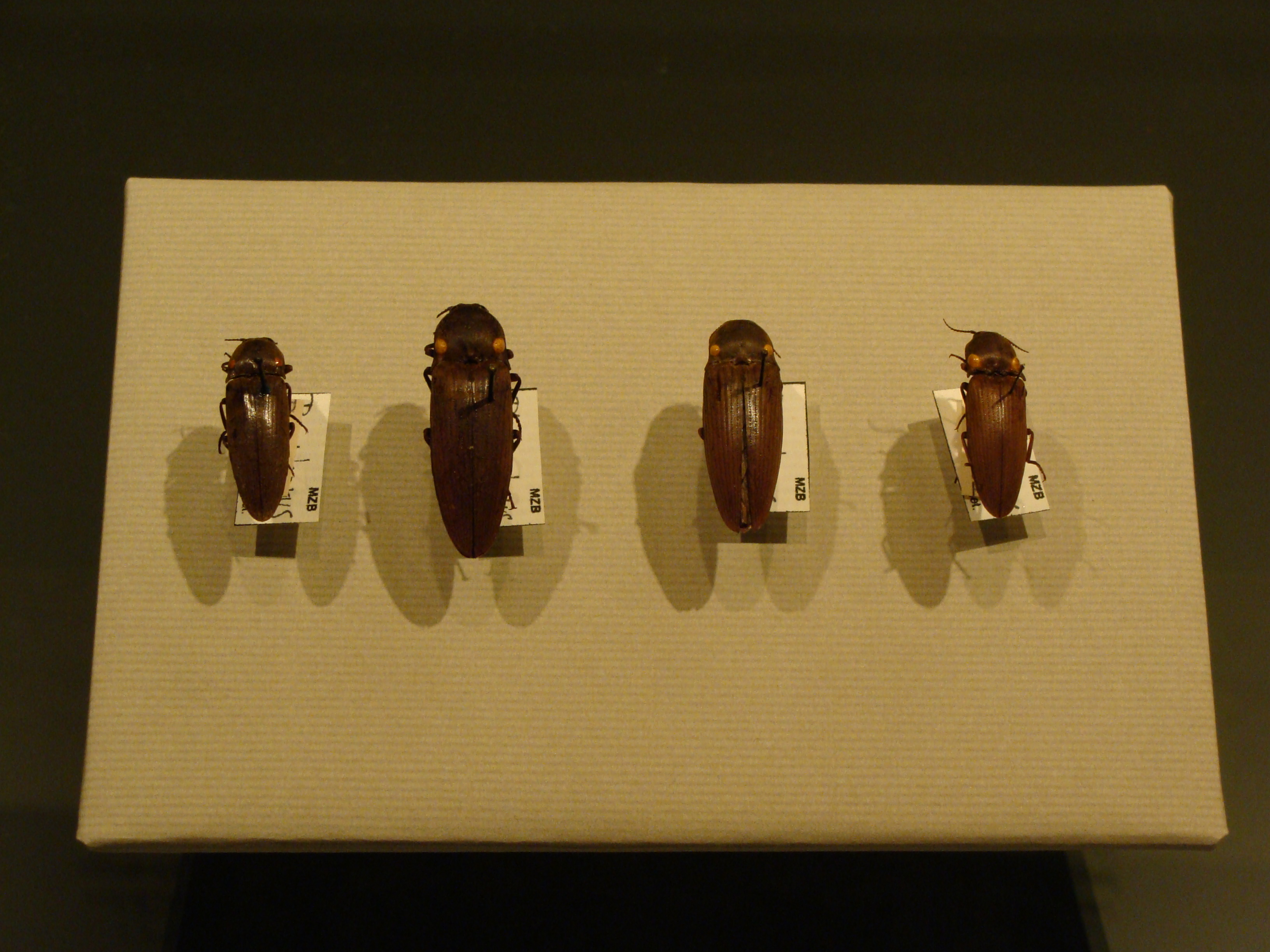

Scientific classification
- Kingdom: Animalia
- Phylum: Arthropoda
- Clade: Pancrustacea
- Class: Insecta
- Order: Coleoptera
- Suborder: Polyphaga
- Infraorder: Elateriformia
- Family: Elateridae
- Tribe: Pyrophorini
- Genus: Ignelater
- Species: I. luminosus

Binomial name
- Ignelater luminosus (Illiger, 1807)

Synonyms
- Elater luminosus Illiger, 1807; Pyrophorus pyralis Germar, 1841; Pyrophorus luminosus (Illiger, 1807)

= Ignelater luminosus =

Species of beetle

Ignelater luminosus is a bioluminescent species of click beetle native to the island of Puerto Rico, one of several Caribbean species in the genus Ignelater that are known as cucubanos. Cucubanos are often confused with fireflies, which are in a different family (Lampyridae), but they emit light from the thorax, unlike true fireflies. Their paired prothorax light organs and single light organ on the anterior surface of the abdomen gives the appearance of two "headlights" and one "backlight", which it can turn off independently.

Because light pollution interferes with their reproduction, they prefer rural areas without much development.

Locations known to be its habitat are the rural areas and outskirts of the city of Adjuntas, located in the mountains.

They average about 1 in (25 mm) in length.

In Puerto Rico, true fireflies are called cucullos, some species of which are native to Puerto Rico. Cucubanos average half an inch in length. The color of both of these insects' lights is bright green.

The genome of Ignelater luminosus was sequenced in 2018.
