= Teenage Mutant Ninja Turtles: Out of the Shadows (soundtrack) =

Teenage Mutant Ninja Turtles: Out of the Shadows (Music from the Motion Picture)

Film score by Steve Jablonsky
- Released: June 3, 2016
- Genre: Film score
- Length: 68:51
- Label: Paramount Music
- Producer: Steve Jablonsky

Steve Jablonsky chronology
Keanu (2016)	Teenage Mutant Ninja Turtles: Out of the Shadows (2016)	Deepwater Horizon (2016)

Teenage Mutant Ninja Turtles: Out of the Shadows (Music from the Motion Picture) is the soundtrack album to the 2016 film of the same name, which is the sequel to Teenage Mutant Ninja Turtles (2014). The album features the original score composed by Steve Jablonsky and was released on June 3, 2016 by Paramount Music.

== Background ==
The original score for Out of the Shadows was written by Steve Jablonsky, who replaced Brian Tyler from the first film and was recommended by the film's executive producer Michael Bay, whom Jablonsky had collaborated in most of the Transformers film series. Like his other projects, Jablonsky would score for the film before eight to ten months, but as the film "was CGI-heavy" he felt it as extremely challenging, since "the visuals coming in late made it challenging for an additional reason—almost nine times out of ten, the music doesn't fit the scenes or sequences when post-production is finished, which would necessitate for re-scoring the film".

Jablonsky played music for the titular theme for the crew members, which they liked it and taking the cues, he used them in multiple ways, including the main title theme. He added that "there aren't many things more lighter and fun. Even when they're in the middle of a life-and-death action scene, they're still cracking jokes, so I don't want to take the music too seriously" as the music for the Transformers series being "dark and heavy", resulting him to write fun music.

On the film, Jablonsky said "the way that they shot the opening and designed this new Turtles adventure was very dramatic – it is all about the city of New York, and the Turtles, and these energetic helicopter shots, all following the brothers on this big mission. There's a build-up to something you think will be huge, but actually, they're just going to see a Knicks game. And we knew that right up front. We saw this as a big theme moment, and a chance to set up the Turtles – who are important to the city – and do something bold, and high-energy, but still very fun."

Mexican boy band CD9 performed the updated version of the original show's theme song for the film. The album was released on June 3, 2016 by Paramount Music.

== Reception ==
Jonathan Broxton of Movie Music UK wrote "Steve Jablonsky's music isn't high art, nor is it meant to be. But what it does do is accompany one of the most ludicrous comic book creations of all time, and successfully provide a coherent musical structure, with themes and motifs, emotional catharsis, and the right amount of energy so that you can almost – almost – take all of this seriously." James Southall of Movie Wave wrote "It's enjoyable music, providing the kind of in-the-moment highs you get from fast food. What draws it back is that 70 minutes is too long for fast food – a large number of the album's 22 tracks are essentially constructed the same way, a few bars of ominous doom before action music (either light or dark) bursts forth, one of the anthemic themes plays, it climaxes a couple of minutes later and then starts again in the next track. That makes it have the feel of one of those curious trailer music albums – a classier version, but not exactly music for the ages. It's fun, just not lasting fun, the themes are good but not developed, just repeated." Germain Lussier of Gizmodo criticised the film's music, saying "The score by Steve Jablonsky sounds almost identical to his score from the first Transformers film and, if you happen to notice that, it creates a huge disconnect. The Turtles deserve their own musical identity and this score fails to do that in a big, big way. Every time the music crescendos to an emotional moment, I felt like I was watching a different movie."

== Track listing ==
No.	Title	Length
1.	"Squirrel Formation"	3:02
2.	"Shredder"	3:38
3.	"Tartaruga Brothers"	3:00
4.	"Baxter Stockman"	2:25
5.	"Shredder Escape"	6:27
6.	"Krang"	5:01
7.	"Turtle Power"	2:30
8.	"Transformation"	3:11
9.	"Foot Clan Chase"	3:05
10.	"Casey Jones"	2:28
11.	"Become Human"	1:48
12.	"The Falcon"	3:04
13.	"Jump!"	5:16
14.	"Launch the Beam"	1:10
15.	"Technodrome Assembles"	1:53
16.	"Just One Sip"	4:42
17.	"Toy Chest"	2:26
18.	"Turtles Meet Krang"	4:18
19.	"Fight on the Technodrome"	2:13
20.	"Close the Portal"	2:34
21.	"Brothers"	2:51
22.	"Half Shell"	1:49
Total length:		68:51

== Personnel ==
Credits adapted from CD liner notes.

- All music composed, produced, programmed and mixed by – Steve Jablonsky
- Recorded by – Kevin Globerman, Lori Castro
- Mastered by – Patricia Sullivan
- Edited by – Alex Gibson, Carlton Kaller, Kevin McKeever
- Music librarian – Booker White

Instruments

- Cello – Andrew Shulman, Armen Ksajikian, Cecilia Tsan, Christina Soule, Dane Little, Dennis Karmazyn, Eric Byers, Erika Duke-Kirkpatrick, Evgeny Tonkha, George Kim Scholes, Giovanna Clayton, Jacob Braun, John Walz, Paula Hochhalter, Peter Myers, Simone Vitucci, Stan Sharp, Steve Erdody, Steve Richards, Suzie Katayama, Timothy Landauer, Timothy Loo, Trevor Handy, Vanessa Freebairn-Smith, Xiaodan Zheng
- Contrabass – Bart Samolis, Christian Kollgaard, David Parmeter, Drew Dembowski, Edward Meares, Gabriel Golden, Geoffrey Osika, Michael Valerio, Neil Garber, Nico Carmine Abondolo, Nicolas Philippon, Oscar Hidalgo, Stephen Dress, Thomas Harte, Timothy Eckert
- Guitar – Tom Strahle
- Horn – Allen Fogle, Amy Rhine, Amy M. Sanchez, Benjamin Jaber, Danielle Ondarza, David Everson, Dylan Hart, Ethan Bearman, Jonathan N. Johnson, Katelyn Faraudo, Laura Brenes, Mark Adams, Phillip Edward Yao, Steven Becknell, Teag Reaves
- Percussion – Brian Kilgore, Jon Jablonsky
- Trombone – Alex Iles, Bill Reichenbach, Craig Gosnell, Phillip Keen, Steven Holtman
- Trumpet – Barry Perkins, Daniel Rosenboom, Jon Lewis, Rob Schaer, Thomas Hooten
- Tuba – Doug Tornquist, Gary Hickman
- Viola – Alma Fernandez, Andrew Duckles, Brian Dembow, Darrin McCann, David Walther, John Zach Dellinger, Keith Greene, Laura Pearson, Luke Maurer, Matthew Funes, Meredith Crawford, Michael Whitson, Pamela Jacobson, Robert Brophy, Scott Hosfeld, Shawn Mann, Thomas Diener, Victoria Miskolczy, Victor De Almeida
- Violin – Alyssa Park, Amy Hershberger, Ana Landauer, Andrew Bulbrook, Benjamin Powell, Benjamin Jacobson, Bruce Dukov, Caroline Campbell, Carrie Kennedy, Charlie Bisharat, Darius Campo, Erik Arvinder, Eun-Mee Ahn, Grace Oh, Helen Nightengale, Irina Voloshina, Jacqueline Brand, Jay Rosen, Jessica Guideri, Joel Pargman, Josefina Vergara, Julie Rogers, Katie Sloan, Katia Popov, Kevin Connolly, Kevin Kumar, Lisa Liu, Lisa Sutton, Lorand Lokuszta, Lorenz Gamma, Luanne Homzy, Lucia Micarelli, Maia Jasper, Marc Sazer, Maria Newman, Maya Magub, Michelle Hassler, Natalie Leggett, Neel Hammond, Neil Samples, Phillip Levy, Radu Pieptea, Rafael Rishik, Roberto Cani, Roger Wilkie, Sarah Thornblade, Serena McKinney, Shalini Vijayan, Sharon Jackson, Songa Lee, Tamara Hatwan, Tereza Stanislav, Tiffany Yi Hu

Orchestra

- Orchestration – Corey Jackson, David Fleming, Elizabeth Finch, Gary Dworetsky, Jay Flood, Larry Rench, Penka Kouneva
- Orchestra conductor – James T. Sale
- Orchestra contractor – Peter Rotter, Ashley K. Olauson
- Concertmaster – Julie Ann Gigante
- Choir conductor and contractor – Jasper Randall

Vocals

- Alto vocals – Amy Fogerson, Jennifer Haydn-Jones, Jessica Rotter, Lesley Leighton, Niké St. Clair, Sarah Lynch
- Bass vocals – Abdiel Gonzalez, Dylan Gentile, Edward Levy, James Hayden, Reid Bruton, William Kenneth Goldman
- Soprano vocals – Anna Schubert, Elissa Johnston, Elyse Willis, Hayden Eberhart, Suzanne Waters, Tamara Bevard
- Tenor vocals – Arnold Geis, Gerald White, Matthew Brown, Michael Lichtenauer, Shawn Kirchner, Todd Strange
