= The Hunt (2015 TV series) =

- Series title card from BBC broadcast
- Genre: Nature documentary
- Narrated by: David Attenborough
- Composer: Steven Price
- Country of origin: United Kingdom
- No. of episodes: 7

Production
- Executive producer: Alastair Fothergill
- Producer: Huw Cordey
- Running time: 60 minutes
- Production companies: Silverback Films; BBC Natural History Unit; The Open University; BBC Worldwide; BBC America; CCTV-9; NDR Naturfilm

Original release
- Network: BBC One; BBC One HD
- Release: 1 November – 13 December 2015

The Hunt is a 2015 British nature documentary series made for BBC Television, first shown in the UK on BBC One and BBC One HD on 1 November 2015. The series is narrated by David Attenborough.

The Hunt takes a detailed, audio-visual study of predator-prey relations—as well as the importance of respective ecosystems within a world facing greater environmental challenges brought about by the impact of the human race. Rather than simply concentrating on 'the blood and guts' of predatory behaviours typical of past documentary series, The Hunt focuses more upon the diverse strategies predators use to catch their food, and also the various evasive techniques prospective prey use to escape death by predator.

Each episode is based in one or more of the planet's key habitats—each of which presents the predators and their prey with often critical seasonal, climatic, and ecological-environmental challenges.

To conclude, the seventh episode examines the state of the planet from the perspective of the top predators and their ever increasingly difficult struggle to survive—and also considers the scientists and conservationists who are determined in their collective fight to protect them.

== Broadcast ==
=== British television ===
The Hunt debuted on British television on 1 November 2015, broadcast on BBC One and BBC One HD, which consisted of total seven episodes.

=== International Release ===
The series was broadcast internationally on BBC Earth channel, and also commercial television channels in various countries, besides.

The series aired in Australia on 3 February 2016 on the Nine Network and in the Republic of Ireland from 5 June 2016 on RTÉ One/2 and RTÉ One HD/2.

In Estonia, the series aired each Saturday from 27 February 2016 and concluded on 9 April 2016 on ETV, locally titled Jaht: Aastaaegade haardes.

In Japan, the series aired from 3 May until 5 May 2016 under BBC Earth monthly programming blocks on WOWOW with the voiceover by Katsumi Chō in Japanese narration.

BBC America announced its first major natural history co-production in United States with a sneak peek review. The series began airing each Sunday from 3 July 2016.

== Episodes ==
No.	Title	Produced by	Original release date	UK viewers (millions)
1	"The Hardest Challenge"	Huw Cordey	1 November 2015	5.80
"The Hardest Challenge" reveals the extraordinary range of techniques predators use to catch their prey—from a leopard using all its powers of stealth to stalk impala in broad daylight to African wild dog, whose tactic is to wear down their prey over long distances; from Nile crocodiles, the planet's most patient predators, to killer whales who use teamwork and intelligence to take on humpback whales. But even with these finely tuned strategies, the outcome is far from certain. Surprisingly, most predators fail most of the time. Also: Blue Wildebeest, Parson's chameleon, Calumma nasutum, Mantis, Darwin's bark spider, Amur falcon and Alate.
2	"In the Grip of the Seasons (Arctic)"	Jonnie Hughes	8 November 2015	5.71
"In the Grip of the Seasons" looks at the challenges of hunting in the Arctic, the most seasonal place on Earth. To a predator, seasonal change is a problem. It means that all the parameters of the hunt—the conditions, the strategies, the prey—change too. The only option for the Arctic's top predators, the Arctic wolf, the Arctic fox and the polar bear, is to continually adapt to their changing world, exploiting the good times and enduring the bad. Also: Earless seal, Arctic hare, Arctic skua, Little auk, Glaucous gull, Muskox and Guillemot Chicks.
3	"Hide and Seek (Forests)"	Jonnie Hughes	15 November 2015	4.87
Forests cover one third of the land surface, and concealed within are over half of the species on Earth. "Hide and Seek" follows tigers, harpy eagles, chimpanzees, army ants and other predators as they rise to the challenge of hunting within the forest—a dense, confusing, three-dimensional world, one in which even finding prey is a maddening task. The prize for succeeding at nature's great game of hide-and-seek is one worth winning. Also: American marten, Eurasian Sparrowhawk, Jay, Portia spider, Spitting spider and Tarsier.
4	"Hunger at Sea (Oceans)"	Hugh Pearson	22 November 2015	5.00
The open ocean is an immense wilderness that covers more than half the surface of our planet, yet for the most part it's a watery desert, largely devoid of macroscopic life. Predators face an endless search to find and catch food, yet these great tracts of ocean are home to some of the most remarkable hunters on the planet. "Hunger at Sea" follows blue whales, sharks, lionfish, tuna, dorado and frigatebirds hunting flying fish, sea lions, dolphins and albatrosses to reveal the strategies they use to hunt for prey in the big blue. The Sargassum fish relies on its camouflage amongst the Sargassum algae to sneak up on prey. In the deep sea, the squid Chiroteuthis attracts prey with bioluminescent lures while the ctenophore genus Beroe hunts other jellyfish. Also: Flying fish, Pelagic red crab, Striped marlin and Sardine.
5	"Nowhere to Hide (Plains)"	Ellen Husain	29 November 2015	4.72
The open arenas of grassland and desert make up half of all land on our planet. In these exposed habitats, predators like cheetahs, bald eagles and lions can usually see their prey. But it works both ways: their prey can see them too. With nothing but open vistas, the element of surprise is hard-won, and predators must make their own opportunities. Also: Guineafowl, Caracal, Honey badger, Termite, Headlight beetle larvae, Snow goose, Cape buffalo, Ethiopian wolf, Mole-rat, Hotrod ants and Antlion larvae.
6	"Race Against Time (Coasts)"	Hugh Pearson	6 December 2015	4.86
The coast is the dynamic border between land and sea; powered by the tides and thrashed by waves, this is a world of continuous change. Opportunities never last long here, so hunters are always in a race against time. The coast is the only place on the planet where predators from air, land and sea come together. Dolphins that leave the safety of the sea to fish, walking octopuses, ingenious monkeys, fishing wolves and the greatest gathering of feeding humpback whales come to the coast to hunt. For all, timing is everything. Also: Soldier crab, Sand bubbler crab, Marine otter, Brown bear, Peregrine falcon, Wader, Patagonian sea lion and Capelin.
7	"Living with Predators (Conservation)"	Rob Sullivan	13 December 2015	4.54
The final episode of the series visits the frontline of the conflict with the world's top predators, meeting the scientists fighting to save them. Crossing five continents and combining landmark natural history footage with real-life human drama, it checks the pulse of the earth's iconic animals, including tigers, harpy eagles, lions, African wild dogs, blue whales, and polar bears. With three quarters of the planet's carnivores now in decline, can people find ways to live with predators before they disappear forever?

== Merchandise ==
=== DVDs and Blu-ray ===
In United Kingdom, DVD (BBCDVD4060) and Blu-ray (BBCBD0315) has been released on 30 November 2015 by BBC Worldwide.

In Australia and New Zealand, DVD and Blu-ray were released by ABC DVD/Village Roadshow on 20 July 2016.

In North America and Canada, the DVD and Blu-ray box sets was released on 6 September 2016 by BBC Worldwide Americas.

=== Books ===
The Hunt accompanies the TV series and was released in hardcover format on 2 November 2015. It is written by Alastair Fothergill and Huw Cordey, with a foreword by David Attenborough. It was published by BBC Books (ISBN 9781849907224).

In the US, the book was released on 14 June 2016 and published by the Yale University Press (ISBN 9780300218060).

=== Open University poster ===
Open Learn University offers a free poster at (http://www.open.edu/openlearn/tv-radio-events/tv/the-hunt#get-your-free-poster)

== Soundtrack ==
The Hunt

Soundtrack album by Steven Price (composer)
- Released: 13 November 2015
- Genres: Soundtrack, Classical music
- Length: 2:29:23
- Label: Sony Music Entertainment
- Producers: BBC Worldwide; BBC Earth

The musical score and songs featured in the series were composed by Steven Price and conducted by Geoffrey Alexander, with the performed by the BBC Concert Orchestra. The soundtrack was released on 13 November 2015.

DISC 1

No.	Title	Length
1.	"A Game of Strategy"	3:17
2.	"Power vs Teamwork"	8:20
3.	"The Cut Line Inconvenience"	4:25
4.	"Fueled Up and Headed South"	3:11
5.	"The Hungry Crocodile"	5:45
6.	"Looking on at What Might Have Been"	3:23
7.	"In the Grip of the Seasons"	2:53
8.	"Melt Waters"	3:22
9.	"All at Sea"	3:49
10.	"Wolves and Hares"	3:58
11.	"Miniature Gliders"	5:08
12.	"Big Game on the Thundra"	5:04
13.	"At First It's a Game"	2:12
14.	"A Sparrowhalk's Tale"	3:56
15.	"Buzzing Jays"	2:03
16.	"Chimps vs Monkeys"	3:39
17.	"The Army Ants"	7:08
Total length:		71:33

DISC 2

No.	Title	Length
1.	"The Blue Whale"	5:12
2.	"Between the Devil and the Deep Blue Sea"	5:19
3.	"Spinner Dolphin Superpod"	1:31
4.	"The Deep"	3:59
5.	"The Bait Ball"	5:11
6.	"Nowhere to Hide"	1:07
7.	"The Honey Badger"	2:53
8.	"Building a Fortress"	4:52
9.	"Lions and Buffalo"	6:04
10.	"Red Hot Ants"	6:37
11.	"Etosha Lions"	6:10
12.	"Race Against Time"	1:19
13.	"No Ordinary Octopus"	3:41
14.	"Living on a Calorific Knife Edge"	3:11
15.	"Sea Lions and Killer Whales"	6:11
16.	"Wolves and Bears"	5:07
17.	"Hunting Humpbacks"	4:46
18.	"The Lions Theme"	4:40
Total length:		77:50
