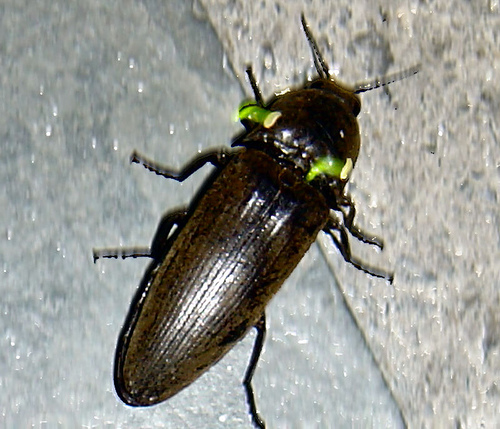

Scientific classification
- Kingdom: Animalia
- Phylum: Arthropoda
- Clade: Pancrustacea
- Class: Insecta
- Order: Coleoptera
- Suborder: Polyphaga
- Infraorder: Elateriformia
- Family: Elateridae
- Tribe: Pyrophorini
- Genus: Pyrophorus; Illiger, 1809
- Species: P. nyctophanus

Binomial name
- Pyrophorus nyctophanus (pars) Germar, 1841

Synonyms
- Pyrophorus divergens Eschscholtz, 1829

= Pyrophorus nyctophanus =

Species of beetle

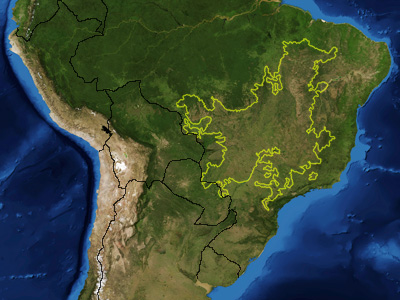
Extent of Cerrado in Brazil

Pyrophorus nyctophanus (=fire-bearing night-shiner), a.k.a. headlight beetle or carbunco, is a species of click beetle that occurs on the cerrado of Brazil. Its luminescent larvae are either soil-dwelling or found in tunnels in the outer layers of termite mounds, and are active predators of other insects during summer nights when their regulated glow acts as a lure to their prey. The adult beetles, though, are phytophagous, feeding on decomposing plant matter and exudates, and are attracted to artificial light. Pupae of this genus also luminesce.

"Headlight beetles are large click beetles notable among click beetles in their unique ability to produce light. An intense glow emanates from two round luminescent organs on the prothorax and a broad area on the underside of the first abdominal segment. In flight both sexes produce a brilliant blue-green streak of light that dazzles the onlooker." -Charles Leonard Hogue

Some 26 species of Pyrophorus are found from southern Mexico to Argentina and the West Indies. The brightness of their light is legendary and Peter Martyr d'Anghiera in his 1516 "History of the West Indies" notes that the Islanders tied a few beetles to their toes to light their way at night, but also spreads the myth that adult beetles feed on mosquitoes. Humboldt recorded that he read quite comfortably at night by the glow of a dozen beetles. West Indians also applied a paste made from crushed beetles to their faces and hands to appear ghostly in the dark.
