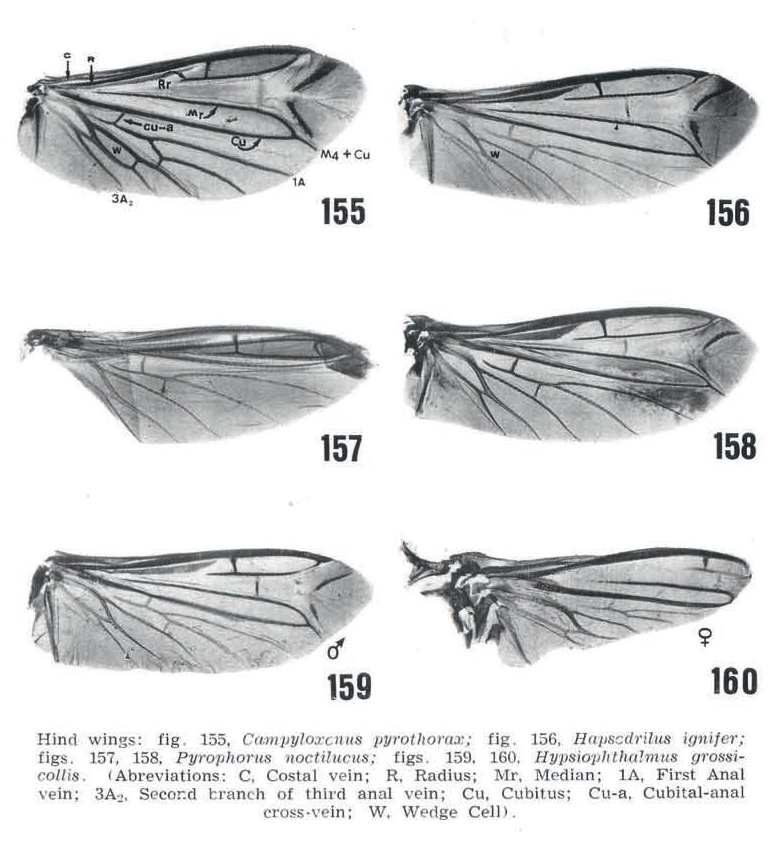
- Hind-wings of Neotropic elaterids; ones of Campyloxenus pyrothorax (fig. 155) have 'wedge cell' (annotated as W), which those of members of the tribe Pyrophorini (subfamily Agrypninae; figs. 156–160) lack.

Scientific classification
- Kingdom: Animalia
- Phylum: Arthropoda
- Clade: Pancrustacea
- Class: Insecta
- Order: Coleoptera
- Suborder: Polyphaga
- Infraorder: Elateriformia
- Family: Elateridae
- Subfamily: Campyloxeninae; Costa, 1975

Genera
- Campyloxenus Fairmaire & Germain, 1860; Malalcahuello Arias-Bohart, 2015

= Campyloxeninae =

Subfamily of click beetles

Campyloxeninae is a subfamily of click beetles in the family Elateridae. It was established by Cleide Costa in 1975 with the genus Campyloxenus, former member of the tribe Pyrophorini under the subfamily Agrypninae, as the only member. In 2015, genus Malalcahuello was described from Chile as a new member of this subfamily.

== Description ==
Claws without setae near the base; hind wings with wedge cell; female genitalia with stylus and a very elongate baculum.

The features of Campyloxenus pyrothorax Fairmaire & Germain, 1860 (the only member of the genus Campyloxenus) which distinguish it from members of Pyrophorini are as follows:

	Campyloxenus pyrophorax	Pyrophorini
Setae on the claw near the base	Absent	Present
Wedge cell on hind-wings	Present	Absent
Luminous organs	Present only on prothorax	Present on prothorax and/or abdomen
Mesosternal cavity	Almost horizontal	Generally sinusoidal

== Bibliography ==
- Costa, C. (1975). "Systematics and evolution of the tribes Pyrophorini and Heligmini, with description of Campyloxeninae, new subfamily (Coleoptera, Elateridae". Arquivos de Zoologia. 26 (2): 49–190. doi:10.11606/issn.2176-7793.v26i2p49-190.
