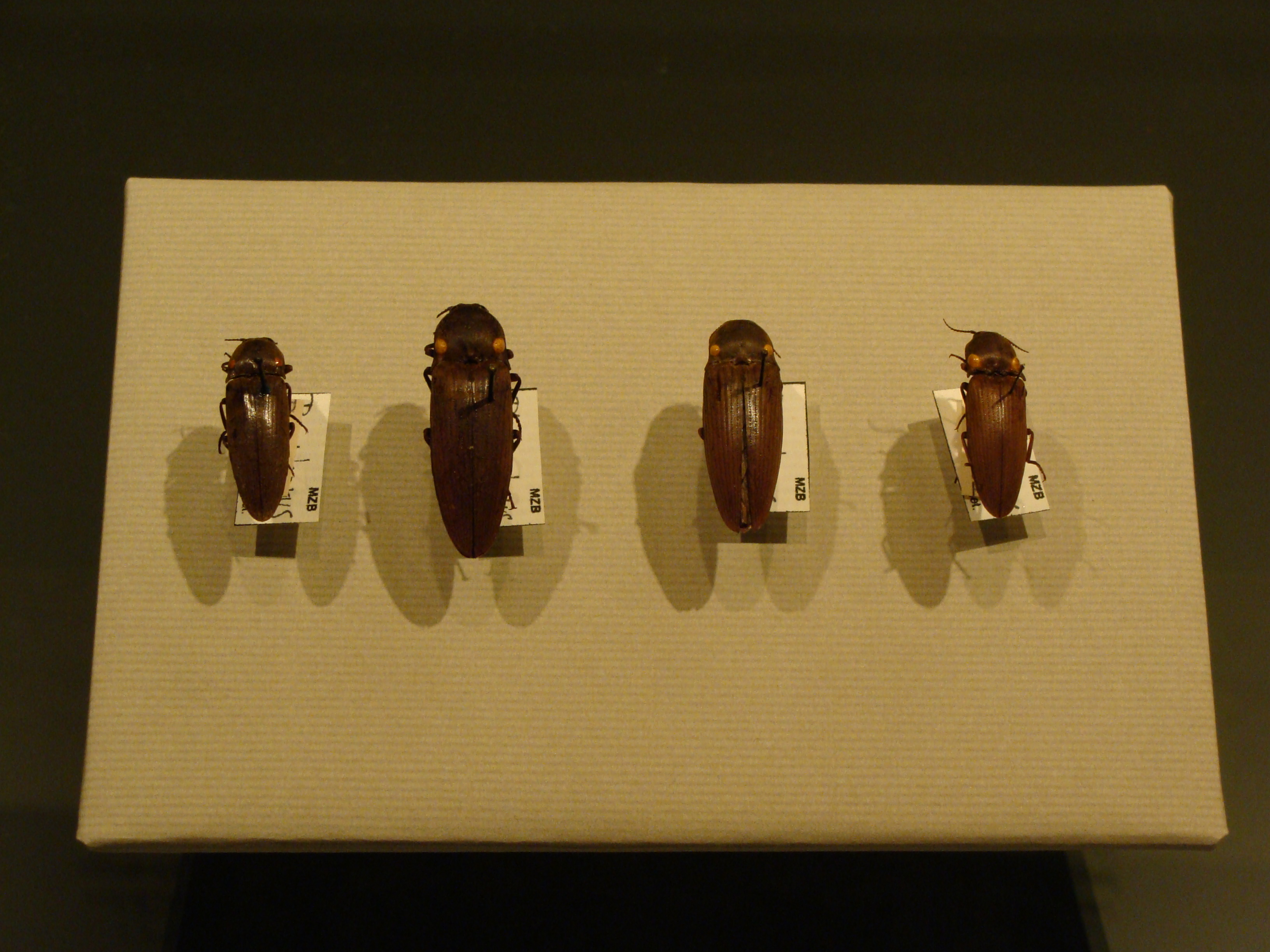
- Ignelater luminosus

Scientific classification
- Domain: Eukaryota
- Kingdom: Animalia
- Phylum: Arthropoda
- Class: Insecta
- Order: Coleoptera
- Suborder: Polyphaga
- Infraorder: Elateriformia
- Family: Elateridae
- Subfamily: Agrypninae
- Tribe: Pyrophorini
- Genus: Ignelater; Costa, 1975

Type species
- Pyrophorus (Stilpnus) havaniensis Laporte, 1840

Species
- 10; see text

Synonyms
- Stilpnus Laporte, 1840

= Ignelater =

Genus of beetles

Ignelater is a genus of click beetle (family Elateridae). They are one of several genera in the tribe Pyrophorini, all of which are bioluminescent. This genus was established by Cleide Costa in 1975. Most of the species were formerly in the genus Pyrophorus.

== Description ==
Slender; reddish-brown. Pubescence short, fine, more or less dense, yellowish or grey. Eyes slightly prominent in male. Front not prominent, more or less concave in the middle. Antennae elongate, surpassing the hind angles of the prothorax; third segment slightly longer than second, more or less triangular, the two together smaller than fourth. Prothorax slightly convex. Luminous spots lateral, rounded, slightly convex and visible beneath on the proepisternum. Abdominal luminous organ small and lamellate. Male genitalia: median lobe with or without median tubercles; with minute cuticular scales and long spines. Female genitalia: bursa copulatrix well spiraled, median oviduct with a pair of sclerotized plates.

== List of species ==
Given below is a species list with type localities and references where each combination first appeared.

- Ignelater brunneus Costa, 1980 - Cuba
- Ignelater caudatus (Champion, 1896) - Costa Rica
- Ignelater dominicanensis Fernández García & Lozada Piña, 2002 - Dominican Republic
- Ignelater glaesum Costa, 1980 - Cayman Islands
- Ignelater havaniensis (Laporte, 1840) - Havana, Cuba
- Ignelater inaguensis Rosa, 2010 - Bahamas
- Ignelater luminosus (Illiger, 1807) - "America"
- Ignelater novoae Fernández García & Lozada Piña, 1998 - Cuba
- Ignelater paveli Fernández García & Lozada Piña, 1998 - Cuba
- Ignelater phosphoreus (Linnaeus, 1758) - "America" (Lectotype: Cayenne, French Guiana)
