= Spiny rat =

Spiny rat may refer to:

- Echimyidae, the Neotropical spiny rats, a family of South and Central American caviomorph rodents

or any of the following genera or species of tropical or subtropical east Asian or Australasian rats of subfamily Murinae:

- Echiothrix, a rat genus from Sulawesi
- Maxomys, a genus of Southeast Asian rats
- Large New Guinea spiny rat (Rattus praetor), a rat species from New Guinea and nearby islands
- Small spiny rat or Stein's rat (Rattus steini), a rat species from New Guinea
- Mindanao spiny rat (Tarsomys echinatus) from Mindanao
- Tokudaia, a rat genus from the Ryukyu Islands
