= Campyloxenus =

Scientific classification
- Kingdom: Animalia
- Phylum: Arthropoda
- Class: Insecta
- Order: Coleoptera
- Suborder: Polyphaga
- Infraorder: Elateriformia
- Family: Elateridae
- Subfamily: Campyloxeninae
- Genus: Campyloxenus; Fairmaire & Germain, 1860
- Species: C. pyrothorax

Binomial name
- Campyloxenus pyrothorax Fairmaire & Germain, 1860

Genus of click beetles

Campyloxenus is a bioluminescent genus of click beetles in the family Elateridae, and had been the sole member of the subfamily Campyloxeninae, until another monotypic genus Malalcahuello was described from Chile in 2015 as its new member. There is one described species in Campyloxenus, Campyloxenus pyrothorax, from southwestern Chile and Argentina.

== Description ==
Black with a reddish pronotum. Pubescence long, dense, bristly and brownish. Eyes very small. Front carinate. Antennae elongate, surpassing the hind angles of the prothorax, serrate from the fourth segment onwards; second segment short, third elongate, two times longer than second and of the same length as the fourth. Prothorax subquadrate, slightly convex. Luminous spots occupying the entire middle region on each side of the prothorax and visible beneath on the proepisternum. Mesosternal cavity almost horizontal. Metacoxal plate very narrow and of the same width throughout. Abdominal luminous organ absent. Male genitalia: median lobe narrow and straight; lateral lobes elongate, with few hairs. Female genitalia: stylus and baculum elongate, eighth urosternite elongate inwardly; bursa copulatrix not spiraled, with a few sclerotized scales. Sexual dimorphism accentuated; females with small eyes, more convex and more rounded prothorax; antennae shorter.
