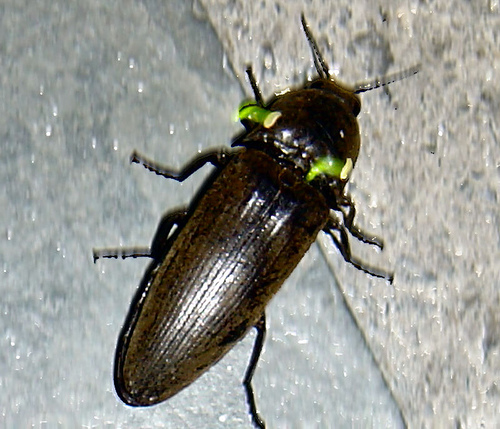
- Pyrophorus noctilucus

Scientific classification
- Domain: Eukaryota
- Kingdom: Animalia
- Phylum: Arthropoda
- Class: Insecta
- Order: Coleoptera
- Suborder: Polyphaga
- Infraorder: Elateriformia
- Family: Elateridae
- Subfamily: Agrypninae
- Tribe: Pyrophorini
- Genus: Pyrophorus; Billberg, 1820

Species
- See text

= Pyrophorus (beetle) =

Genus of beetles

Pyrophorus (also known as fire beetles) is a genus of click beetle (family Elateridae). They are one of several genera in the tribe Pyrophorini, all of which are bioluminescent. Their bioluminescence is similar to that of another group of beetles, the fireflies, although click beetles do not flash, but remain constantly glowing (though they can control the intensity; for example, they become brighter when touched by a potential predator). They have two luminescent spots at the posterior corners of the pronotum, and another brighter light organ on the most-anterior surface of the ventral abdomen. This light organ is even brighter and can only be seen when in flight. Bioluminescent click beetles are found throughout tropical, subtropical and temperate America. Species from Texas, Florida, Puerto Rico, and Cuba are now in different genera in the tribe Pyrophorini, such as Deilelater and Ignelater.

Adult Pyrophorus beetles feed on pollen and sometimes small insects, such as aphids or scale insects. Their larvae feed on various plant materials and invertebrates, including the larvae of other beetles. Eggs are luminous and are deposited either on or in the soil. Mature larvae and pupae are also luminous. They grow slowly and pupate after an uncertain period of time, but perhaps several years after hatching.

Pyrophorus nyctophanus larvae live in tunnels in the outer layers of termite mounds on the cerrado of Brazil. During summertime they glow at night, attracting prey in the form of other insects.

== List of species ==
- Pyrophorus angustus Blanchard, 1843
- Pyrophorus avunculus Costa, 1972
- Pyrophorus canaliculatus Eschscholtz, 1829
- Pyrophorus carinatus Eschscholtz, 1829
- Pyrophorus clarus Germar, 1841
- Pyrophorus cucujus Illiger, 1807
- Pyrophorus dulcifer Costa, 1972
- Pyrophorus evexus Costa, 1972
- Pyrophorus expeditus Costa, 1972
- Pyrophorus foveolatus Germar, 1841
- Pyrophorus ignigenus Germar, 1841
- Pyrophorus indistinctus Germar, 1841
- Pyrophorus indulcatus Costa, 1972
- Pyrophorus ingens Costa, 1972
- Pyrophorus jocundus Costa, 1972
- Pyrophorus limbatus Candèze, 1863
- Pyrophorus lucidus Candèze, 1863
- Pyrophorus magnus Costa, 1972
- Pyrophorus melitus Costa, 1972
- Pyrophorus mellifluus Costa, 1972
- Pyrophorus mutatus Candèze, 1893
- Pyrophorus nigropunctatus Drapiez, 1820
- Pyrophorus noctilucus (Linnaeus, 1758)
- Pyrophorus phosphorescens Laporte, 1840
- Pyrophorus pisticus Costa, 1972
- Pyrophorus plagiophthalmus Germar, 1841
- Pyrophorus punctatissimus Blanchard, 1843
- Pyrophorus pyropoecilus Germar, 1841
- Pyrophorus strabus Germar, 1841
- Pyrophorus stupendus Costa, 1972
- Pyrophorus tuberculifer Eschscholtz, 1829
- Pyrophorus validus Costa, 1972
- Pyrophorus veriloquus Costa, 1972

=== Synonyms ===
- Pyrophorus nyctophanus Germar, 1841 = P. phosphorescens Laporte, 1840

=== Excluded taxa ===
- Pyrophorus luciferus Eschscholtz ... nomen nudum
