= James A. Hyslop =

American entomologist

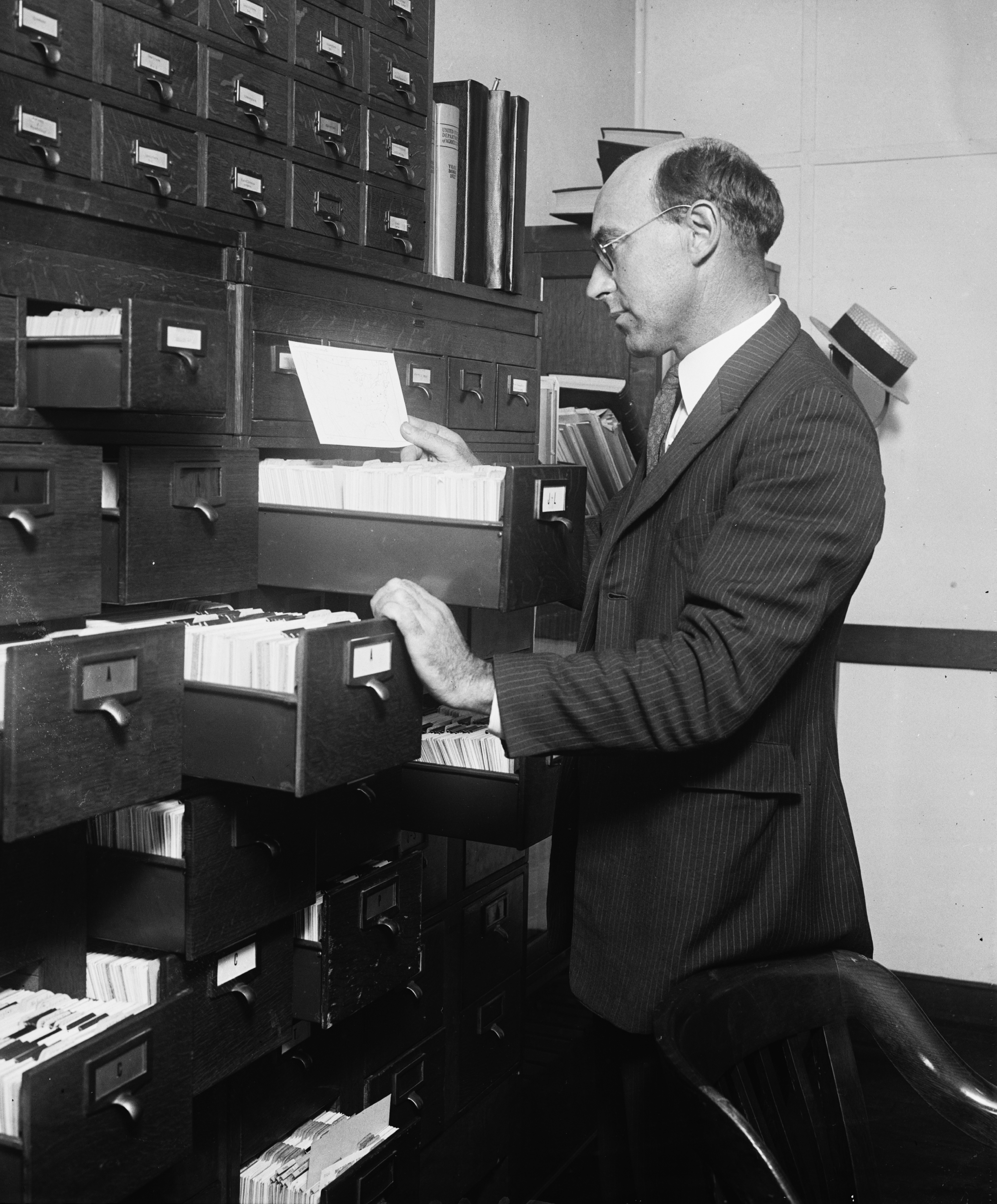
J. A. Hyslop in 1924

James Augustus Hyslop (July 7, 1885 – January 16, 1953) was an American entomologist who founded the Insect Pest Survey of the U.S. Bureau of Entomology and Plant Quarantine.

Hyslop was born in Chicago, Illinois, and grew up in Rutherford, New Jersey. After graduating from Rutherford High School, he earned a B.S. at Massachusetts Agricultural College in 1908 and M.S. at Washington State College in 1911. He joined the U.S. Department of Agriculture in 1907 and led the field station in Hagerstown, Maryland, from 1912 to 1917. He published over 130 articles on entomology and related subjects, and as coleopterist he specialized in the Elateridae.
