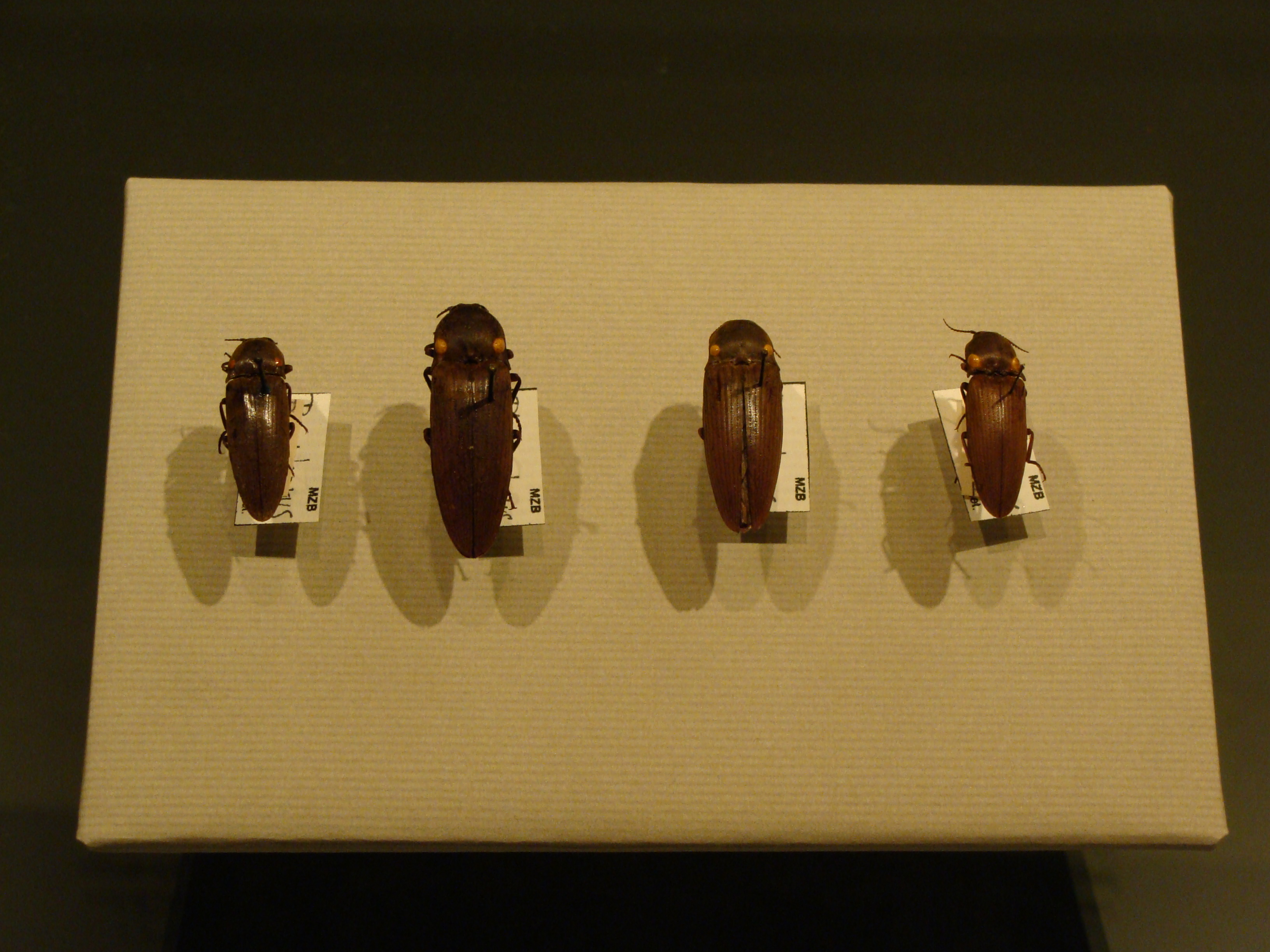
- Ignelater luminosus

Scientific classification
- Kingdom: Animalia
- Phylum: Arthropoda
- Class: Insecta
- Order: Coleoptera
- Suborder: Polyphaga
- Infraorder: Elateriformia
- Family: Elateridae
- Subfamily: Agrypninae
- Tribe: Pyrophorini; Candèze, 1863

= Pyrophorini =

Tribe of beetles

The Pyrophorini are a New World taxonomic tribe within the Elateridae (click beetle) subfamily Agrypninae. Pyrophorini is a tribe of bioluminescent beetles, and includes such genera as Pyrophorus and Ignelater.

It is believed to be monophyletic.

The tribe Anaissini is very closely related to the Pyrophorini (it includes species formerly placed in Pyrophorini); the latter is exclusively bioluminescent, while the former has only some species that are known to be bioluminescent. Another bioluminescent lineage is Campyloxenus pyrothorax (from Chile) in the related monotypic subfamily Campyloxeninae. The Sinopyrophoridae were thought to represent the first bioluminescent elaterids known from Asia, but actually are a newly-recognized bioluminescent beetle family.

== Genera ==
- Cryptolampros Costa, 1975
- Deilelater Costa, 1975
- Fulgeochlizus Costa, 1975
- Hapsodrilus Costa, 1975
- Hifo Candèze, 1882
- Hifoides Schwarz, 1906
- Hypsiophthalmus Latreille, 1834
- Ignelater Costa, 1975
- Lygelater Costa, 1975
- Metapyrophorus Rosa & Costa, 2009
- Noxlumenes Costa, 1975
- Nyctophyxis Costa, 1975
- Opselater Costa, 1975
- Phanophorus Solier, 1851
- Photophorus Candèze, 1863
- Ptesimopsia Costa, 1975
- Pyrearinus Costa, 1975
- Pyrophorus Billberg, 1820
- Pyroptesis Costa, 1975
- Sooporanga Costa, 1975
- Vesperelater Costa, 1975
