= Spine (zoology) =

Rigid needle-like anatomical structures

In a zoological context, spines are hard, needle-like anatomical structures found in both vertebrate and invertebrate species. The spines of most spiny mammals are modified hairs, with a spongy center covered in a thick, hard layer of keratin and a sharp, sometimes barbed tip.

== Occurrence ==
=== Mammals ===
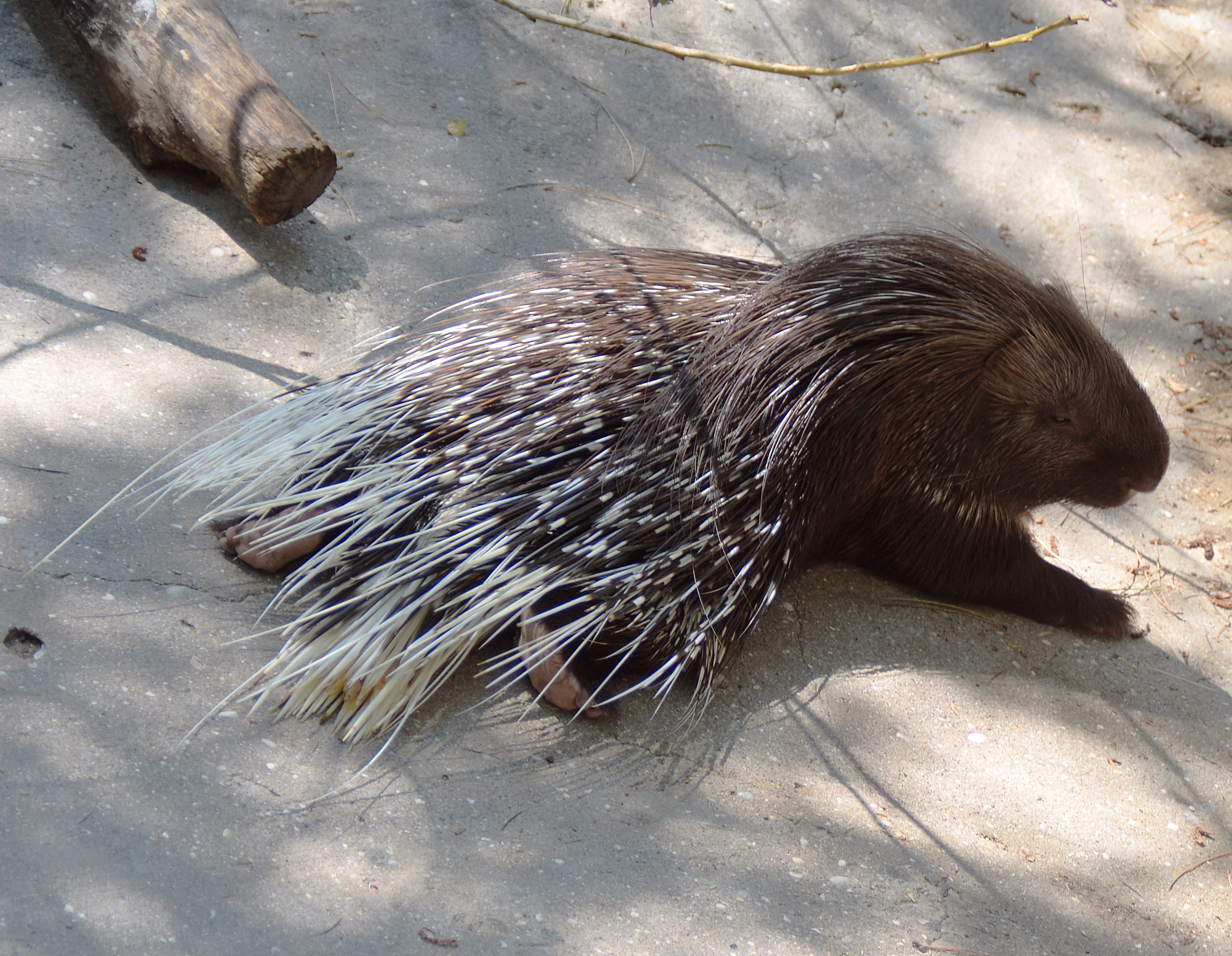
The defensive spines on a porcupine

Spines in mammals include the prickles of hedgehogs, and among rodents, the quills of porcupines (of both the New World and the Old), as well as the prickly fur of spiny mice, spiny pocket mice, and of species of spiny rat. They are also found on afrotherian tenrecs of the family Tenrecinae (hedgehog and streaked tenrecs), marsupial spiny bandicoots, and on echidnas (a monotreme).

An ancient synapsid, Dimetrodon, had extremely long spines on its backbone that were joined together with a web of skin that formed a sail-like structure.

Many mammalian species, like cats and fossas, also have penile spines.

The Mesozoic eutriconodont mammal Spinolestes already displayed spines similar to those of modern spiny mice.

=== Fish ===
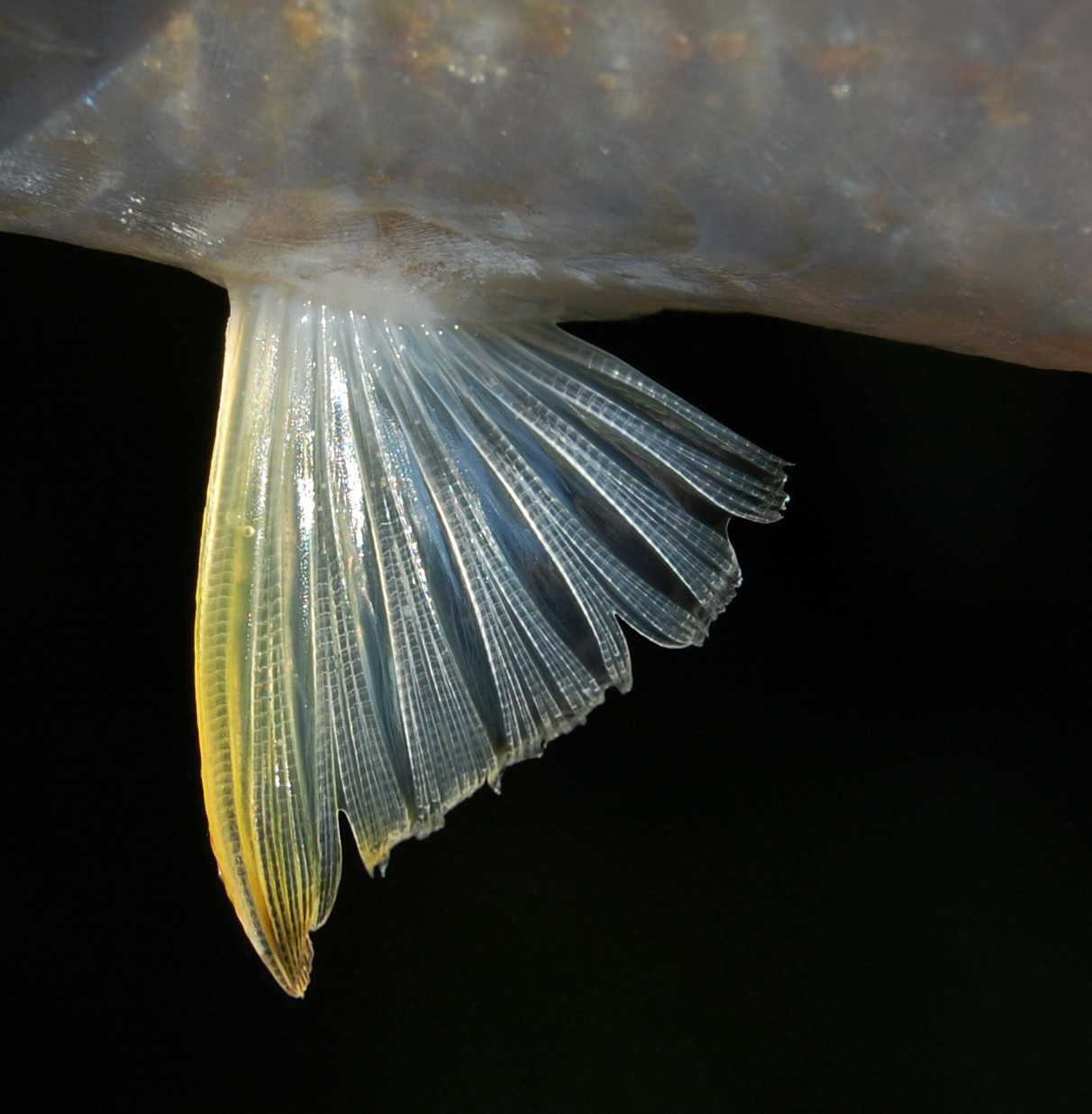
Pelvic fin of a Java barb, a ray-finned fish

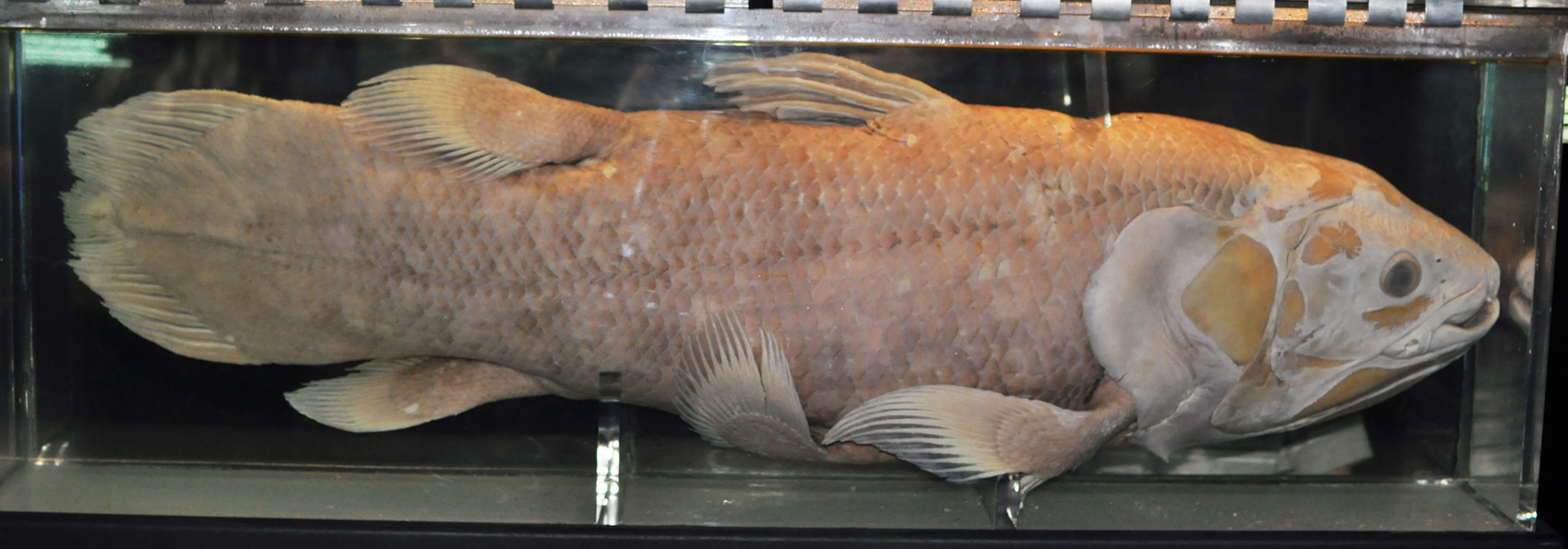
The short fin spines on a coelacanth, a lobe-finned fish

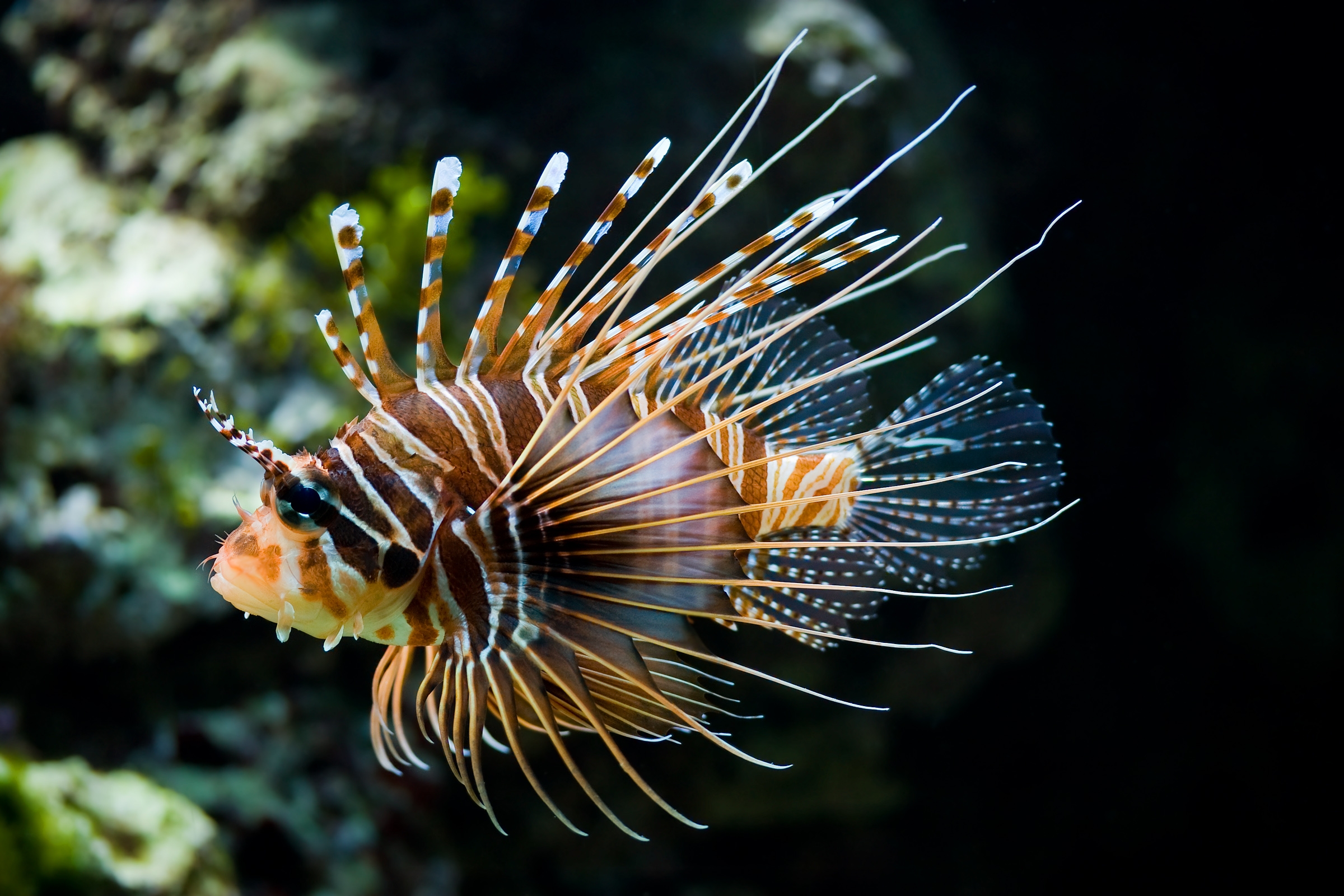
A lionfish, with venomous spines

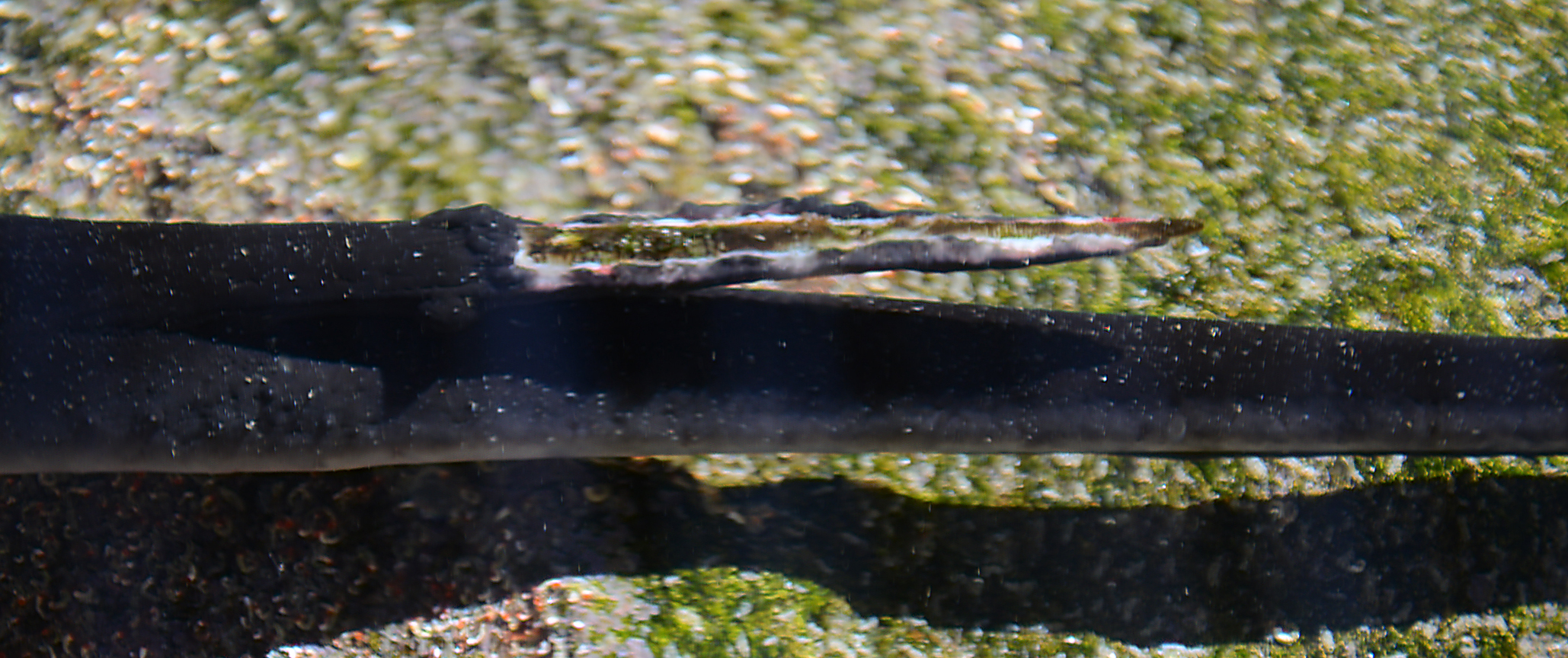
The stinger on a stingray's tail

Spines are found in the fins of most bony fishes, particularly actinopterygians (ray-finned fishes), who have folding fan-like fin made of spreading bony spines called lepidotrichia or "rays" covered by thin stretches of skin.

In the other bony fish clade, the sarcopterygians (lobe-finned fish), the fin spines (if any at all) are significantly shorter and each fin is instead dominated by a muscular stalk ("lobe") with a jointed internal appendicular skeleton. The limbs of tetrapods, who descended from sarcopterygian ancestors, are homologous to the paired pectoral and pelvic fins.

Some fish, such as scorpion fish and lionfish, has prominent sharp, venomous spines for anti-predator defense. The tail stinger on a stingray is also a type of barbed spine modified from dermal denticles.

The acanthodians, an extinct class of ancient fish that are paraphyletic to the cartilaginous fishes, have prominent bony spines in the front (rostral) edges of all fins except the tail. The primary function of these rigid spines are generally presumed to be defensive against predators, but other proposed roles are as cutwaters to reduce drag or as holdfasts against subsurface currents.

=== Invertebrates ===
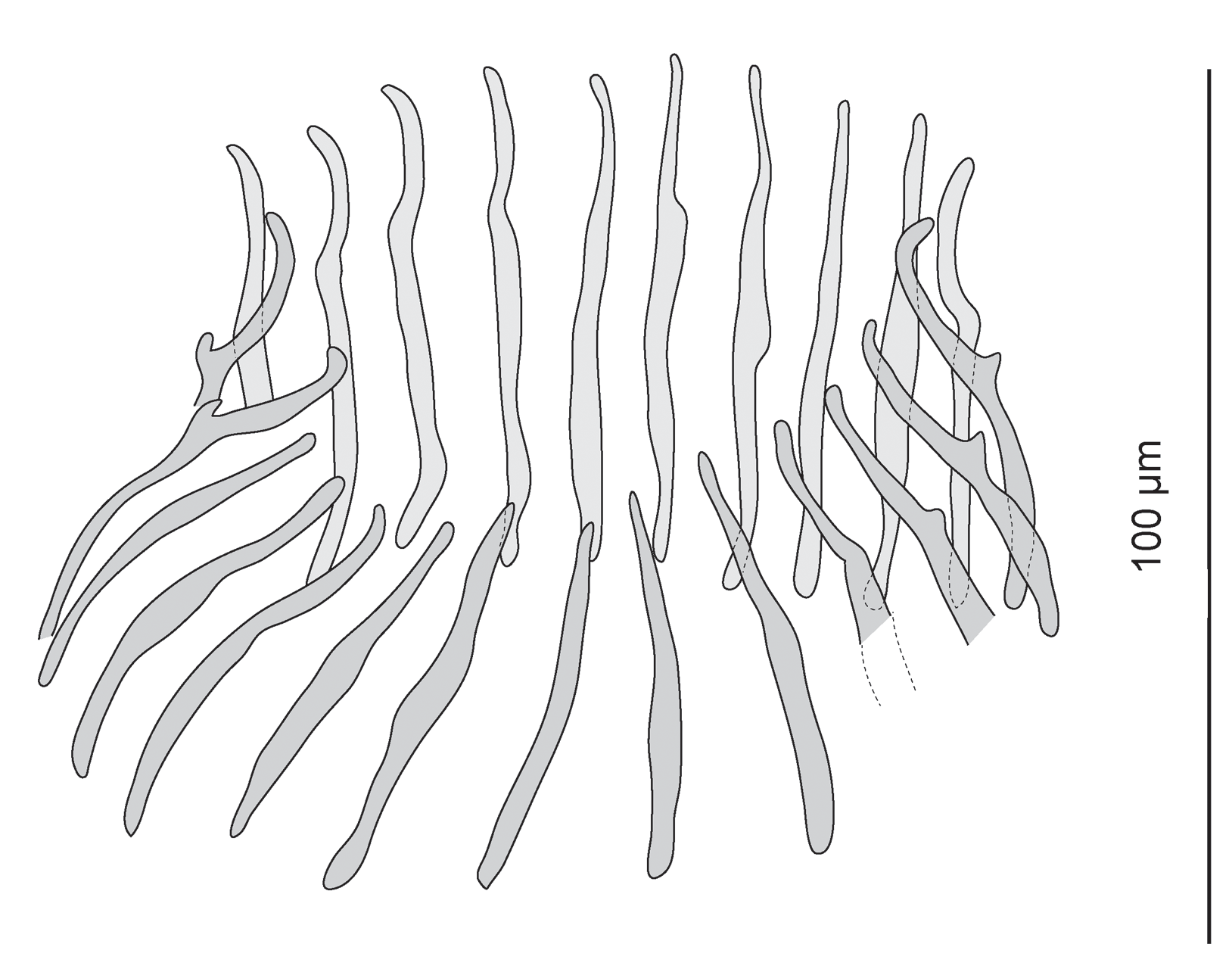
Spines of the copulatory organ on a male parasitic flatworm, Lethacotyle vera

Defensive spines are also found in invertebrate animals, such as sea urchins. They are a feature of the shell of several different species of gastropod and bivalve mollusks, including the venus clam Pitar lupanaria.

Many species of arthropods also have spine-like protrusions on their bodies for defensive purposes. For example, the rostra on many shrimp species form a sharp spine that can be used against predators. The urticating bristles or setae on many caterpillars and New World tarantulas are essentially tiny detachable spines that can cause severe irritation upon contact. Those on the Lonomia caterpillars are venomous and can cause lethal coagulopathy, hemolysis and kidney failure.

Spines are also found in internal organs in invertebrates, such as the copulatory spines in the male or female organs of certain flatworms.

== Function ==
In many cases, spines are a defense mechanism that help protect the animal against potential predators. Because spines are sharp, they can puncture skin and inflict pain and damage which may cause the predator to avoid that species from that point on.

The spine of some animals are capable of injecting venom. In the case of some large species of stingray, a puncture with the barbed spine and the accompanying venom has occasionally been fatal to humans.

Animals such as porcupines are considered aposematic, because their spines warn predators that they are dangerous, and in some cases, potentially toxic. Porcupines rattle their quills as a warning to predators, much like rattlesnakes use their rattles.

== Spine evolution in mammals ==
=== Evolution ===
==== Predation defense ====
Defensive spines in mammals may have evolved due to the need for defense in exposed environments where they are vulnerable to predation. This includes permanent spines like hedgehog prickles and detachable spines like porcupine quills. Because selection acts on phenotype, defensive morphologies are modified from existing forms. Mammalian defensive spines are modified hairs.

===== Trade-off with speed and camouflage =====
Body armor (spines, quills, and dermal plates, etc.) has been linked to lower basal metabolic rates (BMRs). This is consistent with the hypothesis that intermediate-sized mammals who struggle to conceal themselves either develop body armor as defense or evolve to move quickly (necessitating higher BMRs). Mammalian body armor has also been linked to dietary habits, specifically those of insectivorous mammals. Myrmecophagous mammals, mammals which primarily eat ants and termites, typically have lower BMRs and are not as fast-moving. These traits potentially explain why myrmecophagous mammals tend to have body armor. More generally, it has been suggested that because insectivorous mammals are often rooting in the soil with their heads down, they have evolved body armor such as spines that compensates for decreased awareness of predators.

There is a correlation between intermediate-sized mammals (~800g to 9 kg), open habitat, insectivorous diets, and defensive body armor such as spines. Data suggests that intermediate-sized mammals with increased environmental exposure are selected to evolve morphological defenses due to larger size and open habitats. These mammals develop body armor as they're too large to be able to hide easily, but too small to fight effectively. While there is a correlation between open habitats and high morphological defense, it has been found that some species of defended rodents, like spiny rats and porcupines, are more associated with closed, arboreal habitats. It is unclear as to whether the correlation between body armor and insectivorous mammals' lower BMRs is due to lower BMRs necessitating body armor, or body armor allowing an insectivorous lifestyle that reduces BMR.

===== Aposematism =====
Some species' defensive spines have evolved with aposematism, signaling their danger through color. It has been observed that species that have evolved both defensive spines and aposematism have fewer spines, suggesting that aposematism may allow species to reduce the costs associated with producing more appendages.

==== Other theories ====
A hedgehog-specific theory is that hedgehogs' defensive spines evolved as cushions to break their falls from great heights. There is evidence to suggest that hedgehog spines are beneficial in this capacity, but due to natural selection, this is not likely the primary function of hedgehog spines. Mammals may also use spines to make themselves appear larger to predators. Spines have even been hypothesized to be used for communication as they can be used to create noise and aid echolocation.

=== Biomechanics ===
Defensive spines have evolved independently several times in extant mammal taxa and vary in form and secondary function. While not always the case, defensive spines are typically passive puncture tools in contrast to active puncture tools (e.g. teeth and claws). Materials stiffen when under high strain rates, which allows puncture tools to allot more energy to the fracturing of the material during the puncture event. Due to their passivity, defensive spines cannot stiffen the target material for easier puncture, so they have to rely on using as little force as possible for a more effective puncture. Microscopic barbs on the ends of the quills of North American porcupines (Erethizon dorsatum) reduce the force needed to penetrate a subject as well as anchor the quills in the subject, increasing damage. Defensive spines can be used aggressively; many quilled mammals will roll into spikey balls and lunge at predators to impale them, sometimes successfully killing large predators.

While many sea creatures deliver venom through spines, there is little evidence of venomous spines in mammals. However, hedgehogs and tenrecs have been observed possibly coating their spines with toad toxins, increasing the danger of puncture.

=== Correlated evolution ===
Defensive spines often evolve in tandem with other traits, like stronger limbs to account for carrying the weight of the spines. It's also been observed that mammals with defensive armor may take more risks, such as going further out into open territory and becoming more vulnerable to predation. Additionally, a correlation between spine development and reduction in brain size has been observed, attributed to the energy devoted to forming the complex structures of their spines. This correlation has not been observed in porcupines. And as written above, defensive spines are correlated with insectivorous diets and lower BMRs.

== Treating injuries caused by spines ==
Because many species of fish and invertebrates carry venom within their spines, a rule of thumb is to treat every injury as if it were a snake bite. Venom can cause intense pain, and can sometimes result in death if left untreated.

On the other hand, being pricked by a porcupine quill is not dangerous, and the quills are not poisonous. The quill can be removed by gently but firmly pulling it out of the skin. The barbed tip sometimes breaks off, but it works its way out through the skin over time.

== Human uses ==
Spines and quills have been used by humans for multiple purposes due to their various physical and aesthetic properties. Some examples of uses for animal spines and quills include:

- Jewelry
  - Hairpins, used by some local people in West Java to ward away black magic
  - Necklaces and bracelets
  - Piercings, using spines or quills as jewelry for body modification (e.g. septum piercing)
- Quillwork, a form of textile embellishment traditionally practiced by Indigenous peoples of North America that employs the quills of porcupines as an aesthetic element
- Pens
  - Some of the earliest pens were made from quills, though most writing instruments referred to as "quills" are made from bird feathers
- Brushes
  - Occasionally, quills may be made into brushes

Animal spines and quills have also been the subject of scientific research in biomimetics for proposed novel uses.

- Syringe needles and plungers
- Ceramics
  - The porosity properties of the spines of Phyllacanthus imperialis, a species of sea urchin, have been used as biomimetic inspiration for the design of porous ceramics
