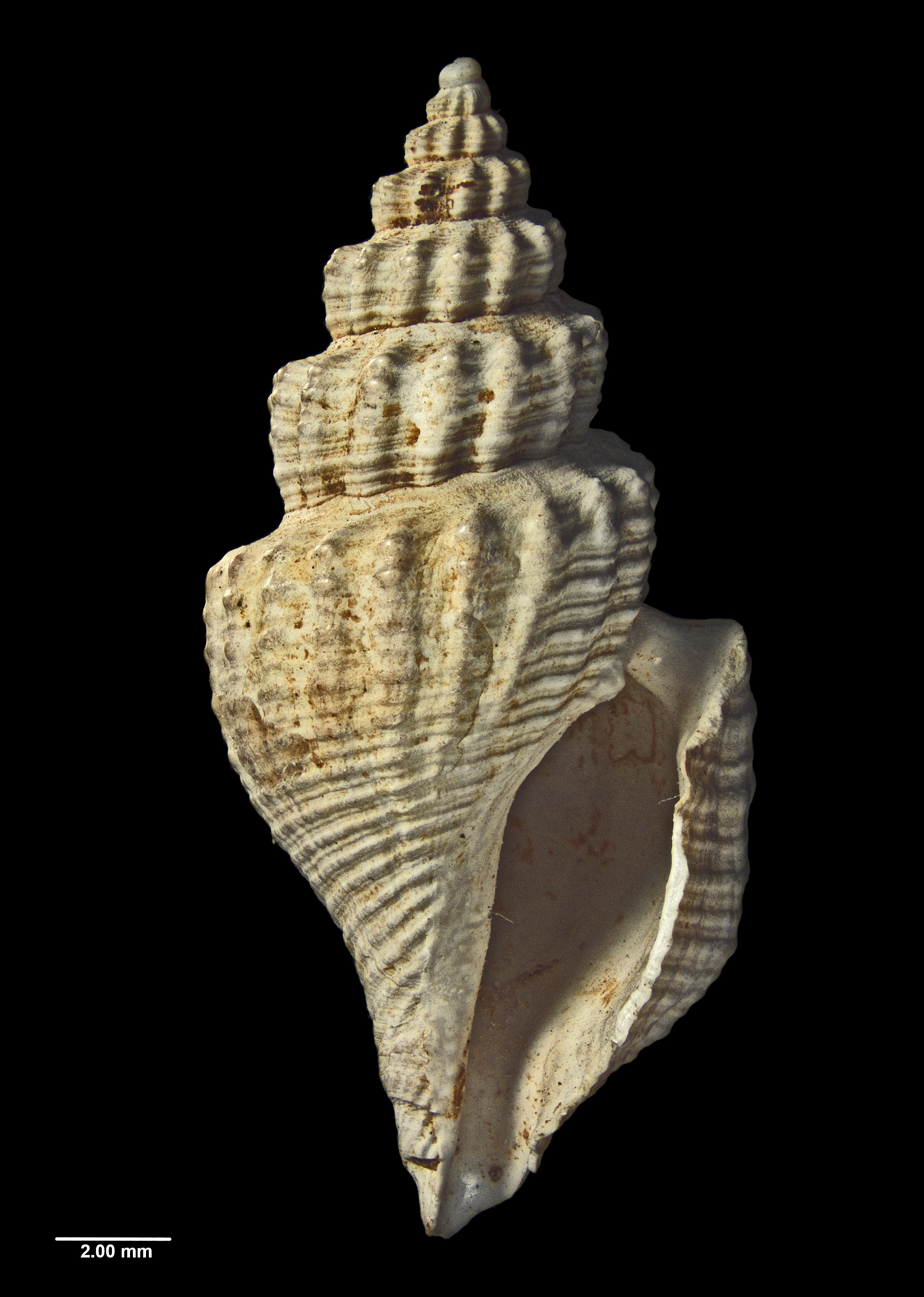
- Holotype from Auckland War Memorial Museum

Scientific classification
- Kingdom: Animalia
- Phylum: Mollusca
- Class: Gastropoda
- Subclass: Caenogastropoda
- Order: Neogastropoda
- Family: Clathurellidae
- Genus: Etrema
- Species: †E. gippslandensis

Binomial name
- †Etrema gippslandensis A. W. B. Powell, 1944

= Etrema gippslandensis =

Etrema gippslandensis Temporal range: late Miocene

Extinct species of gastropod

Etrema gippslandensis is an extinct species of sea snail, a marine gastropod mollusc, in the family Pseudomelatomidae. Fossils of the species date to late Miocene strata of the Gippsland Basin of Victoria, Australia.

== Description ==
In the original description, Powell described the species as follows:

Resembles bidens, but much larger; differing in the protoconch, having a less angulate second whorl, obsolete shoulder spirals, and absence of granules on the basal spirals. Whorls angled at two-thirds whorl height. Shoulder almost flat, gently descending. Primary spirals 4 on spire-whorls, 15 on body-whorl, with 1-3 weak secondary lirae in interspaces. Axials broadly rounded folds, 15 per whorl, fading out on shoulder and base. Sinus deep. Parietal tubercle strong, a few irregular minute tubercles on lower half of pillar. Inner lip thin at edge, strengthened behind by a heavy varix; very faint lirations within.

The holotype of the species measures 20.5 mm (0.81 in) in height and has a diameter of 9.75 mm (0.384 in). It can be distinguished from E. mirabilis due to E. gippslandensis having a slight angulation on the last whorl of the shell.

== Taxonomy ==
The species was first described by A. W. B. Powell in 1944. The holotype was collected at an unknown date prior to 1944 from the Gippsland Lakes area in Victoria, Australia, and is held by the Auckland War Memorial Museum.

== Distribution ==
This extinct marine species occurs in late Miocene strata of the Gippsland Basin of Victoria, Australia, including the Jemmys Point Formation, and the Bunga Creek bed.

== Gallery ==
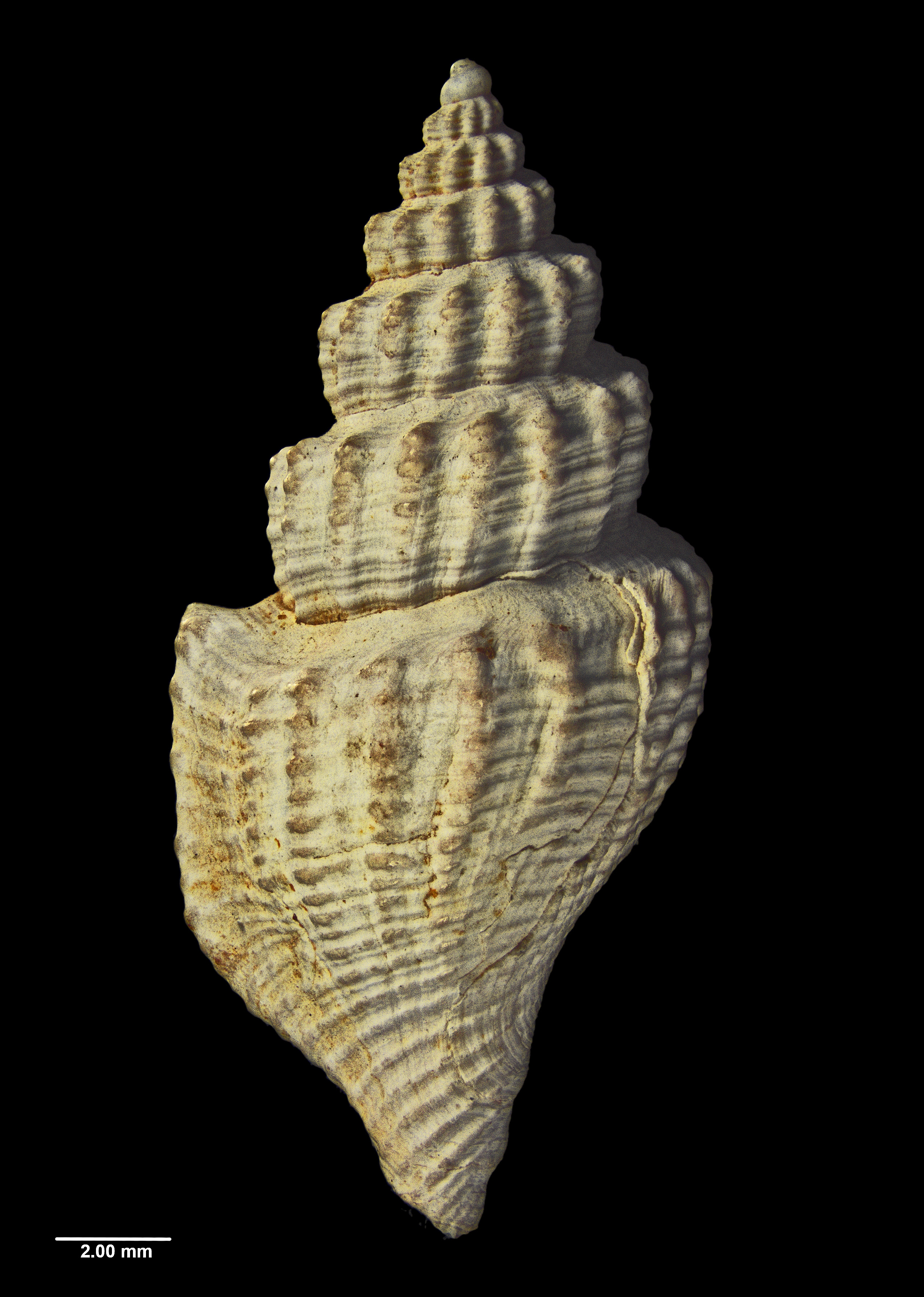
Reverse view of holotype

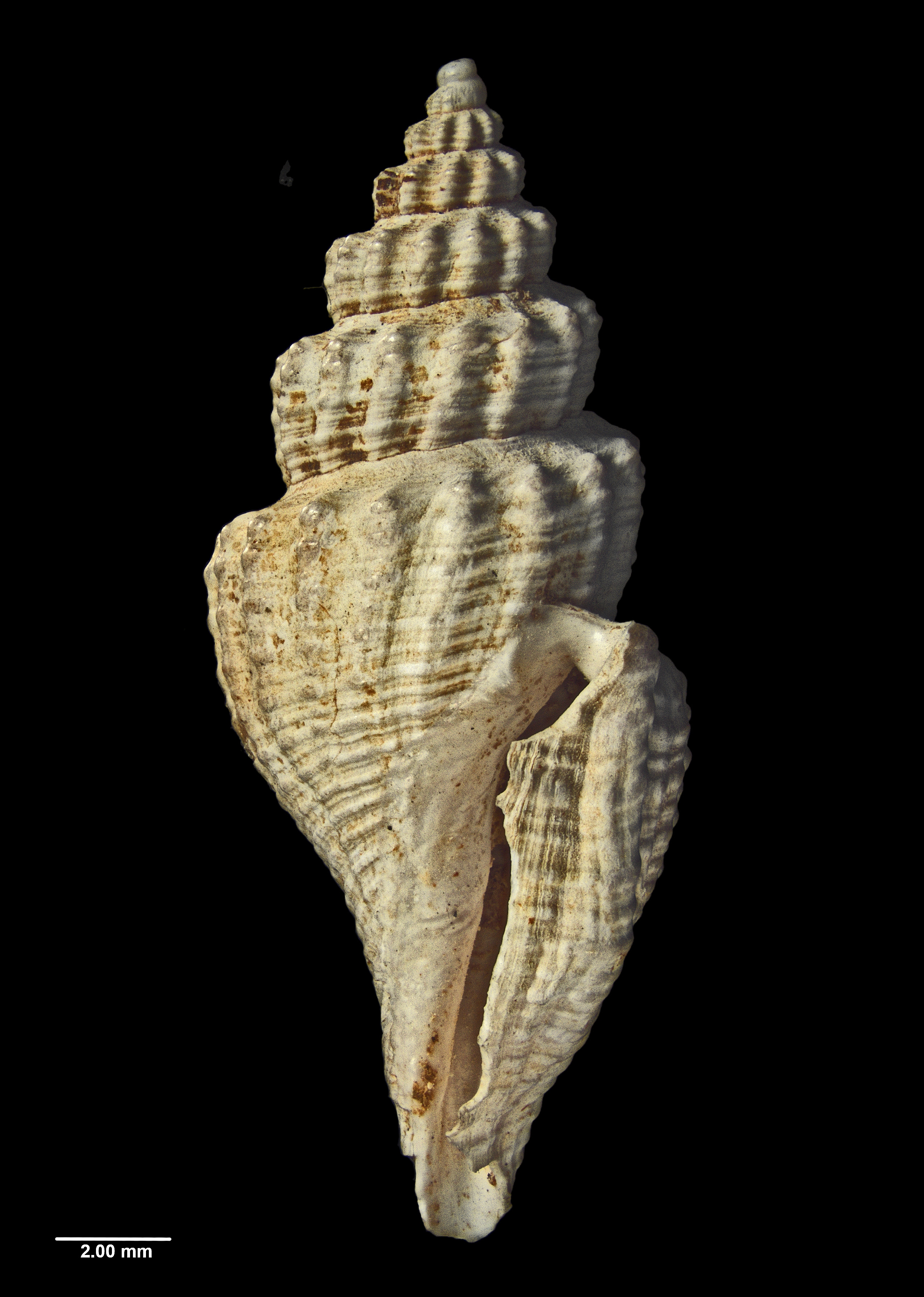
Side view of holotype
