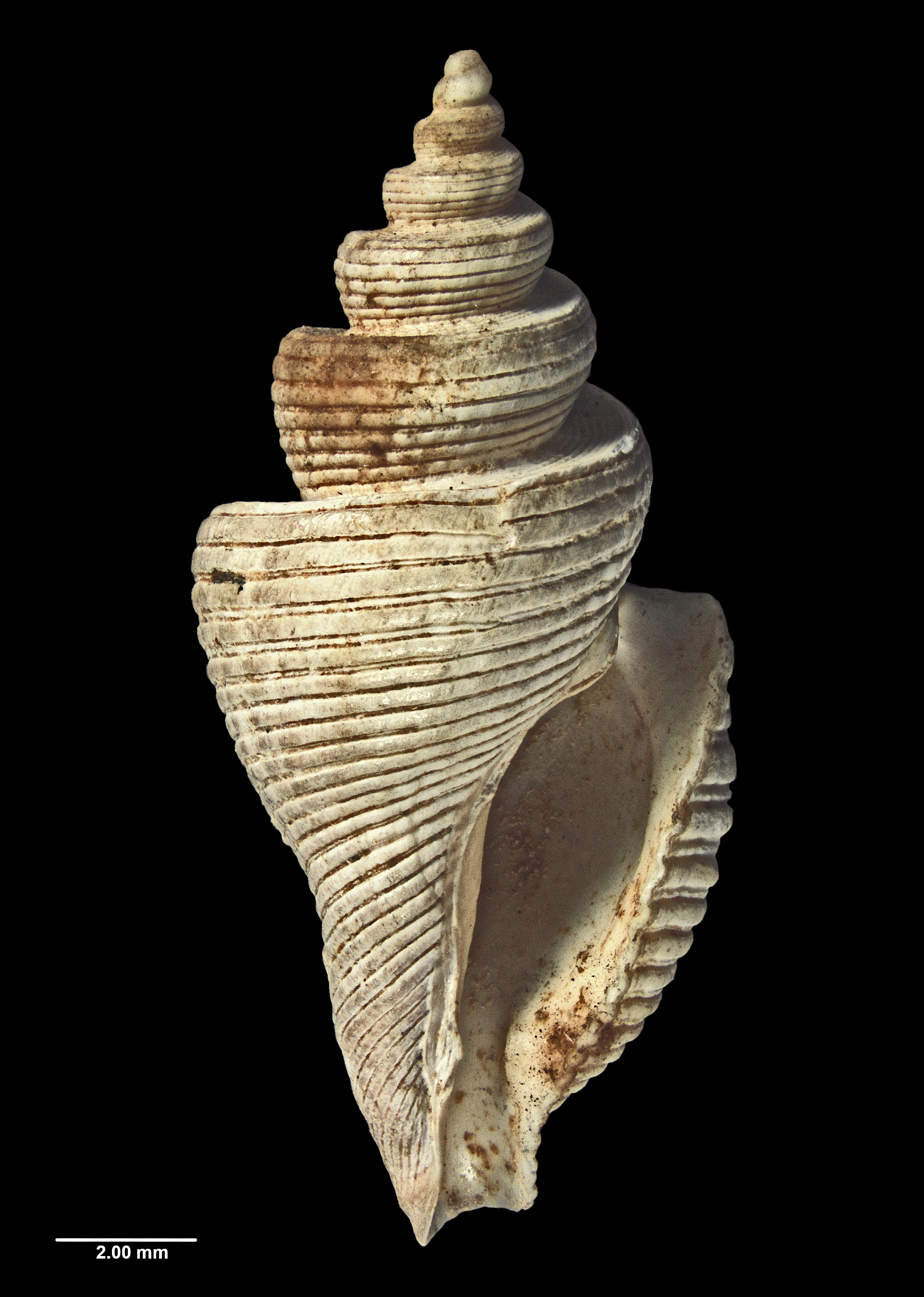
- Holotype from Auckland War Memorial Museum

Scientific classification
- Kingdom: Animalia
- Phylum: Mollusca
- Class: Gastropoda
- Subclass: Caenogastropoda
- Order: Neogastropoda
- Family: Clathurellidae
- Genus: Etrema
- Species: †E. mirabilis

Binomial name
- †Etrema mirabilis A. W. B. Powell, 1944

= Etrema mirabilis =

Etrema mirabilis Temporal range: late Miocene

Extinct species of gastropod

Etrema mirabilis is an extinct species of sea snail, a marine gastropod mollusc, in the family Pseudomelatomidae. Fossils of the species date to late Miocene strata of the Gippsland Basin of Victoria, Australia.

== Description ==
In the original description, Powell described the species as follows:

Large, differing from all other species of Etrema in the total absence of axials, concave, inwardly inclined shoulder and erect, papillate, smooth protoconch of 2 1/4 whorls without a keel. Spiral sculpture of broad, flattened cords separated by narrow, shallow interspaces, 8 on penultimate, 23 on body-whorl. A thread in each interspace over the median area of body-whorl. Sinus deep, subtubular. Parietal tubercle strong. Outer lip thin and crenulated at edge, strengthened behind by a heavy varix, and within by a narrow ridge.

The holotype of the species measures 17.5 mm (0.69 in) in length and has a diameter of 7.6 mm (0.30 in). It can be distinguished from E. gippslandensis due to the slight angulation on the last whorl of the shell.

== Taxonomy ==
The species was first described by A. W. B. Powell in 1944 as Pseudoinquisitor trinervis. The holotype was collected by farmer Christopher Ritchie, likely from the Mississippi Creek near Lakes Entrance in Victoria, Australia at an unknown date prior to 1937. A part of the Finlay Collection held by the Auckland War Memorial Museum, H. J. Finlay had stolen the specimen from the National Museum of Victoria's Dennant Collection, which had been on loan to F. A. Singleton.

== Distribution ==
This extinct marine species occurs in late Miocene strata of the Gippsland Basin of Victoria, Australia, including the Jemmys Point Formation.

== Gallery ==
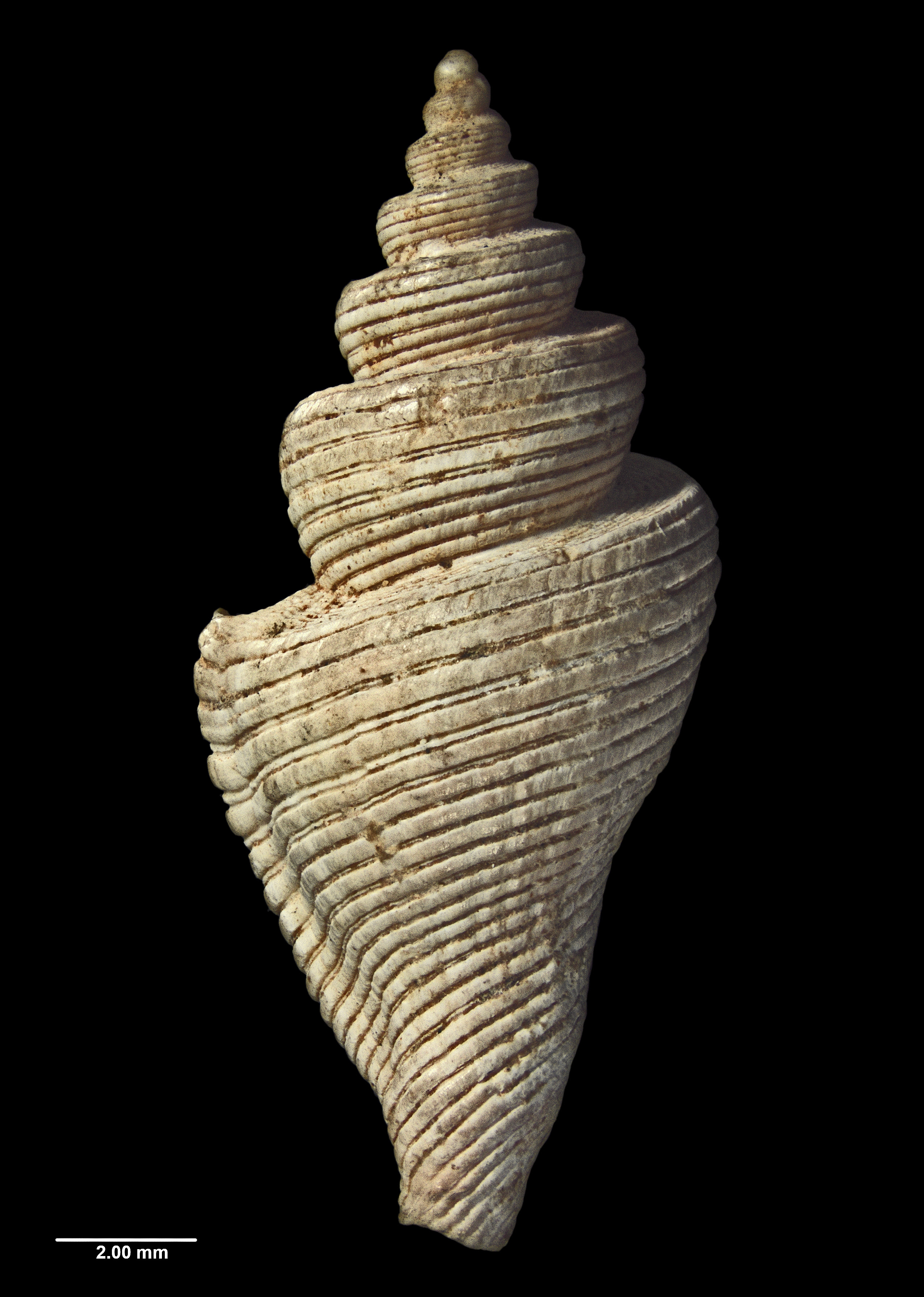
Reverse view of holotype

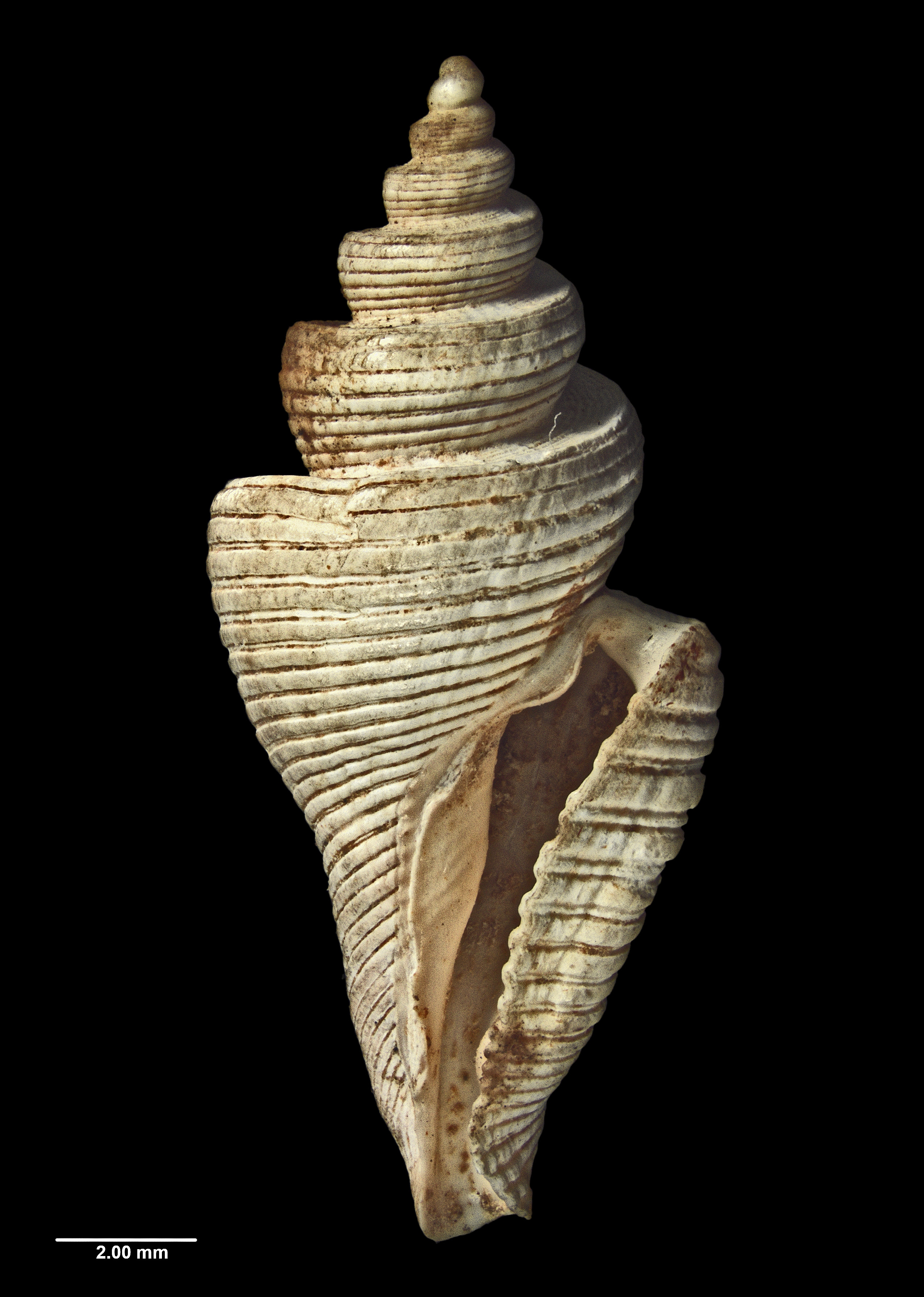
Side view of holotype
