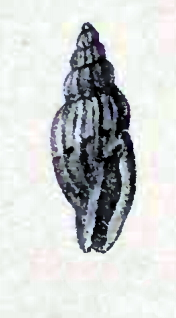
- Drawing of a shell of Eucithara unilineata

Scientific classification
- Domain: Eukaryota
- Kingdom: Animalia
- Phylum: Mollusca
- Class: Gastropoda
- Subclass: Caenogastropoda
- Order: Neogastropoda
- Superfamily: Conoidea
- Family: Mangeliidae
- Genus: Eucithara
- Species: E. unilineata

Binomial name
- Eucithara unilineata (E. A. Smith, 1876)

Synonyms
- Cithara raffini Hervier, 1898; Cythara unilineata E. A. Smith, 1876 (original combination); Mangilia (Cithara) unilineata Bouge & Dautzenberg, 1914; Pusionella raffini Hervier, R.P.J., 1897

= Eucithara unilineata =

Species of gastropod

Eucithara unilineata is a small sea snail, a marine gastropod mollusk in the family Mangeliidae.

== Description ==
The length of the shell attains 16 mm, its diameter 6 mm. The shell is longitudinally ribbed and transversely striate. Both lips are denticulate. Its color is yellowish white or light brown, with an interrupted white median band margined below with chestnut.

The fusiform shell, has an elongated oblong shape. It appears to be one of the largest species of its kind. Its coloring is yellowish-white in the upper part of the whorls, and is of a light fawn tone in the lower part. These two colors are separated by a small brown zone that circulates between the ribs. On the body whorl the tawny yellow hue appears at the suture and disappears at the siphonal canal, leaving only two white bands, one on the upper part of the whorl, the other at the end. The spire is decorated with longitudinal ribs and decurrent striae; The ribs (numbering 10 on the penultimate whorl and 11 on the body whorl), are fairly prominent, not very thick, leaving between them an interstice equal to twice their breadth. Originating at the suture, they descend flexuously towards the siphonal canal where their concentric arcs come together. The spiral striae are weak, not prominent, and sufficiently impressed. They traverse the ribs and their interstices; They decrease in number towards the siphonal canal as they become more stronger and higher. The only copy of this species has the apex fractured. There are only 5 whorls left. These whorls are convex, separated by an undulating linear suture. The body whorl, which exceeds half the total height, presents, on the side opposite to the outer lip, a convex profile, more rapidly acuminated below the middle. The aperture is obliquely elongated, narrowly semi-oval. The peristome is continuous, white in the interior. The columella, weakly concave in its upper part, is furrowed in its entire length by numerous folds, very distinct but rather thin, which run along the edge in its width and In the interior. The outer lip, seen from the front, offers a fairly regular semi-oval profile. Seen in the plane of the aperture, it is flexibly arched. Thickened on the last rib, it presents a sharp lip below which comes a large number of small well-marked folds, which appear as denticles. The sinus, located below the suture, is small, obliquely and deeply lodged back in the callus which is prominent on the outer lip.

== Distribution ==
This marine species occurs off the Solomon Islands and New Caledonia
