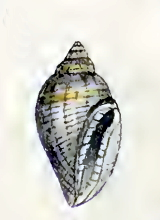
- Drawing of a shell of Eucithara subglobosa

Scientific classification
- Kingdom: Animalia
- Phylum: Mollusca
- Class: Gastropoda
- Subclass: Caenogastropoda
- Order: Neogastropoda
- Superfamily: Conoidea
- Family: Mangeliidae
- Genus: Eucithara
- Species: E. subglobosa

Binomial name
- Eucithara subglobosa (Hervier, 1897)

Synonyms
- Cithara subglobosa Hervier, 1897

= Eucithara subglobosa =

Species of gastropod

Eucithara subglobosa is a small sea snail, a marine gastropod mollusk in the family Mangeliidae.

== Description ==
The length of the shell attains 6 mm, its diameter 3.5 mm.

The small shell is remarkable for its oval subglobulous shape, with a convex very short spire, briefly acuminate The coloring is of a bright hyaline white, embellished with a very narrow yellow band, situated a little above the lower suture. The spire has a crystalline aspect. It is rather strongly thickened, very finely striated throughout its length, adorned with longitudinal ribs. These are flexuous, low, numerous, and form, at their enlarged base. continuous concentric arcs. Small, decurrent, regular, numerous lirae, traverse the whorls and surmount the ribs and undulate in their interstices over the entire surface. The shell contains 6 to 7 (?) whorls (the fractured top in the received specimen shows only 5½ whorls). The first two whorls are rounded. The rest are convex, separated by a linear, undulating, somewhat thickened suture. The body whorl which exceeds 2/3 of the total height, is globular in its upper part, attenuating slightly below its middle to end with an elongation in a very short siphonal canal. The aperture is oblique, narrow and has a continuous peristome. The columella, concave in its upper part, is coated with an enamel whose edge rises in a blunt crest. Starting at this ridge, pointing inwards, are 8 folds regularly spaced along the length. The outer lip is convex, strongly thickened; Its sharp edge is not prominent. The folds in the interior protrude in the form of strong denticles. The almost round sinus is dug a little below the suture in the callosity of the outer lip.

== Distribution ==
This marine species occurs off the Loyalty Islands and Taiwan.
