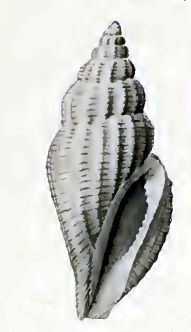
- Original image of a shell of Eucithara guentheri

Scientific classification
- Kingdom: Animalia
- Phylum: Mollusca
- Class: Gastropoda
- Subclass: Caenogastropoda
- Order: Neogastropoda
- Superfamily: Conoidea
- Family: Mangeliidae
- Genus: Eucithara
- Species: E. guentheri

Binomial name
- Eucithara guentheri (G. B. Sowerby III, 1893)

Synonyms
- Cythara guentheri G. B. Sowerby III, 1893 (original combination); Mangelia ponderosa Brazier, 1876 (not Reeve)

= Eucithara guentheri =

Species of gastropod

Eucithara guentheri is a small sea snail, a marine gastropod mollusk in the family Mangeliidae.

== Description ==
The length of the shell attains 25.4 mm, its diameter 10.5 mm. This is the largest species in this genus.

This solid shell with an elongated conical shape has an acuminate apex. Its ground color is white, tinted with red spots and a purple spot on the back. The shell contains 10 angular whorls. It is delicately sculptured with longitudinally ribs, latticed by revolving striae. The aperture is narrow and oblong. The columella is slightly curved and contains a white callus. The outer lip is thickened and has a sharp edge.

== Distribution ==
This marine species is endemic to Australia and occurs off the Northern Territory, Queensland and Western Australia.
