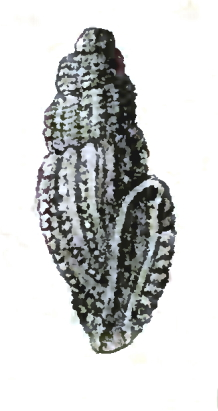
- Image of a shell of Eucithara gradata

Scientific classification
- Kingdom: Animalia
- Phylum: Mollusca
- Class: Gastropoda
- Subclass: Caenogastropoda
- Order: Neogastropoda
- Superfamily: Conoidea
- Family: Mangeliidae
- Genus: Eucithara
- Species: E. gradata

Binomial name
- Eucithara gradata (G. Nevill & H. Nevill, 1875)

Synonyms
- Cythara gradata Nevill & Nevill, 1875 (original combination)

= Eucithara gradata =

Species of gastropod

Eucithara gradata is a small sea snail, a marine gastropod mollusk in the family Mangeliidae.

== Distribution ==
This marine species is found off Western India, and Sri Lanka.

== Description ==
The length of the shell attains 5.75 mm, its diameter 2.5 mm.

The ribs are narrow, straight, and continue to the base of the body whorl. The interstices are regularly transversely striated. The columella is almost straight, slightly rugose above,. The outer lip is nearly straight, very thick, regularly rounded. The color of the shell is pure white.
