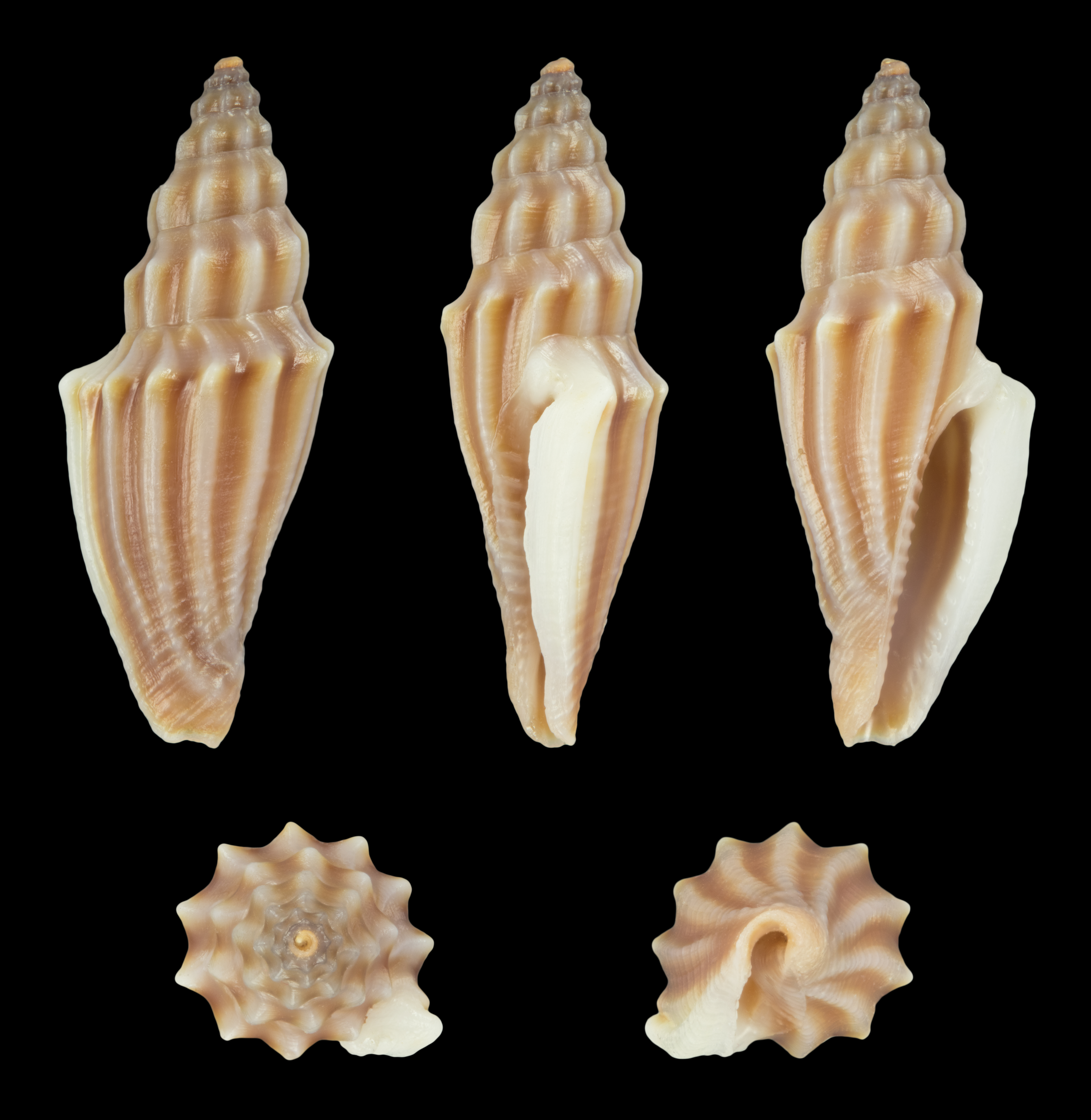
- Shell of Eucithara funiculata

Scientific classification
- Kingdom: Animalia
- Phylum: Mollusca
- Class: Gastropoda
- Subclass: Caenogastropoda
- Order: Neogastropoda
- Superfamily: Conoidea
- Family: Mangeliidae
- Genus: Eucithara
- Species: E. funiculata

Binomial name
- Eucithara funiculata (Reeve, 1846)

Synonyms
- Mangelia funiculata Reeve, 1846 (original combination)

= Eucithara funiculata =

Species of gastropod

Eucithara funiculata, common name the corded turrid, is a small sea snail, a marine gastropod mollusk in the family Mangeliidae.

== Description ==
The length of the shell varies between 20 mm and 25 mm.

The shell has a smooth appearance. The outer lip is toothed. The color of the shell is ashy brown, the ribs whitish.

== Distribution ==
This marine species occurs in the Indo-Pacific, off the Philippines, Guam and Australia.
