= Eucithara paucicostata =

Scientific classification
- Kingdom: Animalia
- Phylum: Mollusca
- Class: Gastropoda
- Subclass: Caenogastropoda
- Order: Neogastropoda
- Superfamily: Conoidea
- Family: Mangeliidae
- Genus: Eucithara
- Species: E. paucicostata

Binomial name
- Eucithara paucicostata (Pease, 1868)

Synonyms
- Cithara paucicostata Pease, 1868 (original combination); Cythara angiostoma Pease, 1868; Mangilia (Cythara) paucicostata (Pease, 1868)

Species of gastropod

Eucithara paucicostata is a small sea snail, a marine gastropod mollusk in the family Mangeliidae.

This is not Mangelia paucicostata Risso, A., 1826.

== Distribution ==
This marine species occurs in Polynesia and off Tahiti
