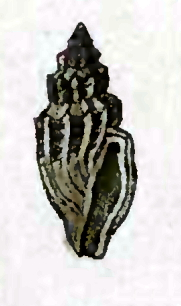
- Drawing of a shell of Eucithara cincta

Scientific classification
- Kingdom: Animalia
- Phylum: Mollusca
- Class: Gastropoda
- Subclass: Caenogastropoda
- Order: Neogastropoda
- Superfamily: Conoidea
- Family: Mangeliidae
- Genus: Eucithara
- Species: E. cincta

Binomial name
- Eucithara cincta (Reeve, 1846)

Synonyms
- Mangelia cincta Reeve, 1846 (original combination)

= Eucithara cincta =

Species of gastropod

Eucithara cincta is a small sea snail, a marine gastropod mollusk in the family Mangeliidae.

== Description ==
The length of the shell attains 7.5 mm.

The whorls are rather narrowly shouldered, the shoulder-angle sharp pointed by the ribs, which attain the suture. The interstices of the ribs show revolving striae. The color of the shell is yellowish brown, with a broad superior darker band.

== Distribution ==
This marine species occurs off the Philippines.
