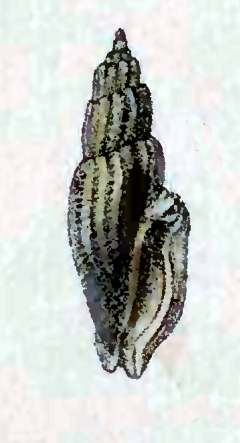
- Drawing of a shell of Eucithara castanea

Scientific classification
- Kingdom: Animalia
- Phylum: Mollusca
- Class: Gastropoda
- Subclass: Caenogastropoda
- Order: Neogastropoda
- Superfamily: Conoidea
- Family: Mangeliidae
- Genus: Eucithara
- Species: E. castanea

Binomial name
- Eucithara castanea (Reeve, 1846)

Synonyms
- Mangelia castanea Reeve, 1846 (original combination); Mangelia casta Reeve, L.A., 1846 (renamed)

= Eucithara castanea =

Species of gastropod

Eucithara castanea is a small sea snail, a marine gastropod mollusk in the family Mangeliidae.

== Description ==
The length of the shell attains 11 mm.

The whorls are rounded and longitudinally ribbed. The interstices show close revolving striae; chestnut-brown.

== Distribution ==
This marine species occurs off the Philippines and off Queensland (Australia).
