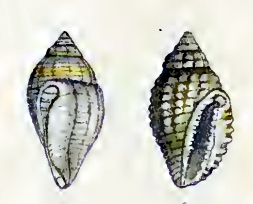
- Original image of a shell of Eucithara diaglypha

Scientific classification
- Domain: Eukaryota
- Kingdom: Animalia
- Phylum: Mollusca
- Class: Gastropoda
- Subclass: Caenogastropoda
- Order: Neogastropoda
- Superfamily: Conoidea
- Family: Mangeliidae
- Genus: Eucithara
- Species: E. diaglypha

Binomial name
- Eucithara diaglypha (Hervier, 1897)

Synonyms
- Cithara diaglypha Hervier, 1897 (original combination)

= Eucithara diaglypha =

Species of gastropod

Eucithara diaglypha is a small sea snail, a marine gastropod mollusk in the family Mangeliidae.

== Description ==
The length of the shell attains 6 mm, its diameter 3 mm.

The small shell has an oval shape with a very short turriculated spire. The crystalline shell is thickened. It shows flexuous longitudinal ribs. These are numerous, low, with a rounded ridge, joining to their extended base. They are transversally surmounted by high, numerous, rounded, fairly strong cords. These are polished and shiny, which give them a tuberculous appearance. Between these the surface of the costulae and their intervals is remarkably covered with very fine transverse striations, flowing like wavy lines and latticed by the growth lines. The coloring is a very bright yellow in the interstices of the high ribs, presenting a tuberculate projection of a bright hyaline white. The yellow color tends to disappear on the upper whorls and at the base of the latter. The shell consists of 6 to 7 (?) whorls. The fractured apex did not allow the study of the embryonic whorls. The upper convex whorls are distinctly cone shaped and are very short by a subcanaliculate suture. The body whorl, exceeding 2/3 of the height of the shell, is swollen in its upper part, and its convexity, barely depressed below the middle, advances regularly attenuated to the base. The oblique aperture is narrowly elongated. The continuous peristome forms over all the length of its insertion on the columellar lip one rounded, rather prominent small ridge. The convex outer lip is thickened, with a crenate, sharp margin and shows a series of 7 denticles. The slightly round sinus is lodged a little below the suture, notched in the thickening of the outer lip.

== Distribution ==
This marine species occurs off New Caledonia and the Loyalty Islands
