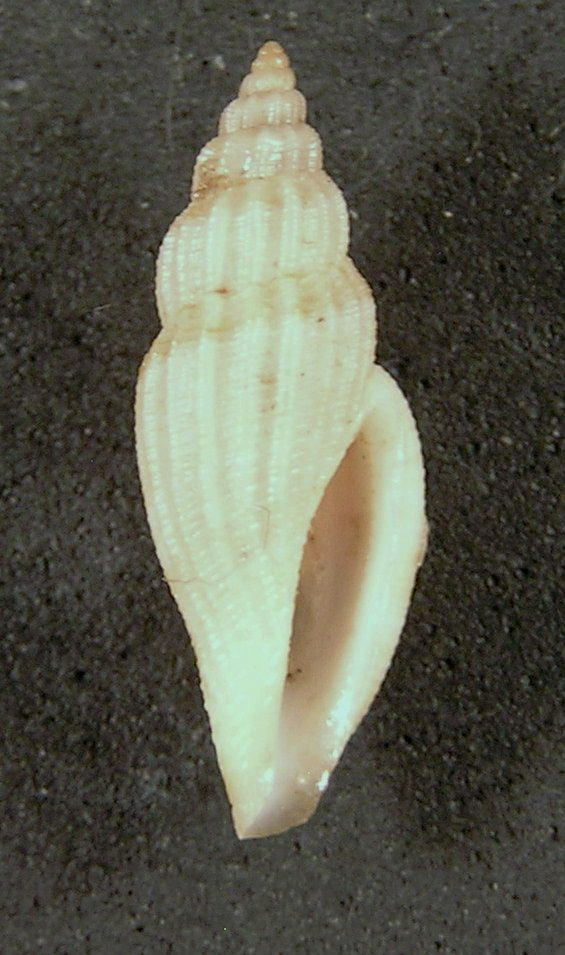
- Apertural view of a shell of Eucithara albivestis

Scientific classification
- Kingdom: Animalia
- Phylum: Mollusca
- Class: Gastropoda
- Subclass: Caenogastropoda
- Order: Neogastropoda
- Superfamily: Conoidea
- Family: Mangeliidae
- Genus: Eucithara
- Species: E. albivestis

Binomial name
- Eucithara albivestis (Pilsbry, 1934)

Synonyms
- Eucithara pura H.A. Pilsbry, 1904; Mangelia albivestis Pilsbry, 1934 (original combination); Mangilia pura Pilsbry, 1904 (non Gould, 1860)

= Eucithara albivestis =

Species of gastropod

Eucithara albivestis is a small sea snail, a marine gastropod mollusk in the family Mangeliidae.

== Description ==
The shell length varies between 5 mm and 8 mm.

== Distribution ==
This marine species occurs off Japan, the Philippines and Fiji.
