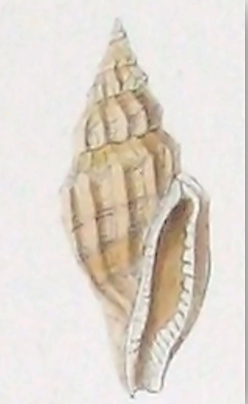
- Shell of Eucithara elegans

Scientific classification
- Kingdom: Animalia
- Phylum: Mollusca
- Class: Gastropoda
- Subclass: Caenogastropoda
- Order: Neogastropoda
- Superfamily: Conoidea
- Family: Mangeliidae
- Genus: Eucithara
- Species: E. elegans

Binomial name
- Eucithara elegans (Reeve, 1846)

Synonyms
- Mangelia elegans Reeve, 1846 (original combination)

= Eucithara elegans =

Species of gastropod

Eucithara elegans is a small sea snail, a marine gastropod mollusc in the family Mangeliidae.

== Description ==
The length of the shell attains 9.6 mm, its diameter 4.1 mm.

The interstices of the narrow ribs are very beautifully elevately striated. The inner lip shows 9 - 11 teeth, the outer lip 13- 14. The shell is yellowish white, very faintly zoned with brown.

== Distribution ==
This marine species occurs off the Philippines.
