= Eucithara ella =

Scientific classification
- Kingdom: Animalia
- Phylum: Mollusca
- Class: Gastropoda
- Subclass: Caenogastropoda
- Order: Neogastropoda
- Superfamily: Conoidea
- Family: Mangeliidae
- Genus: Eucithara
- Species: E. ella

Binomial name
- Eucithara ella (Thiele, 1925)

Synonyms
- Mangelia ella Thiele, 1925 (original combination)

Species of gastropod

Eucithara ella is a small sea snail, a marine gastropod mollusk in the family Mangeliidae.

== Distribution ==
This marine species occurs off East Africa.
