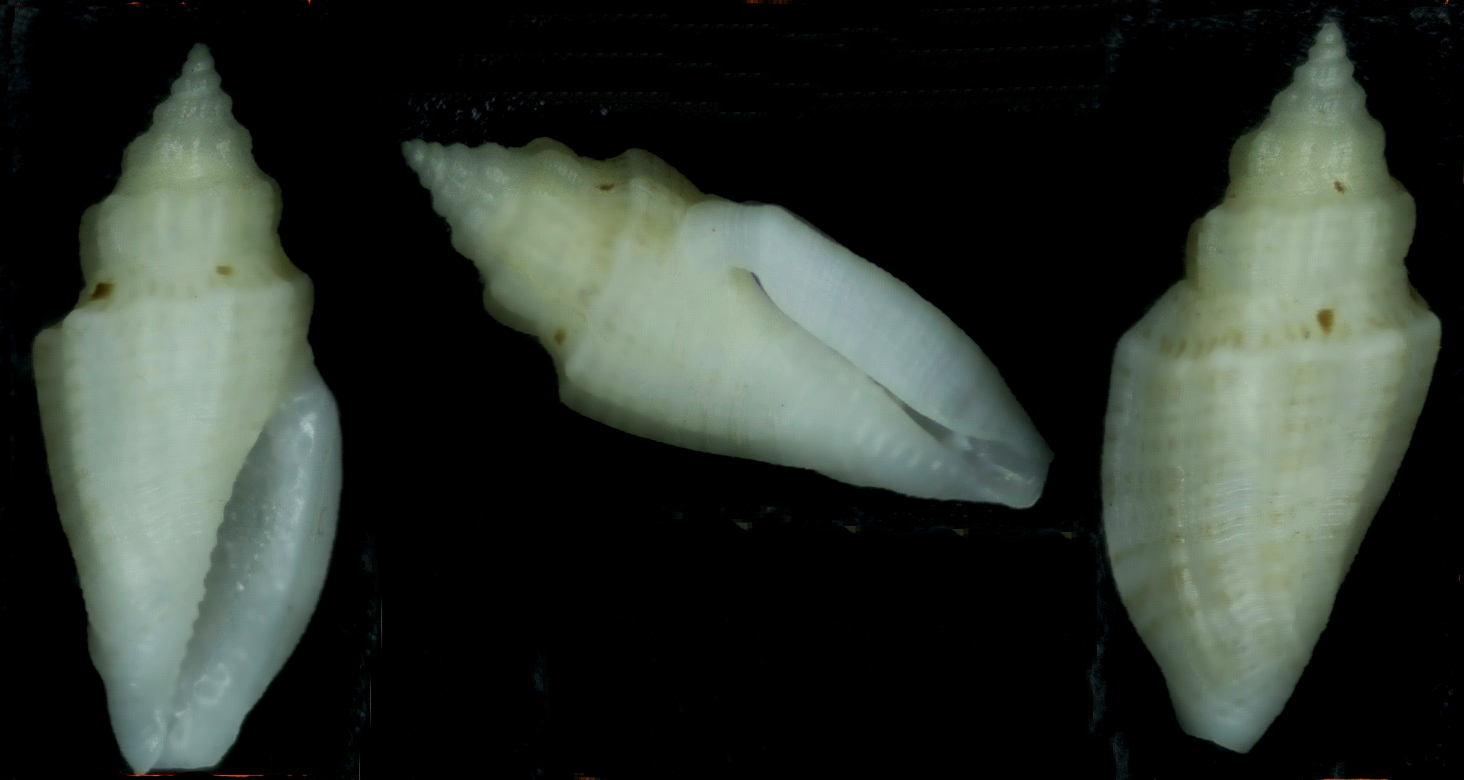
- Shells of Eucithara pulchella

Scientific classification
- Kingdom: Animalia
- Phylum: Mollusca
- Class: Gastropoda
- Subclass: Caenogastropoda
- Order: Neogastropoda
- Superfamily: Conoidea
- Family: Mangeliidae
- Genus: Eucithara
- Species: E. pulchella

Binomial name
- Eucithara pulchella (Reeve, 1846)

Synonyms
- Cithara pulchella (Reeve, 1846).; Mangelia pulchella Reeve, 1846 (original combination)

= Eucithara pulchella =

Species of gastropod

Eucithara pulchella is a small sea snail, a marine gastropod mollusk in the family Mangeliidae.

== Description ==
The length of the shell attains 12 mm.

The shell is many ribbed, the ribs flexuous, narrow, the interstices very faintly reticulated. Its color is yellowish white, with several narrow chestnut bands interrupted by the ribs.

== Distribution ==
This marine species occurs off the Philippines, Queensland (Australia) and Tonga.
