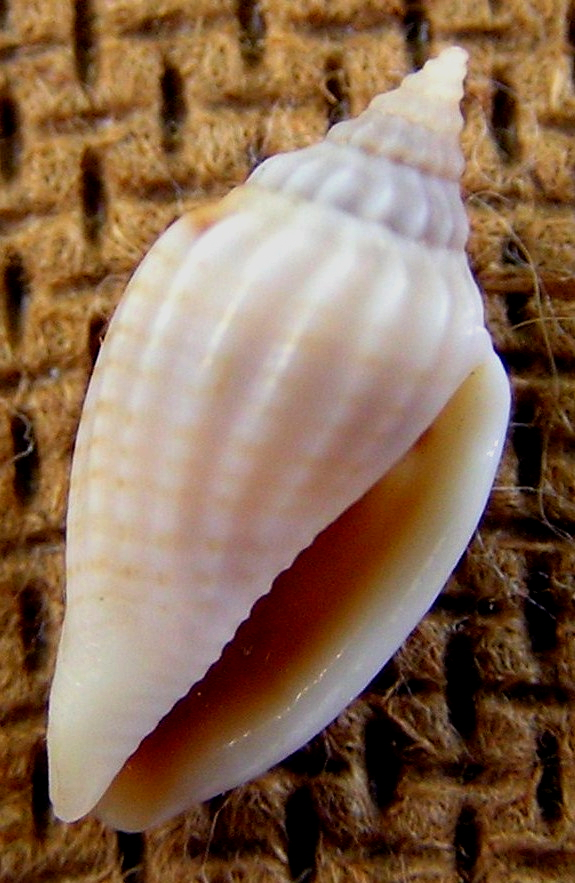
- Apertural view of a shell of Eucithara marginelloides

Scientific classification
- Kingdom: Animalia
- Phylum: Mollusca
- Class: Gastropoda
- Subclass: Caenogastropoda
- Order: Neogastropoda
- Superfamily: Conoidea
- Family: Mangeliidae
- Genus: Eucithara
- Species: E. marginelloides

Binomial name
- Eucithara marginelloides (Reeve, 1846)

Synonyms
- Mangelia marginelloides Reeve, 1846 (original combination)

= Eucithara marginelloides =

Species of gastropod

Eucithara marginelloides is a small sea snail, a marine gastropod mollusk in the family Mangeliidae.

== Description ==
The length of the shell attains 15 mm.

The interstices of the longitudinal ribs are either smooth or more or less thickly covered with fine revolving striae. The color of the shell is yellowish or ashwhite, with fine, rather close chestnut revolving lines, sometimes interrupted by the ribs, sometimes crossing them, sometimes obsolete. The shoulder is usually tinged with chocolate.

== Distribution ==
This marine species occurs off the Philippines, New Guinea and New Caledonia.
