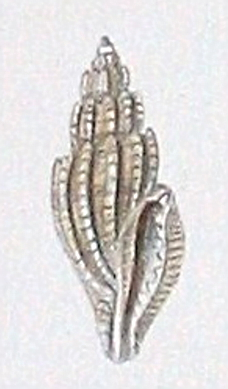
- Original image of a shell of Eucithara lamellata

Scientific classification
- Kingdom: Animalia
- Phylum: Mollusca
- Class: Gastropoda
- Subclass: Caenogastropoda
- Order: Neogastropoda
- Superfamily: Conoidea
- Family: Mangeliidae
- Genus: Eucithara
- Species: E. lamellata

Binomial name
- Eucithara lamellata (Reeve, 1846)

Synonyms
- Mangelia lamellata Reeve, 1846 (original combination)

= Eucithara lamellata =

Species of gastropod

Eucithara lamellata is a small sea snail, a marine gastropod mollusk in the family Mangeliidae.

== Description ==
The length of the shell attains 13 mm.

The sutures are deep, a little cavernous. The ribs are narrow, erect, lamelliform, somewhat pointed around the sutures, transversely strongly distantly striate. The color of the shell is yellowish white, faintly zoned with pale brown.

== Distribution ==
This marine species occurs off the Philippines; in the Indian Ocean off Réunion and Mauritius.
