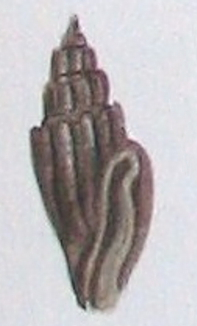
- Original image of a shell of Eucithara tenebrosa

Scientific classification
- Kingdom: Animalia
- Phylum: Mollusca
- Class: Gastropoda
- Subclass: Caenogastropoda
- Order: Neogastropoda
- Superfamily: Conoidea
- Family: Mangeliidae
- Genus: Eucithara
- Species: E. tenebrosa

Binomial name
- Eucithara tenebrosa (Reeve, 1846)

Synonyms
- Mangelia tenebrosa Reeve, 1846 (original combination)

= Eucithara tenebrosa =

Species of gastropod

Eucithara tenebrosa is a small sea snail, a marine gastropod mollusk in the family Mangeliidae.

Kilburn (1992) listed this species as a provisionally valid.

== Description ==
The length of the shell attains 10 mm.

The shell is turreted, with narrowly, flatly shouldered whorls and deep sutures. It is distantly longitudinally ribbed, crossed by revolving striae. Its color is dark chestnut-brown without and within.

== Distribution ==
This marine species occurs off the Philippines.
