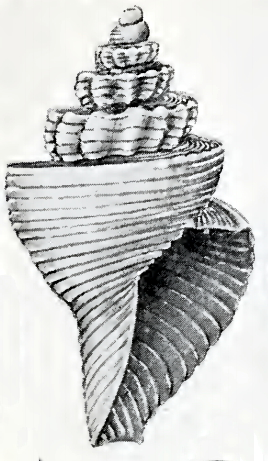
- Original image of a shell of Eucithara pagoda

Scientific classification
- Kingdom: Animalia
- Phylum: Mollusca
- Class: Gastropoda
- Subclass: Caenogastropoda
- Order: Neogastropoda
- Superfamily: Conoidea
- Family: Mangeliidae
- Genus: Eucithara
- Species: E. pagoda

Binomial name
- Eucithara pagoda (May, 1910)

Synonyms
- Daphnella pagoda W.L. May, 1911 (original combination)

= Eucithara pagoda =

Species of gastropod

Eucithara pagoda is a small sea snail, a marine gastropod mollusk in the family Mangeliidae.

== Distribution ==
This marine species is endemic to Australia and occurs off Tasmania.
