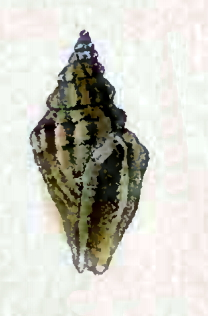
- Drawing of a shell of Eucithara trivittata

Scientific classification
- Kingdom: Animalia
- Phylum: Mollusca
- Class: Gastropoda
- Subclass: Caenogastropoda
- Order: Neogastropoda
- Superfamily: Conoidea
- Family: Mangeliidae
- Genus: Eucithara
- Species: E. trivittata

Binomial name
- Eucithara trivittata (Adams & Reeve, 1850)

Synonyms
- Mangelia trivittata Adams & Reeve, 1850

= Eucithara trivittata =

Species of gastropod

Eucithara trivittata is a small sea snail, a marine gastropod mollusk in the family Mangeliidae.

== Description ==
The length of the shell attains 6.5 mm.

The shell has an ovate shape, attenuated at both ends. It is smooth, transparent, shining and its sculpture consists of longitudinally cloes ribs. Its color is whitish, brown at the base, sometimes with three narrow, interrupted bands. It is also characterized by small, wavy spiral striae that are little protruding.

== Distribution ==
This marine species occurs off the Philippines.
