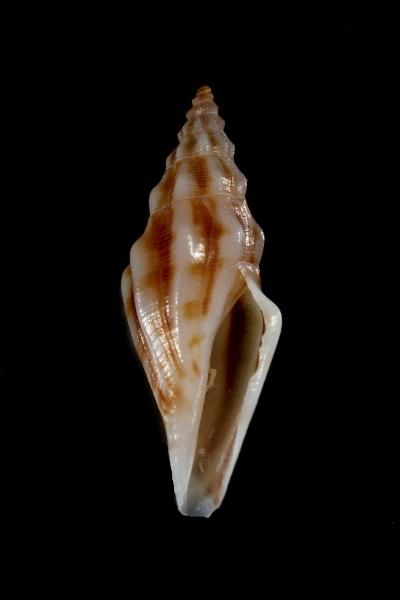
- Shell of Eucithara alacris (specimen in MNHN, Paris)

Scientific classification
- Kingdom: Animalia
- Phylum: Mollusca
- Class: Gastropoda
- Subclass: Caenogastropoda
- Order: Neogastropoda
- Superfamily: Conoidea
- Family: Mangeliidae
- Genus: Eucithara
- Species: E. alacris

Binomial name
- Eucithara alacris Hedley, 1922

Synonyms
- Cythara maculata Brazier, 1876

= Eucithara alacris =

Species of gastropod

Eucithara alacris is a small sea snail, a marine gastropod mollusk in the family Mangeliidae.

== Description ==
The shell length attains 11 mm; its diameter 4 mm.

The slender, glossy shell is fusiform. It contains 7 whorls, of which 1½ compose a small, smooth, helicoid protoconch. Its colour is white, ornamented with four to six pale orange bands, appearing only in the interstices, not on the ribs. These sometimes coalesce from above and below, thus replacing spiral by radial painting. The radial ribs are well developed, projecting as an angle on the shoulder, continuing from suture to base, and amounting to ten on the body whorl. The spiral threads are sharp on the upper whorls, where they are decussated by radial striae. Gradually they vanish, till on the middle of the body whorl the surface seems smooth to the eye, and only a few engraved spirals can be found with a lens. The mouth of the aperture is linear. The slight varix encloses a small sinus, and extends in a narrow free edge. The inner lip is well developed, with fifteen cross-bars. Beneath the varix are fourteen short entering plicae.

== Distribution ==
This marine species occurs off Australia (Queensland ), and off Vanuatu.
