= Eucithara capillaris =

Scientific classification
- Kingdom: Animalia
- Phylum: Mollusca
- Class: Gastropoda
- Subclass: Caenogastropoda
- Order: Neogastropoda
- Superfamily: Conoidea
- Family: Mangeliidae
- Genus: Eucithara
- Species: E. capillaris

Binomial name
- Eucithara capillaris Kilburn & Dekker, 2008

Species of gastropod

Eucithara capillaris is a small sea snail, a marine gastropod mollusc in the family Mangeliidae.

== Description ==
The length of the shell attains 6 mm.

== Distribution ==
This marine species occurs in the Red Sea.
