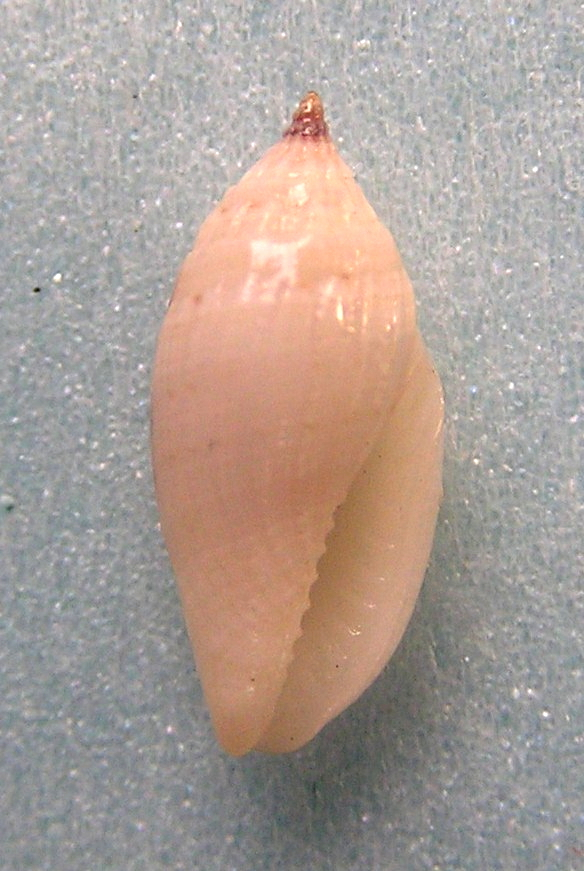
- Shell of Eucithara conohelicoides

Scientific classification
- Kingdom: Animalia
- Phylum: Mollusca
- Class: Gastropoda
- Subclass: Caenogastropoda
- Order: Neogastropoda
- Superfamily: Conoidea
- Family: Mangeliidae
- Genus: Eucithara
- Species: E. conohelicoides

Binomial name
- Eucithara conohelicoides (Reeve, 1846)

Synonyms
- Cithara onager (Souverbie, S.M., 1875); Eucithara onager (S.M. Souverbie, 1875); Mangelia conohelicoides Reeve, 1846 (original combination); Pleurotoma (Cithara) onager Souverbie, 1875

= Eucithara conohelicoides =

Species of gastropod

Eucithara conohelicoides is a small sea snail, a marine gastropod mollusk in the family Mangeliidae.

== Description ==
The length of the shell attains 13 mm.

The shell is longitudinally many ridged, transversely striate. Its color is yellowish white, with sometimes a large orange-brown blotch on the back of the body-whorl.

== Distribution ==
This marine species occurs off the Philippines and off Queensland, Australia.
