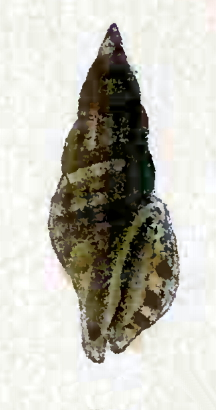
- Image of a shell of Eucithara planilabrum

Scientific classification
- Kingdom: Animalia
- Phylum: Mollusca
- Class: Gastropoda
- Subclass: Caenogastropoda
- Order: Neogastropoda
- Superfamily: Conoidea
- Family: Mangeliidae
- Genus: Eucithara
- Species: E. planilabrum

Binomial name
- Eucithara planilabrum (Reeve, 1843)

Synonyms
- Daphnella (Cithara) planilabrum (Reeve, 1843); Pleurotoma planilabrum Reeve, 1843 (original combination)

= Eucithara planilabrum =

Species of gastropod

Eucithara planilabrum is a small sea snail, a marine gastropod mollusk in the family Mangeliidae.

== Description ==
The length of the shell varies between 14 mm and 17 mm.

The shell isovately oblong. Its color is reddish brown. The whorls are onvex, lineated spirally, ribbed longitudinally, ribs almost obsolete. The aperture is oblong. The red outer lip is flat and denticulated within. The siphonal canal is very short.

== Distribution ==
This marine species occurs off the Philippines and Timor.
