= Eucithara vitiensis =

Scientific classification
- Domain: Eukaryota
- Kingdom: Animalia
- Phylum: Mollusca
- Class: Gastropoda
- Subclass: Caenogastropoda
- Order: Neogastropoda
- Superfamily: Conoidea
- Family: Mangeliidae
- Genus: Eucithara
- Species: E. vitiensis

Binomial name
- Eucithara vitiensis (E. A. Smith, 1884)

Synonyms
- Cithara vitiensis E. A. Smith, 1884 (original combination)

Species of gastropod

Eucithara vitiensis is a small sea snail, a marine gastropod mollusk in the family Mangeliidae.

== Description ==
The length of the shell attains 11.2 mm, its diameter 4.3 mm.

The shell has an ovate fusiform shape with a narrow base. Its color is dirty white There is a faint indication of spiral banding . The shell contains 8 whorls, of which two smooth conical whorls in the protoconch. The rest are convex with a shallow suture. The 12 opisthocline, almost straight axial ribs (11 on the penultimate whorl) are rounded and are wider than the intervals, not becoming weak below suture. The ribs are crossed by fine, flattened threads. The inner lip is smooth or with two small denticles at each end. The ovate aperture is narrow and measures about 10/23 the total length. The columella is callous. The outer lip is incrassate with 11 short denticles. The wide siphonal canal is very short and straight.

== Distribution ==
This marine species occurs off the Fiji Islands.
