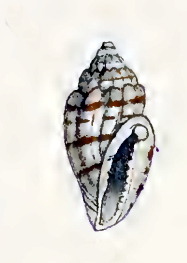
- Original image of a shell of Eucithara harpellina

Scientific classification
- Kingdom: Animalia
- Phylum: Mollusca
- Class: Gastropoda
- Subclass: Caenogastropoda
- Order: Neogastropoda
- Superfamily: Conoidea
- Family: Mangeliidae
- Genus: Eucithara
- Species: E. harpellina

Binomial name
- Eucithara harpellina (Hervier, 1897)

Synonyms
- Cithara harpellina Hervier, 1897 (original combination)

= Eucithara harpellina =

Species of gastropod

Eucithara harpellina is a small sea snail, a marine gastropod mollusk in the family Mangeliidae.

== Description ==
The length of the shell attains 8 mm, its diameter 4 mm.

The shell has an oval subfusiform shape, with a short turriculate and acuminate spire. The crystalline white shell is opaque and matt on the ribs, hyaline shining on the decurring cords. The whorls are tinted with a tan yellow colour, more or less interrupted at the interstices. The last brown bands are usually reduced to enlarged spots on the ridge of the ribs, and are sometimes accompanied by a fifth zone. In the dorsal part, the colouring of the strips becomes darker with a tendency to widen and produce on the penultimate rib a large brown spot. The shell Is decorated with longitudinal ribs, 10 on the body whorl. These are moderately thick and very high. They mark on the upper whorls a space equal to their thickness, which widens at the back of the body whorl. From the suture on, above which they rise, the less prominent ribs descend obliquely flexuously towards the siphonal canal, where they form a cluster of concentric arcs. Cords, somewhat high, narrow and pressed together, run transversely across the whole shell by crossing the ribs. These shiny cords alternate with translucent and matte intervals and offer a graceful effect. They appear under a lens as a very fine lattice, produced by the growth lines.

The spire consists of 6 to 7 whorls, including 1½ whorls in the protoconch. The embryonic whorls are rounded and smooth. The intermediate whorls of the spire are convex, separated by a linear undulating suture, and appear canaliculate by the elevation of the ribs. The body whorl measures about 3/5 of the total height of the shell. It has a rather bulging appearance and its profile is regularly convex. The length of the aperture is equivalent to half the height of the shell. The aperture is narrow, obliquely elongated, with a continuous peristome. The interior of the aperture is of a white porcelain. The columella is oblique and is furrowed by many unequally prominent plicae. The very short, wide siphonal canal deviates slightly back. The outer lip has, seen from the front, a uniformly convex and flexuous profile. It is strongly thickened on the last rib, and we observe, beneath its sharp lip, a bead of enamel on which are inscribed eight folds. The rounded sinus, obliquely open, is situated in the recess of the outer lip, and is strongly thickened.

== Distribution ==
This marine species occurs off New Caledonia, the Loyalty Islands, the Philippines.
