= Eucithara macteola =

Scientific classification
- Kingdom: Animalia
- Phylum: Mollusca
- Class: Gastropoda
- Subclass: Caenogastropoda
- Order: Neogastropoda
- Superfamily: Conoidea
- Family: Mangeliidae
- Genus: Eucithara
- Species: E. macteola

Binomial name
- Eucithara macteola Kilburn, 1992

Species of gastropod

Eucithara macteola is a small sea snail, a marine gastropod mollusk in the family Mangeliidae.

== Description ==
The shell size attains 9.4 mm, its diameter 4.2 mm.

== Distribution ==
This marine species has been found on the inner continental shelf of Zululand, South Africa.
