= Eucithara compressicosta =

Scientific classification
- Domain: Eukaryota
- Kingdom: Animalia
- Phylum: Mollusca
- Class: Gastropoda
- Subclass: Caenogastropoda
- Order: Neogastropoda
- Superfamily: Conoidea
- Family: Mangeliidae
- Genus: Eucithara
- Species: E. compressicosta

Binomial name
- Eucithara compressicosta (Boettger, 1895)

Synonyms
- Cithara compressicosta Boettger, 1895 (original combination)

Species of gastropod

Eucithara compressicosta is a small sea snail, a marine gastropod mollusk in the family Mangeliidae.

== Distribution ==
This marine species is found off the Philippines and the Mariana Islands.

== Description ==
The length of the shell attains 8.2 mm, its diameter 3.4 mm.
