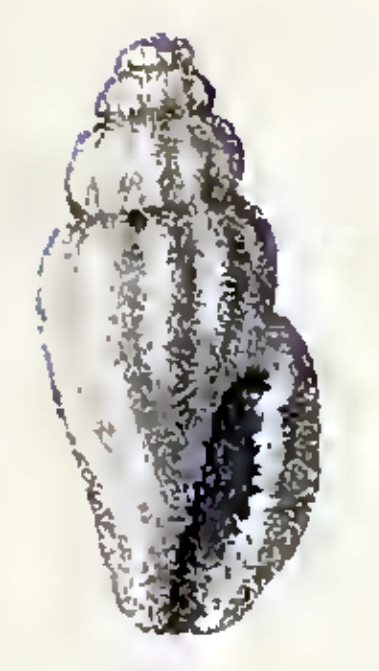
- Original image of a shell of Eucithara eumerista

Scientific classification
- Kingdom: Animalia
- Phylum: Mollusca
- Class: Gastropoda
- Subclass: Caenogastropoda
- Order: Neogastropoda
- Superfamily: Conoidea
- Family: Mangeliidae
- Genus: Eucithara
- Species: E. eumerista

Binomial name
- Eucithara eumerista (Melvill & Standen, 1896)

Synonyms
- Eucithara signa J.C. Melvill & R. Standen, 1896, 1897; Mangilia eumerista Melvill & Standen, 1896 (original combination); Mangilia signum Melvill & Standen, 1896

= Eucithara eumerista =

Species of gastropod

Eucithara eumerista is a small sea snail, a marine gastropod mollusk in the family Mangeliidae.

== Description ==
The length of the shell attains 6 mm, its diameter 2.5 mm.

This is a pure white ovate species, very smooth white and shining. The shell contains 6 whorls, ventricose, roundly longitudinally costate. On the body whorl there are just below the sutures brown spots between the ribs in one transverse line, and also subpellucid linear marking. The outer lip and columella are both much denticled. The sinus is not very deep or conspicuous.

== Distribution ==
This marine species occurs off New Caledonia, the Loyalty Islands and Queensland (Australia).
