= Eucithara ubuhle =

Scientific classification
- Kingdom: Animalia
- Phylum: Mollusca
- Class: Gastropoda
- Subclass: Caenogastropoda
- Order: Neogastropoda
- Superfamily: Conoidea
- Family: Mangeliidae
- Genus: Eucithara
- Species: E. ubuhle

Binomial name
- Eucithara ubuhle Kilburn, 1992

Species of gastropod

Eucithara ubuhle is a small sea snail, a marine gastropod mollusk in the family Mangeliidae.

== Description ==
The shell size attains 14.7 mm,

== Distribution ==
This marine species has been found on the inner continental shelf of KwaZulu, South Africa, and Mozambique.
