= Eucithara interstriata =

- Original image of a shell of Eucithara interstriata

Scientific classification
- Domain: Eukaryota
- Kingdom: Animalia
- Phylum: Mollusca
- Class: Gastropoda
- Subclass: Caenogastropoda
- Order: Neogastropoda
- Superfamily: Conoidea
- Family: Mangeliidae
- Genus: Eucithara
- Species: E. interstriata

Binomial name
- Eucithara interstriata (E. A. Smith, 1876)

Synonyms
- Cythara interstriata E. A. Smith, 1876 (original combination)

Species of gastropod

Eucithara interstriata is a small sea snail, a marine gastropod mollusk in the family Mangeliidae.

== Description ==
The length of the shell attains 7.8 mm, its diameter 3.1 mm.

The shell has an oval-fusiform shape. It contains 8 whorls, of which 2 smooth whorls in the protoconch, the rest are slightly convex.

This species can at once be recognized by the deep-brown suture, the band encircling the middle of the body whorl, which is continuous and not interrupted by the straight longitudinal ribs, and the paler band towards the base. The spiral lirations are almost equidistant, and slightly nodulous on traversing the costae. And the fine striations between them are from two to four in number. The uppermost denticle within the outer lip (that is, the one which borders the little sinus) is somewhat larger than the other 10 denticles. The columella is straight and is furnished with numerous small tubercles and transverse lirations, somewhat irregularly situated, the former, however, being near the exterior margin of the thin callosity which spreads out on the columella, and the latter further within the small and narrow aperture.

== Distribution ==
This marine species occurs off the Solomon Islands.
