= Eucithara perhumerata =

Scientific classification
- Kingdom: Animalia
- Phylum: Mollusca
- Class: Gastropoda
- Subclass: Caenogastropoda
- Order: Neogastropoda
- Superfamily: Conoidea
- Family: Mangeliidae
- Genus: Eucithara
- Species: E. perhumerata

Binomial name
- Eucithara perhumerata Kilburn & Dekker, 2008

Species of gastropod

Eucithara perhumerata is a small sea snail, a marine gastropod mollusc in the family Mangeliidae.

== Description ==
The length of the shell attains 6 mm.

== Distribution ==
This marine species occurs off Yemen.
