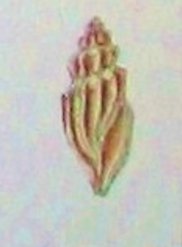
- Original image of a shell of Eucithara nana

Scientific classification
- Kingdom: Animalia
- Phylum: Mollusca
- Class: Gastropoda
- Subclass: Caenogastropoda
- Order: Neogastropoda
- Superfamily: Conoidea
- Family: Mangeliidae
- Genus: Eucithara
- Species: E. nana

Binomial name
- Eucithara nana (Reeve, 1846)

Synonyms
- Mangelia nana Reeve, 1846 (original combination)

= Eucithara nana =

Species of gastropod

Eucithara nana is a small sea snail, a marine gastropod mollusk in the family Mangeliidae.

== Description ==
The length of the shell attains 5.3 mm, its diameter 2.2 mm.

== Distribution ==
This marine species occurs off the Philippines.
