= Eucithara rufolineata =

Scientific classification
- Kingdom: Animalia
- Phylum: Mollusca
- Class: Gastropoda
- Subclass: Caenogastropoda
- Order: Neogastropoda
- Superfamily: Conoidea
- Family: Mangeliidae
- Genus: Eucithara
- Species: E. rufolineata

Binomial name
- Eucithara rufolineata S. Higo. & Y. Goto, 1993

Species of gastropod

Eucithara rufolineata is a small sea snail, a marine gastropod mollusk in the family Mangeliidae.

== Distribution ==
This marine species occurs off Japan
