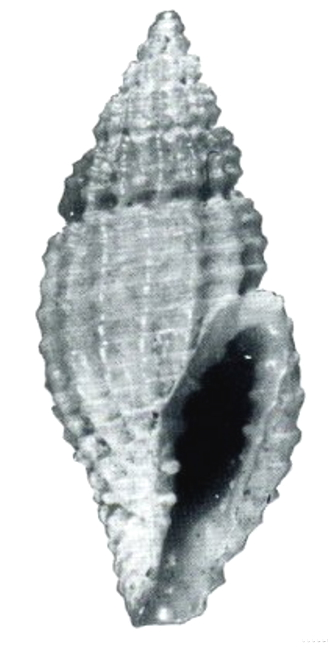
- Apertural view of a shell of Eucithara bathyraphe

Scientific classification
- Domain: Eukaryota
- Kingdom: Animalia
- Phylum: Mollusca
- Class: Gastropoda
- Subclass: Caenogastropoda
- Order: Neogastropoda
- Superfamily: Conoidea
- Family: Mangeliidae
- Genus: Eucithara
- Species: E. bathyraphe

Binomial name
- Eucithara bathyraphe (E. A. Smith, 1882)

Synonyms
- Pleurotoma (Glyphostoma ?) bathyraphe E. A. Smith, 1882 (original combination)

= Eucithara bathyraphe =

Species of gastropod

Eucithara bathyraphe is a small sea snail, a marine gastropod mollusk in the family Mangeliidae.

== Description ==
The length of the shell attains 5.5 mm, its diameter 2.3 mm.

The shell has a nodose-cancellate shape. It contains 7 whorls, including 2½ whorls in the conical protoconch. The ribs are straight with strong spiral cords and traces of microscopic threads. The outer lip is incrassate and shows 7 small plicae. The aperture is narrow and measures half the total length of the shell. The columella is a callous. The siphonal canal is narrow and very short.

== Distribution ==
This marine species occurs off the Philippines.
