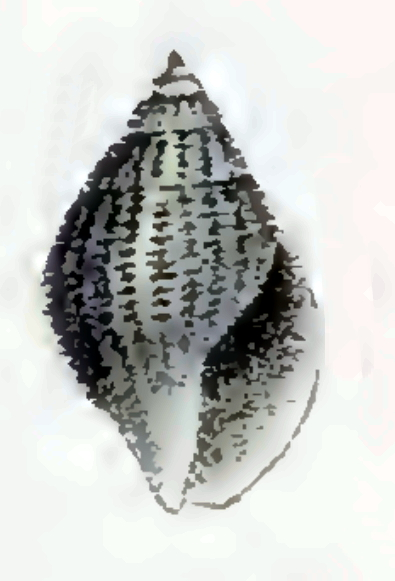
- Original image of a shell of Eucithara abbreviata

Scientific classification
- Kingdom: Animalia
- Phylum: Mollusca
- Class: Gastropoda
- Subclass: Caenogastropoda
- Order: Neogastropoda
- Superfamily: Conoidea
- Family: Mangeliidae
- Genus: Eucithara
- Species: E. abbreviata

Binomial name
- Eucithara abbreviata (Garrett, 1873)

Synonyms
- Cithara abbreviata Garrett, 1873 (original combination)

= Eucithara abbreviata =

Species of gastropod

Eucithara abbreviata is a small sea snail, a marine gastropod mollusk in the family Mangeliidae.

== Description ==
The length of the shell attains 5.5 mm.

(Original description) The shell of this very rare species is small, abbreviate, sub-rhomboidal, solid and, white. The spire is short, pyramidal, the outline flattened, the apex subacute. It contains 7 flat whorls, the body whorl very large, ventricose, depressed beneath the suture, subangulated on the shoulder and rapidly tapering to the base. The surface is cancellated by small close longitudinal ribs and five transverse raised lines. The aperture is narrow and sub-elliptical, a little more than half the length of the shell. The sinus is semicircular. The peristome is trenchant, stoutly ribbed externally, and the inner margin callous. The columella is slightly concave, smooth, thinly callous.

Its most obvious character is its short subrhomboid contour, short body, and its cancellated surface.

== Distribution ==
This marine species occurs off Paumotus, Polynesia, and off the Philippines
