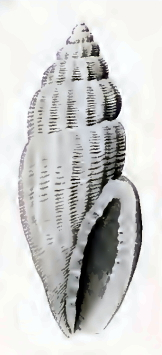
- Original image of a shell of Eucithara moraria

Scientific classification
- Kingdom: Animalia
- Phylum: Mollusca
- Class: Gastropoda
- Subclass: Caenogastropoda
- Order: Neogastropoda
- Superfamily: Conoidea
- Family: Mangeliidae
- Genus: Eucithara
- Species: E. moraria

Binomial name
- Eucithara moraria Hedley, 1922

= Eucithara moraria =

Species of gastropod

Eucithara moraria is a small sea snail, a marine gastropod mollusk in the family Mangeliidae.

== Description ==
The shell length attains 9 mm; its diameter 3.5 mm.

(Original description) The shell is small and subcylindrical. Its colour is blackish brown, the apex and bands on the lip are buff. The shell contains 7 whorls, the upper short, well rounded, the last flatter, half the length of the shell. Sculpture:— Riblets are set at the rate of about eighteen to a whorl, more than the breadth of each apart, incurved at the suture, those above more prominent, on the body whorl decreasing in height, and gradually vanishing on the base. Both riblets and intercostal spaces are closely encircled by alternately larger and smaller threads, which are in turn grained by finer radial lines. The aperture is narrow. It has a well developed external varix, slightly incised by a posterior notch. Within the outer lip are a few small denticules, and on the inner lip fourteen short entering ridges.

== Distribution ==
This marine genus is endemic to Australia and occurs off Queensland.
