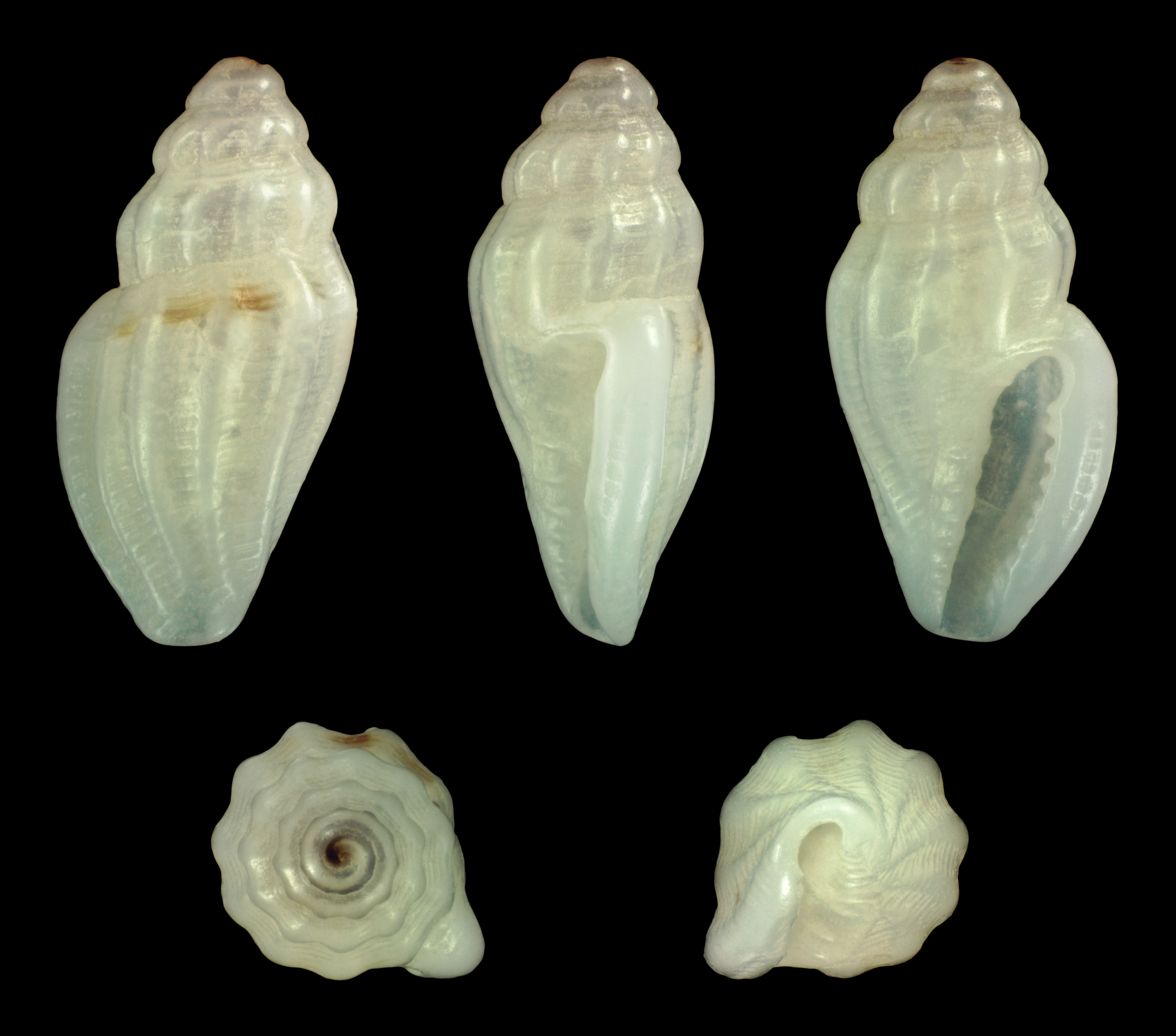
- Original image of a shell of Eucithara capillata

Scientific classification
- Kingdom: Animalia
- Phylum: Mollusca
- Class: Gastropoda
- Subclass: Caenogastropoda
- Order: Neogastropoda
- Superfamily: Conoidea
- Family: Mangeliidae
- Genus: Eucithara
- Species: E. capillata

Binomial name
- Eucithara capillata (Hervier, 1897)

Synonyms
- Cithara capillata Hervier, 1897 (original combination); Mangilia capillata (Hervier, 1897)

= Eucithara capillata =

Species of gastropod

Eucithara capillata is a small sea snail, a marine gastropod mollusk in the family Mangeliidae.

== Description ==
The length of the shell varies between 5 mm and 8 mm.

The shell has an oval-fusiform shape and is acuminate at both ends. The shell is rather thickened and is of a dull crystalline white color. The 4 to 5 top decurring striae are tinted brown on their ridge. These striae are rather fine. The shell is sculpted by vertical and decurrent ribs. These number 8 to 9 at the penultimate whorl. They are thick, prominent and low,. They are weak at the suture, where they originate, swell towards the middle of the whorl, where they form (seen in profile) an obtuse angle, and terminate only at the base of the shell. The short and acuminate spire contains about 7 whorls, separated by a linear sinuate suture. The embryonic whorls are missing from the samples received; The upper whorls present a slightly convex profile, obtusely angular towards the base. The penultimate whorl is convex, the angulation occurs in the middle. The body whorl measures 2/3 of the total height. The dorsal part is mottled with pale yellow, and, on the last rib below the angle, one can see 3 dots of a slightly tinted fawn color. The aperture is semi-oval, directed slightly obliquely. The peristome is continuous; The inside is enamelled brilliant white. The very oblique columella is rectilinear, remarkably furrowed by a dozen folds. The outer lip has a convex profile, rather bulging, and is flexibly arcuate in the plane of the opening; It is thickened on the last rib. The sinus, situated obliquely a little below the suture, is rounded, and not deeply entering into the thickness of the outer lip.

== Distribution ==
This marine species occurs off New Caledonia, the Loyalty Islands, the Philippines and Queensland (Australia).
