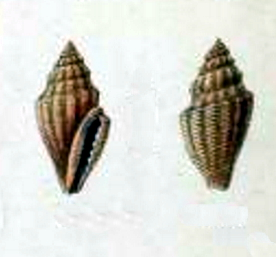
- Original image of a shell of Eucithara ringens

Scientific classification
- Kingdom: Animalia
- Phylum: Mollusca
- Class: Gastropoda
- Subclass: Caenogastropoda
- Order: Neogastropoda
- Superfamily: Conoidea
- Family: Mangeliidae
- Genus: Eucithara
- Species: E. ringens

Binomial name
- Eucithara ringens (G. B. Sowerby III, 1893)

Synonyms
- Cythara ringens G. B. Sowerby III, 1893 (original combination)

= Eucithara ringens =

Species of gastropod

Eucithara ringens is a small sea snail, a marine gastropod mollusk in the family Mangeliidae.

== Description ==
The length of the shell attains 6.2 mm, its diameter 2.6 mm.

This short shell with an conical shape has an acuminate apex. Its color is white. The shell contains 7 angular whorls. It is delicately sculptured with 8 longitudinally arcuate ribs (12 ribs on the penultimate whorl), latticed by fine, revolving striae (about 23 on the penultimate whorl). The suture is deeply impressed. The aperture is narrow and oblong. The columella is slightly curved and contains a white callus. The thickened outer lip contains 8 denticles, the inner lip has 12 plicae.

== Distribution ==
This marine species occurs off Hong Kong
