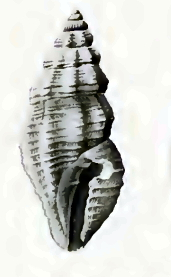
- Original image of a shell of Eucithara miriamica

Scientific classification
- Kingdom: Animalia
- Phylum: Mollusca
- Class: Gastropoda
- Subclass: Caenogastropoda
- Order: Neogastropoda
- Superfamily: Conoidea
- Family: Mangeliidae
- Genus: Eucithara
- Species: E. miriamica

Binomial name
- Eucithara miriamica Hedley, 1922

= Eucithara miriamica =

Species of gastropod

Eucithara miriamica is a small sea snail, a marine gastropod mollusk in the family Mangeliidae.

== Description ==
The length of the shell attains 4.5 mm, its diameter 2 mm.

The small, solid shell has a cylindro-conic shape. Its colour is ferruginous, with an ochraceous orange band on the shoulder. Another specimen is uniform orange, except the varix, which is ferruginous. The shell contains 7 whorls, including a protoconch of 2 1/2 whorls. Sculpture: The protoconch is at first smooth, afterwards ornamented by numerous fine arcuate riblets, which end abruptly. The adult whorls carry from eight to nine prominent spaced ribs. These are crossed by distant spiral threads, of which there are twenty on the body whorl, and six on the penultimate whorl. The whole is overrun by fine radial lines of minute grains. The aperture is protected by a strong varix, in which a semicircular sinus is excavated. On each side of the sinus is a tubercle, and but a single plait on the upper part of the columella.

== Distribution ==
This marine genus is endemic to Australia and occurs off Queensland.
