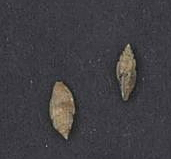
- Shells of Eucithara typica (museum specimens at Naturalis Biodiversity Center)

Scientific classification
- Kingdom: Animalia
- Phylum: Mollusca
- Class: Gastropoda
- Subclass: Caenogastropoda
- Order: Neogastropoda
- Superfamily: Conoidea
- Family: Mangeliidae
- Genus: Eucithara
- Species: E. typica

Binomial name
- Eucithara typica (E. A. Smith, 1884)

Synonyms
- Cithara typica E. A. Smith, 1884 (original combination); Daphnella (Cithara) typica (E. A. Smith, 1884)

= Eucithara typica =

Species of gastropod

Eucithara typica is a small sea snail, a marine gastropod mollusk in the family Mangeliidae.

== Description ==
The length of the shell attains 6.5 mm, its diameter 2.5 mm.

The shell has a slightly fusiform shape with a narrow base. Its color is white with spiral yellowish bands (5 in the body whorl). The spiral banding is not very apparent. The shell contains 7 whorls, of which three smooth conical whorls in the protoconch. The rest are strongly convex with a shallow suture. The 7 axial ribs (9–10 on the penultimate whorl) are high, strong and compressed and are narrower than the intervals, not becoming weak below suture. The ribs are crossed by fine, flattened lirae (12 on the penultimate whorl). Under a microscope some of the very small spiral lirations are seen to be minutely granulated. The inner lip is smooth or with small denticles or weak ridges. The ovate aperture is narrow and measures about 5/11 the total length. The columella is straight and shows a 7-8 transverse folds. The outer lip is incrassate with 8 denticles. The wide siphonal canal is short and straight.

== Distribution ==
The type locality is unknown. The shown specimens were found off Mauritius.
