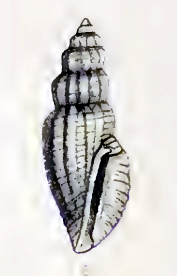
- Original image of a shell of Eucithara dealbata

Scientific classification
- Domain: Eukaryota
- Kingdom: Animalia
- Phylum: Mollusca
- Class: Gastropoda
- Subclass: Caenogastropoda
- Order: Neogastropoda
- Superfamily: Conoidea
- Family: Mangeliidae
- Genus: Eucithara
- Species: E. dealbata

Binomial name
- Eucithara dealbata (Hervier, 1897)

Synonyms
- Mangilia dealbata Hervier, 1897 (original combination)

= Eucithara dealbata =

Species of gastropod

Eucithara dealbata is a small sea snail, a marine gastropod mollusk in the family Mangeliidae.

== Description ==
The length of the shell attains 11 mm, its diameter 4 mm.

The shell has a fusiform shape, ovally elongated, acuminate at both ends, with turriculated whorls. The rather thickened shell has a translucent crystal white color, when fresh. Longitudinal ribs originate at the suture. They are rather thin and high. These ribs (numbering 11 on the penultimate whorl), are frail, rounded. Fine and close striae (best seen under a magnifying glass) are distributed over the whole shell The relatively high shell consists of 8 whorls, separated by a sinuate suture. The 3 embryonic whorls in the protoconch are rounded, polished and brilliant. The next whorls are angular in their upper part. The body whorl measures about half the total length of the shell. Obtusely angular at the top, it offers a convex acuminate profile up to the base of the shell where it undergoes a slight compression. The siphonal canal is short, slightly reversed and recurved to the side of the outer lip. The aperture which does not reach half the total height is slightly oblique and narrowly suboval; The peristome is continuous. The columella is entirely smooth and is coated with a light enamel that thickens at the junction of the outer lip Slightly angular towards the suture, the outer lip, seen from the front, has a regular convex profile. In the plane of the aperture it is arched and slightly flexuous. Strongly thickened on the last rib, it has a crenate and sharp lip, and its interior is completely smooth. The sinus, located a little below the suture, is narrow, deeply seated in the apertural aileron, almost perpendicularly at the aperture.

== Distribution ==
This marine species occurs off New Caledonia and the Loyalty Islands
