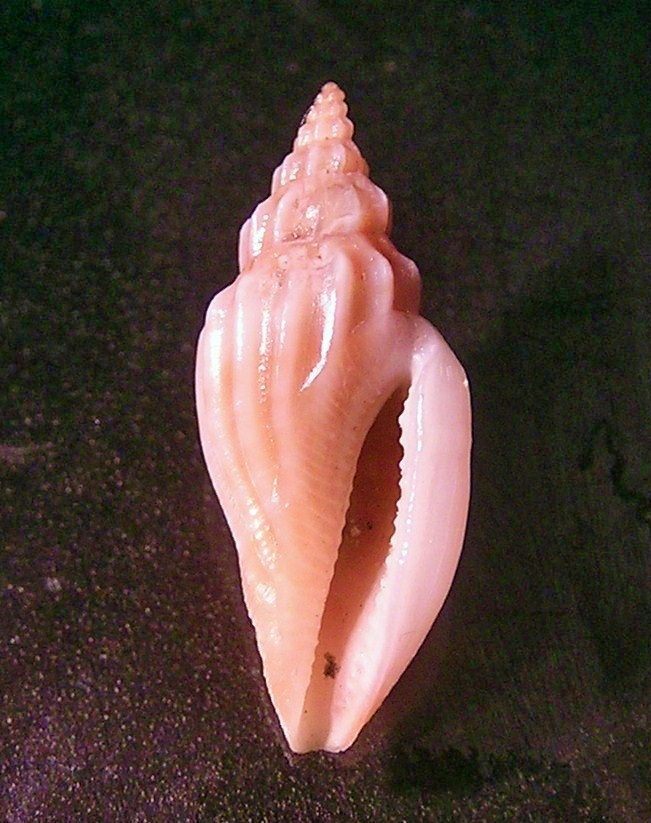
- Shell of Eucithara vexillum

Scientific classification
- Kingdom: Animalia
- Phylum: Mollusca
- Class: Gastropoda
- Subclass: Caenogastropoda
- Order: Neogastropoda
- Superfamily: Conoidea
- Family: Mangeliidae
- Genus: Eucithara; Fischer, 1883

Type species
- Mangelia stromboides Reeve, 1846

Species
- See text

Synonyms
- Mangilia (Eucithara) P. Fischer, 1883 (original rank)

= Eucithara =

Genus of gastropods

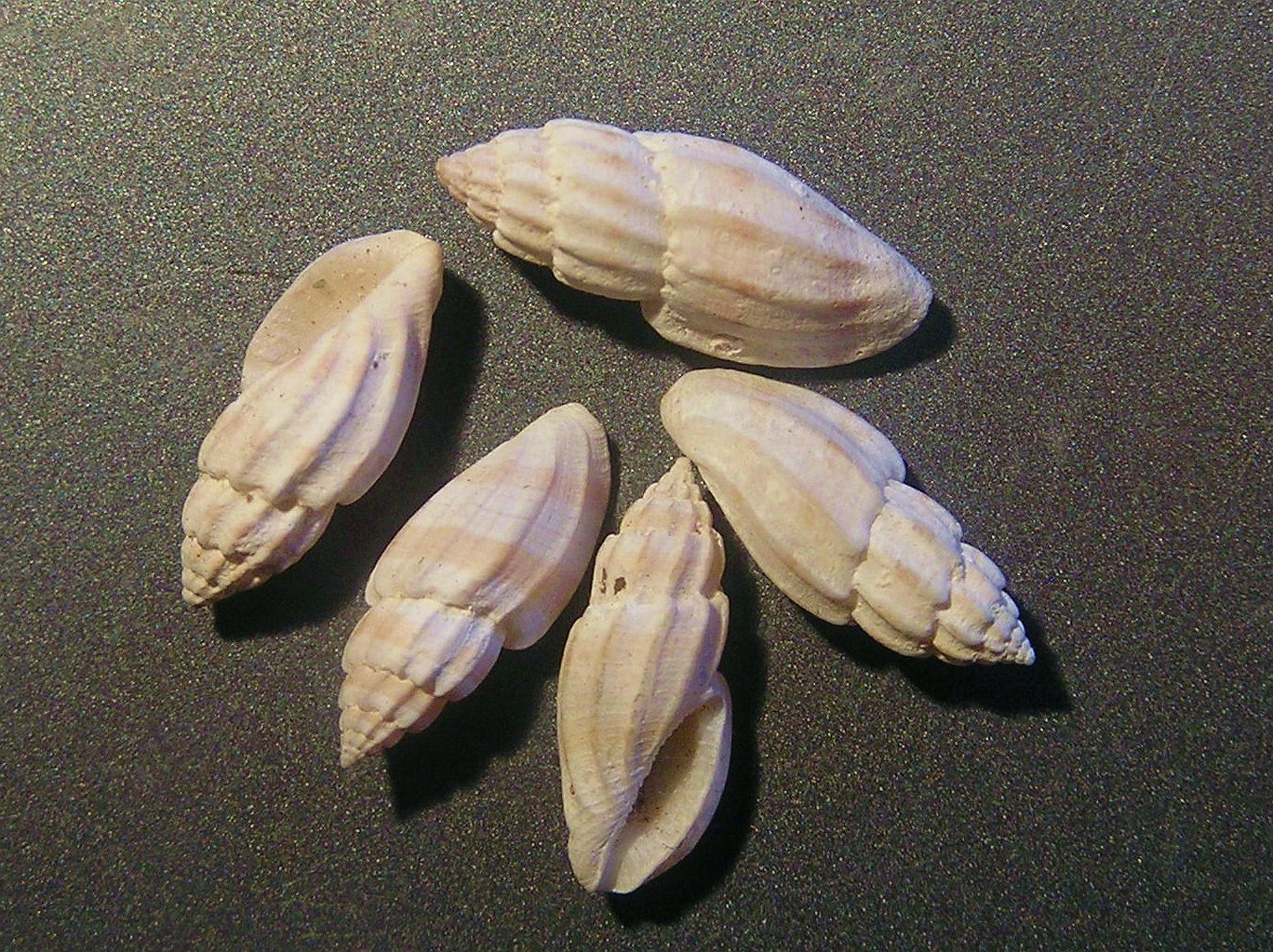
Shells of Eucithara coronata

Eucithara is a genus of small to quite large sea snails, marine gastropod mollusks in the family Mangeliidae.

This genus has been a convenient dumping ground for many Indo-Pacific species. A profound study is still lacking and polyphyly probably occurs, as shown by the radulae of the few species examined.

== Description ==
Species in this genus show a rather solid turreted-fusiform shell, sculptured by bold longitudinal ribs, over-run by dense spiral threads, and decussated by an even finer radial striatum. The aperture is as long, or longer, than the spire, fortified externally by a stout varix which ascends the previous whorl, includes a semi-circular sinus, and extends a free edge over the mouth. Within the outer lip are a series of short entering ridges, and the columella bears a corresponding series of deeply entering horizontal bars.

== Distribution ==
This genus has a wide distribution in the Red Sea, the Persian Gulf, the Indian Ocean, the Pacific Ocean, the East China Sea; off Australia (Northern Territory, Queensland, Tasmania, Western Australia).

== Species ==
According to the World Register of Marine Species (WoRMS), the following species with accepted names are included within the genus Eucithara

- Eucithara abakcheutos Kilburn, 1992
- Eucithara abbreviata (Garrett, 1873)
- Eucithara alacris Hedley, 1922
- Eucithara albivestis (Pilsbry, 1934)
- Eucithara amabilis (Nevill & Nevill, 1874)
- Eucithara angela (Adams & Angas, 1864)
- Eucithara angiostoma (Pease, 1868)
- Eucithara antillarum (Reeve, 1846)
- Eucithara arenivaga Hedley, 1922
- Eucithara articulata (Sowerby III, 1894)
- Eucithara bascauda (Melvill & Standen, 1896)
- Eucithara bathyraphe (Smith E. A., 1882)
- Eucithara bicolor (Reeve, 1846)
- Eucithara bisacchii (Hornung & Mermod, 1929)
- Eucithara brocha Hedley, 1922
- Eucithara caledonica (Smith E. A., 1882)
- Eucithara capillaris Kilburn & Dekker, 2008
- Eucithara capillata (Hervier, 1897)
- Eucithara castanea (Reeve, 1846)
- Eucithara cazioti (Preston, 1905)
- Eucithara celebensis (Hinds, 1843)
- Eucithara cincta (Reeve, 1846)
- Eucithara cinnamomea (Hinds, 1843)
- Eucithara columbelloides (Reeve, 1846)
- Eucithara compressicosta (Boettger, 1895)
- Eucithara coniformis (Reeve, 1846)
- Eucithara conohelicoides (Reeve, 1846)
- Eucithara coronata (Hinds, 1843)
- Eucithara crystallina (Hervier, 1897)
- Eucithara dealbata (R.P.J. Hervier, 1897)
- Eucithara debilis (Pease, 1868)
- Eucithara decussata (Pease, 1868)
- Eucithara delacouriana (Crosse, 1869)
- Eucithara diaglypha (Hervier, 1897)
- Eucithara dubiosa (Nevill & Nevill, 1875)
- Eucithara duplaris (Melvill, 1923)
- Eucithara edithae (Melvill & Standen, 1901)
- Eucithara elegans (Reeve, 1846)
- Eucithara ella (Thiele, 1925)
- Eucithara eumerista (Melvill & Standen, 1896)
- Eucithara fasciata (L.A. Reeve, 1846)
- Eucithara funebris (Reeve, 1846)
- Eucithara funiculata (Reeve, 1846)
- Eucithara fusiformis (Reeve, 1846)
- Eucithara gevahi Singer, 2012
- Eucithara gibbosa (Reeve, 1846)
- Eucithara gracilis (Reeve, 1846)
- Eucithara gradata (Nevill & Nevill, 1875)
- Eucithara grata (Smith E. A., 1884)
- Eucithara gruveli (Dautzenberg, 1932)
- Eucithara guentheri (Sowerby III, 1893)
- Eucithara harpellina (Hervier, 1897)
- Eucithara hirasei (Pilsbry, 1904)
- Eucithara interstriata (Smith E. A., 1876)
- Eucithara isophanes (R.P.J. Hervier, 1897)
- Eucithara isseli (Nevill & Nevill, 1875)
- Eucithara lamellata (Reeve, 1846)
- Eucithara lepidella (Hervier, 1897)
- Eucithara lota (Gould, 1860)
- Eucithara lyra (Reeve, 1846)
- Eucithara macteola Kilburn, 1992
- Eucithara makadiensis Kilburn & Dekker, 2008
- Eucithara marerosa Kilburn, 1992
- Eucithara marginelloides (Reeve, 1846)
- Eucithara milia (R.A. Philippi, 1851)
- Eucithara miriamica Hedley, 1922
- Eucithara monochoria Hedley, 1922
- Eucithara moraria Hedley, 1922
- Eucithara nana (Reeve, 1846)
- Eucithara nevilliana (Preston, 1904)
- Eucithara novaehollandiae (Reeve, 1846)
- Eucithara obesa (Reeve, 1846)
- Eucithara pagoda (May, 1911)
- Eucithara paucicostata (Pease, 1868)
- Eucithara perhumerata Kilburn & Dekker, 2008
- Eucithara planilabrum (Reeve, 1843)
- Eucithara pulchella (Reeve, 1846)
- Eucithara pulchra Bozzetti, 2009
- Eucithara pusilla (Pease, 1860)
- Eucithara ringens (Sowerby III, 1893)
- Eucithara rufolineata S. Higo & Y. Goto, 1993
- Eucithara seychellarum (Smith E. A., 1884)
- Eucithara solida (Reeve, 1846)
- Eucithara souverbiei (Tryon, 1884)
- Eucithara striatella (Smith E. A., 1884)
- Eucithara striatissima (Sowerby III, 1907)
- Eucithara stromboides (Reeve, 1846)
- Eucithara subglobosa (Hervier, 1897)
- Eucithara subterranea (P.F. Röding, 1798)
- Eucithara tenebrosa (Reeve, 1846)
- Eucithara trivittata (Adams & Reeve, 1850)
- Eucithara turricula (Reeve, 1846)
- Eucithara typhonota (Melvill & Standen, 1901)
- Eucithara typica (Smith E. A., 1884)
- Eucithara ubuhle Kilburn, 1992
- Eucithara unicolor Bozzetti, 2020
- Eucithara unilineata (Smith E. A., 1876)
- Eucithara vexillum (Reeve, 1846)
- Eucithara villaumeae Kilburn & Dekker, 2008
- Eucithara vitiensis (Smith E. A., 1884)
- Eucithara vittata (Hinds, 1843)

Species brought into synonymy

- Eucithara abyssicola (Reeve, 1846) : synonym of Eucithara vittata (Hinds, 1843)
- Eucithara anna F.P. Jousseaume, 1883: synonym of Eucithara novaehollandiae (Reeve, 1846)
- Eucithara balansai J.C.H. Crosse, 1873: synonym of Eucithara angela (A. Adams & G.F. Angas, 1864)
- Eucithara basedowi Hedley, 1918 : synonym of Pseudanachis basedowi (Hedley, 1918)
- Eucithara biclathrata S.M. Souverbie in S.M. Souverbie & R.P. Montrouzier, 1872 : synonym of Eucithara vittata (Hinds, 1843)
- Eucithara brevis W.H. Pease, 1867: synonym of Eucithara coronata cithara (A.A. Gould, 1851)
- Eucithara butonensis (Schepman, 1913): synonym of Cytharopsis butonensis (Schepman, 1913)
- Eucithara capillacea (Reeve, 1846): synonym of Eucithara coronata (Hinds, 1843)
- Eucithara chionea J.C. Melvill & R. Standen, 1899: synonym of Eucithara coronata (Hinds, 1843)
- Eucithara citharella E.A. Smith, 1876: synonym of Eucithara lyra (Reeve, 1846)
- Eucithara compta (Adams & Angas, 1864)synonym of Marita compta (A. Adams & Angas, 1864)
- Eucithara coniformis S.M. Souverbie, 1875: synonym of Eucithara souverbiei (Tryon, 1884)
- Eucithara crassilabrum (Reeve, 1846): synonym of Eucithara novaehollandiae (Reeve, 1846)
- Eucithara cylindrica (Reeve, 1846) : synonym of Gingicithara cylindrica (Reeve, 1846)
- Eucithara daedalea W.H. Pease, 1867: synonym of Eucithara debilis (Pease, 1868)
- Eucithara deliciosa K.H. Barnard, 1959: synonym of Pseudorhaphitoma ichthys (Melvill, J.C., 1910)
- Eucithara effosa P.F. Röding, 1798: synonym of Eucithara subterranea (P.F. Röding, 1798)
- Eucithara eupoecila R.P.J. Hervier, 1897: synonym of Eucithara coronata (Hinds, 1843)
- Eucithara euselma (Melvill & Standen, 1896) : synonym of Gingicithara notabilis (E. A. Smith, 1888)
- Eucithara glariosa (A.A. Gould, 1860): synonym of Cythara glareosa Gould, A.A., 1860
- Eucithara guestieri (Souverbie, 1872): synonym of Eucithara novaehollandiae (L.A. Reeve, 1846)
- Eucithara hornbeckii L.A. Reeve, 1846: synonym of Eucithara coronata (Hinds, 1843)
- Eucithara hypercalles Melvill, J.C., 1898: synonym of Eucithara fusiformis (Reeve, 1846)
- Eucithara iota A.A. Gould, 1860: synonym of Eucithara lota (Gould, 1860)
- Eucithara lyrica (Reeve, 1846 in 1843-65) : synonym of Gingicithara lyrica (Reeve, 1846)
- Eucithara matakuana (Smith, 1884) : synonym of Eucithara delacouriana (Crosse, 1869)
- Eucithara onager (S.M. Souverbie, 1875): synonym of Eucithara conohelicoides (L.A. Reeve, 1846)
- Eucithara optabilis G.B. III Sowerby, 1907: synonym of Eucithara coronata (Hinds, 1843)
- Eucithara pallida (Reeve, 1846): synonym of Eucithara coronata (Hinds, 1843)
- Eucithara pellucida (Reeve, 1846) : synonym of Citharomangelia pellucida (Reeve, 1846)
- Eucithara phyllidis Hedley, 1922 : synonym of Anacithara phyllidis (Hedley, 1922)
- Eucithara pura H.A. Pilsbry, 1904: synonym of Eucithara albivestis (H.A. Pilsbry, 1934)
- Eucithara porcellanea (Kilburn, 1992): synonym of Leiocithara Hedley, 1922
- Eucithara pygmaea G.B. Sowerby, 1846: synonym of Eucithara isseli (Nevill & Nevill, 1875)
- Eucithara quadrilineata (G. B. Sowerby III, 1913): synonym of Citharomangelia quadrilineata (G. B. Sowerby III, 1913)
- Eucithara raffini R.P.J. Hervier, 1897: synonym of Eucithara unilineata (Smith E. A., 1876)
- Eucithara reticulata (Reeve, 1846) : synonym of Eucithara obesa (Reeve, 1846)
- Eucithara rubrocincta E.A. Smith, 1882: synonym of Eucithara vittata (Hinds, 1843)
- Eucithara semizonata (Hervier, 1897): synonym of Eucithara coronata (Hinds, 1843)
- Eucithara signa J.C. Melvill & R. Standen, 1896, 1897: synonym of Eucithara eumerista (Melvill & Standen, 1896)
- Eucithara stellatomoides (Shuto, 1883): synonym of Antiguraleus stellatomoides Shuto, 1983
- Eucithara subgibbosa (Hervier, 1897): synonym of Eucithara coronata (Hinds, 1843)
- Eucithara triticea L.A. Reeve, 1843: synonym of Eucithara angiostoma (W.H. Pease, 1868)
- Eucithara unifasciata (G.P. Deshayes, 1834) : synonym of Mangelia unifasciata (Deshayes, 1835)
- Eucithara waterhousei (Smith E. A., 1884) : synonym of Eucithara coronata (Hinds, 1843)
- Eucithara zonata (Reeve, 1846): synonym of Eucithara coronata (Hinds, 1843)

The Indo-Pacific Molluscan Database adds the following names in current use to the list

- Eucithara cinnamomea cinnamomea (Hinds, 1843-g)
- Eucithara cithara (Gould, 1851): synonym of Eucithara coronata cithara (A.A. Gould, 1851)
- Eucithara gracilis gracilis (Reeve, 1846 in 1843-65)
- Eucithara gracilis striolata (Bouge & Dautzenberg, 1914)
