= Eucithara seychellarum =

Scientific classification
- Domain: Eukaryota
- Kingdom: Animalia
- Phylum: Mollusca
- Class: Gastropoda
- Subclass: Caenogastropoda
- Order: Neogastropoda
- Superfamily: Conoidea
- Family: Mangeliidae
- Genus: Eucithara
- Species: E. seychellarum

Binomial name
- Eucithara seychellarum (E. A. Smith, 1884)

Synonyms
- Cithara seychellarum E. A. Smith, 1884 (original combination)

Species of gastropod

Eucithara seychellarum is a small sea snail, a marine gastropod mollusk in the family Mangeliidae.

== Description ==
The length of the shell attains 13.8 mm, its diameter 5.1 mm.

It's close in appearance to Eucithara fusiformis (Reeve, 1846) from which the slight fusiform shell may be distinguished by the sharper angulation of the whorls, a more attenuation of the body whorl, a finer liration on the straight columella and the slightly longer spire. The slight sinus towards the lower part of the incrassate outer lip is comparatively conspicuous. It is white with red dots between the whorls. It contains 8 whorls, angulated in the upper part and slightly convex below. It shows narrow sharply angulated ribs, 10 on the penultimate whorl and 11 in the body whorl. The ribs are crossed by fine, flattened striae. The narrow aperture measures about half the total length of the shell.

== Distribution ==
This marine species occurs off the Seychelles.
