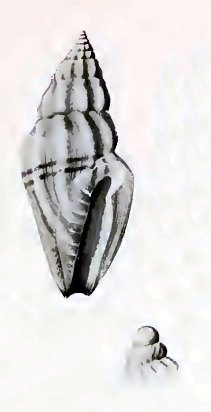
- Original image of the shell and protoconch of Eucithara arenivaga

Scientific classification
- Kingdom: Animalia
- Phylum: Mollusca
- Class: Gastropoda
- Subclass: Caenogastropoda
- Order: Neogastropoda
- Superfamily: Conoidea
- Family: Mangeliidae
- Genus: Eucithara
- Species: E. arenivaga

Binomial name
- Eucithara arenivaga Hedley, 1922

= Eucithara arenivaga =

Species of gastropod

Eucithara arenivaga is a small sea snail, a marine gastropod mollusk in the family Mangeliidae.

== Description ==
The shell length varies between 6 mm and 15 mm.

(Original description) The solid shell has a biconical shape and is slightly constricted around the upper part of each whorl. It contains 9 whorls. Its color is lavender-gray, with a broad peripheral band of buff descending the spire, and on the body whorl underlined by a single or double chocolate line. The lip is buff. The interior is ochraceous brown.

The protoconch consists of two small helicoid whorls. Sculpture:—The first whorl is keeled, and develops small radial ribs. On subsequent whorls the ribs amount to about ten, not continuous from one whorl to the next, bent, and thickened on the shoulder, thence quickly tapering to the suture, continuing in the opposite direction to the base of the body whorl. The whole shell is over-run by microscopic spiral threads, alternately larger and smaller. Aperture :—The mouth is narrow, oblong, protected by a stout varix which ascends the previous whorl, and in which is excavated a shallow semicircular sinus. The outer lip has a very narrow free margin, within which are about eight small inconspicuous teeth. The columella is overlaid by a thick callus sheet with a definite margin, across it extend ten plications. The siphonal canal is a mere notch.

== Distribution ==
This marine species occurs off Australia (Queensland ), and off the Philippines.
