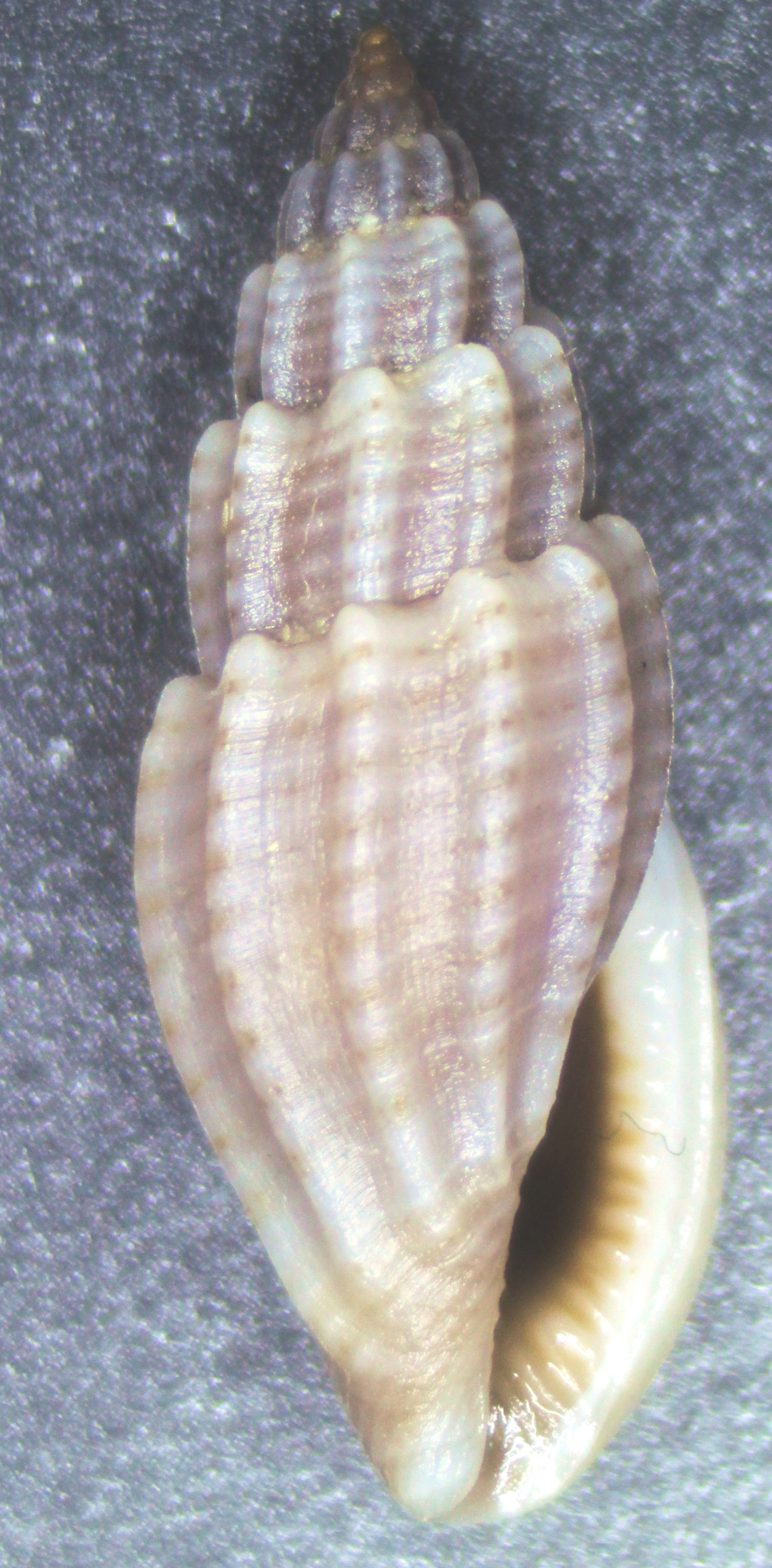
- Apertural view of a shell of Eucithara debilis

Scientific classification
- Kingdom: Animalia
- Phylum: Mollusca
- Class: Gastropoda
- Subclass: Caenogastropoda
- Order: Neogastropoda
- Superfamily: Conoidea
- Family: Mangeliidae
- Genus: Eucithara
- Species: E. debilis

Binomial name
- Eucithara debilis (Pease, 1868)

Synonyms
- Cythara debilis Pease, 1868; Eucithara daedalea W.H. Pease, 1867

= Eucithara debilis =

Species of gastropod

Eucithara debilis is a small sea snail, a marine gastropod mollusk in the family Mangeliidae.

== Distribution ==
This marine species is found off Paumotus, Polynesia, and off Guam.

== Description ==
The length of the shell attains 6 mm.

The shell is narrowly angulated at the suture, from which descend about ten longitudinal ribs, closely and finely crossed by revolving striae. Its color is white. The back of the body whorl is stained with chestnut.
