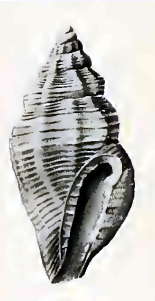
- Original image of a shell of Eucithara monochoria

Scientific classification
- Kingdom: Animalia
- Phylum: Mollusca
- Class: Gastropoda
- Subclass: Caenogastropoda
- Order: Neogastropoda
- Superfamily: Conoidea
- Family: Mangeliidae
- Genus: Eucithara
- Species: E. monochoria

Binomial name
- Eucithara monochoria Hedley, 1922

= Eucithara monochoria =

Species of gastropod

Eucithara monochoria is a small sea snail, a marine gastropod mollusk in the family Mangeliidae.

== Description ==
The shell length attains 5 mm; its diameter 2 mm.

(Original description) The small, stout, solid shell has a biconical shape. Its colour is russet-brown, with a definite buff band on the shoulder covering three spirals, and a less definite buff band on the base. The penultimate, antepenultimate whorls, and varix also buff. The shell contains 6½ whorls, of which 2½ compose the sharply differentiated protoconch. Sculpture -The earlier whorls of the protoconch are smooth, and the last has about twenty delicate radial riblets. The ribs on the adult shell are broad, prominent, perpendicular, and discontinuous, at first eleven, at last nine. Both ribs and interstices are traversed by flat-topped elevated spirals, spaced more than their breadth apart, on the body whorl twenty-five, on the penultimate eight. The spirals are grained by the passage of fine radial striae. The aperture : A substantial varix stretches a free limb over the mouth. Beneath it are six small tubercles. On the inner lip are ten entering plaits.

== Distribution ==
This marine genus is endemic to Australia and occurs off Queensland
