= Eucithara gevahi =

Scientific classification
- Kingdom: Animalia
- Phylum: Mollusca
- Class: Gastropoda
- Subclass: Caenogastropoda
- Order: Neogastropoda
- Superfamily: Conoidea
- Family: Mangeliidae
- Genus: Eucithara
- Species: E. gevahi

Binomial name
- Eucithara gevahi Singer, 2012

Species of gastropod

Eucithara gevahi is a small sea snail, a marine gastropod mollusk in the family Mangeliidae.

== Distribution ==
This marine species occurs in the Gulf of Aqaba, Northern Red Sea
