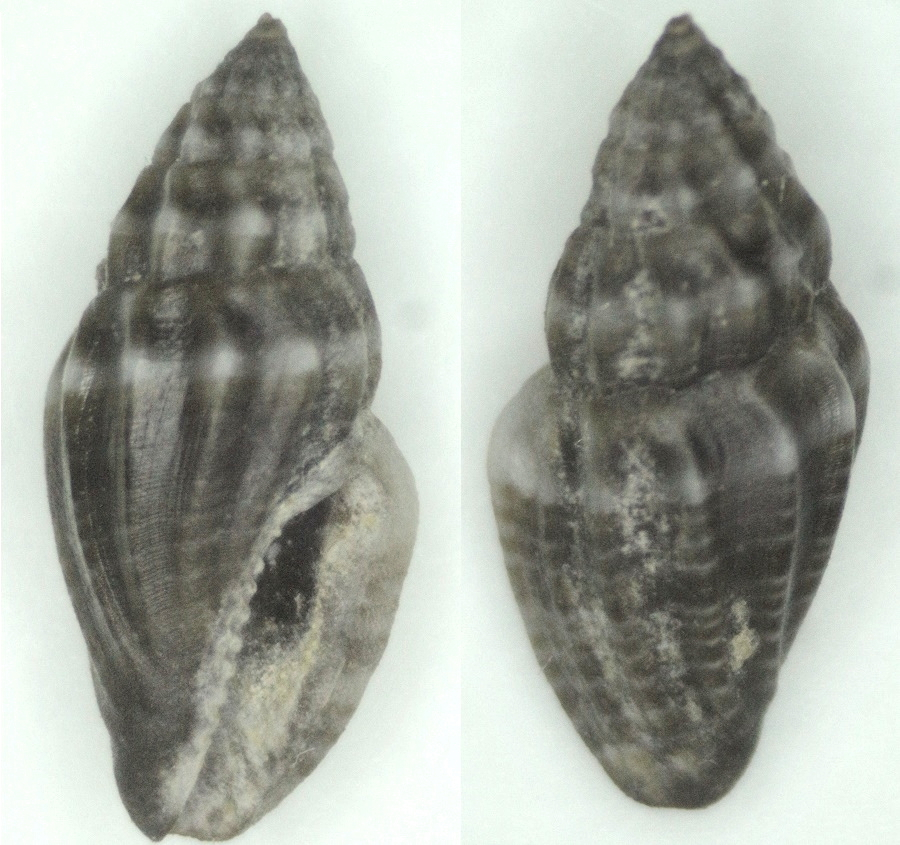
- Shell of Eucithara columbelloides

Scientific classification
- Kingdom: Animalia
- Phylum: Mollusca
- Class: Gastropoda
- Subclass: Caenogastropoda
- Order: Neogastropoda
- Superfamily: Conoidea
- Family: Mangeliidae
- Genus: Eucithara
- Species: E. columbelloides

Binomial name
- Eucithara columbelloides (Reeve, 1846)

Synonyms
- Mangelia columbelloides Reeve, 1846 (original combination)

= Eucithara columbelloides =

Species of gastropod

Eucithara columbelloides is a small sea snail, a marine gastropod mollusc in the family Mangeliidae.

== Description ==
The length of the shell varies between 6 mm and 10 mm.

== Distribution ==
This marine species occurs off the Philippines and Western Samoa.
