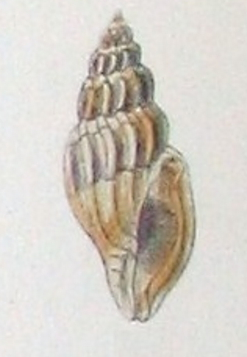
- Shell of Eucithara funebris

Scientific classification
- Kingdom: Animalia
- Phylum: Mollusca
- Class: Gastropoda
- Subclass: Caenogastropoda
- Order: Neogastropoda
- Superfamily: Conoidea
- Family: Mangeliidae
- Genus: Eucithara
- Species: E. funebris

Binomial name
- Eucithara funebris (Reeve, 1846)

Synonyms
- Mangelia funebris Reeve, 1846 (original combination)

= Eucithara funebris =

Species of gastropod

Eucithara funebris is a small sea snail, a marine gastropod mollusc in the family Mangeliidae.

== Description ==
The length of the shell varies between 9–11 millimetres (0.35–0.43 in).

The shell has a smooth appearance. The ribs are rather solid, obtuse, with wider interspaces. The color of the shell is yellowish brown, broad banded with chestnut. The ribs are lighter colored than the interstices.

== Distribution ==
This marine species occurs off the Philippines.
