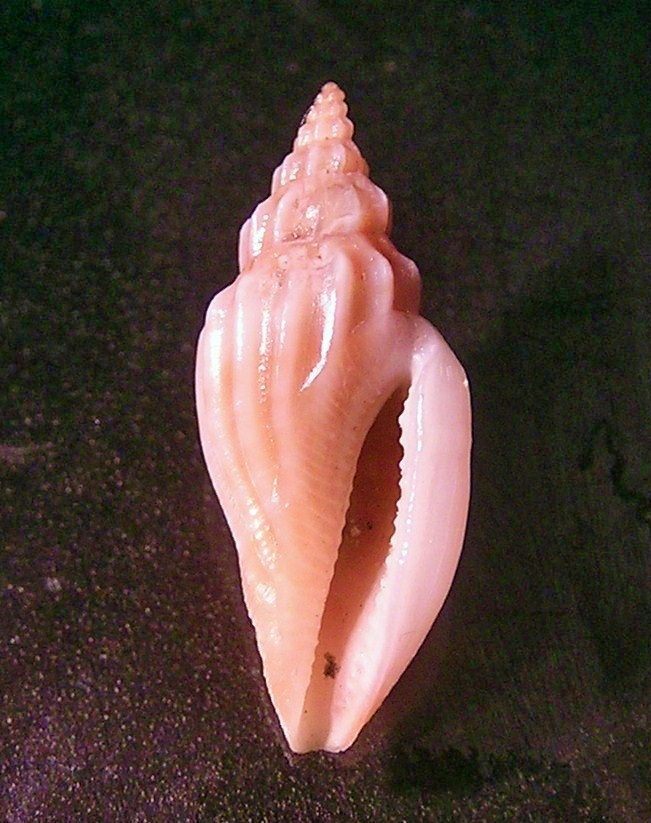
- Shell of Eucithara vexillum

Scientific classification
- Kingdom: Animalia
- Phylum: Mollusca
- Class: Gastropoda
- Subclass: Caenogastropoda
- Order: Neogastropoda
- Superfamily: Conoidea
- Family: Mangeliidae
- Genus: Eucithara
- Species: E. vexillum

Binomial name
- Eucithara vexillum (Reeve, 1846)

Synonyms
- Cithara vexillum Hidalgo, 1904; Mangelia vexillum Reeve, 1846 (original combination)

= Eucithara vexillum =

Species of gastropod

Eucithara vexillum is a small sea snail, a marine gastropod mollusk in the family Mangeliidae.

== Description ==
The length of the shell attains 11 mm.

The whorls are nodulous at the shoulder, with ribs descending from the nodules. The entire surface of the shell is decussately striated, as if very finely granulated. The color of the shell is orange-yellow, with a number of narrow whitish bands.

== Distribution ==
This marine species occurs in the Central Pacific off Fiji. and Queensland (Australia).
