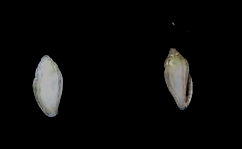
- Shells of Eucithara amabilis (museum specimens at Naturalis Biodiversity Center)

Scientific classification
- Kingdom: Animalia
- Phylum: Mollusca
- Class: Gastropoda
- Subclass: Caenogastropoda
- Order: Neogastropoda
- Superfamily: Conoidea
- Family: Mangeliidae
- Genus: Eucithara
- Species: E. amabilis

Binomial name
- Eucithara amabilis (G. Nevill & H. Nevill, 1874)

Synonyms
- Cithara amabilis Nevill & Nevill, 1874 (original combination); Daphnella (Cithara) amabilis

= Eucithara amabilis =

Species of gastropod

Eucithara amabilis is a small sea snail, a marine gastropod mollusk in the family Mangeliidae.

== Distribution ==
This marine species occurs in the Indian Ocean off Mauritius.
