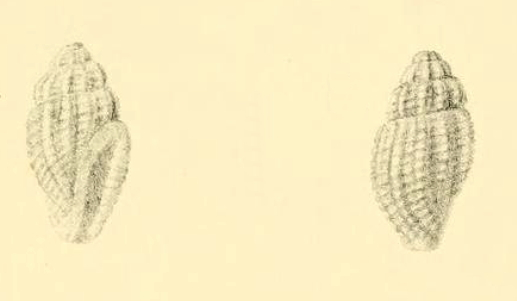
- Original drawing of a shell of Eucithara nevilliana

Scientific classification
- Kingdom: Animalia
- Phylum: Mollusca
- Class: Gastropoda
- Subclass: Caenogastropoda
- Order: Neogastropoda
- Superfamily: Conoidea
- Family: Mangeliidae
- Genus: Eucithara
- Species: E. nevilliana

Binomial name
- Eucithara nevilliana (Preston, 1904)

Synonyms
- Cythara nevilliana Preston, 1904 (original combination)

= Eucithara nevilliana =

Species of gastropod

Eucithara nevilliana is a small sea snail, a marine gastropod mollusk in the family Mangeliidae.

== Description ==
The length of the shell attains 5 mm, its diameter 2.5 mm.

(Original description) The shell is subfusiform and solid with an obtuse apex, characterized by a uniformly white coloration. It consists of 5 to 6 convex whorls separated by an impressed suture. The sculpture is notably robust, featuring a combination of coarse ribs and spiral grooves that intersect to give the shell a distinct cancellated (lattice-like) appearance.

The aperture is high and narrow in form. The columella is curved and exhibits a somewhat rough texture. The peristome (outer lip) is slightly thickened and bent inward over the aperture; its edge is uniquely serrated, a result of the prominent external spiral grooves reaching the margin.

== Distribution ==
This marine species occurs off Sri Lanka.
