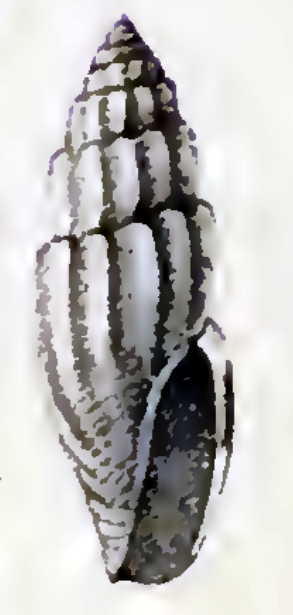
- Original image of a shell of Eucithara typhonota

Scientific classification
- Kingdom: Animalia
- Phylum: Mollusca
- Class: Gastropoda
- Subclass: Caenogastropoda
- Order: Neogastropoda
- Superfamily: Conoidea
- Family: Mangeliidae
- Genus: Eucithara
- Species: E. typhonota

Binomial name
- Eucithara typhonota (Melvill & Standen, 1901)

Synonyms
- Cythara typhonota Melvill & Standen, 1901 (original combination)

= Eucithara typhonota =

Species of gastropod

Eucithara typhonota is a small sea snail, a marine gastropod mollusk in the family Mangeliidae.

The holotype in the British Museum of Natural History is a juvenile form. This raises questions about the validity of this species.

== Description ==
The length of the shell attains 8 mm, its diameter 1.5 mm.

The solid, gradated shell has an ovate shape. It is white with a smoky black spiral dorsal band, most conspicuous just behind the outer lip. It contains 8 whorls, impressed at the suture. The teleoconch shows a few rectilineal ribs, of which 12 in the body whorl. The aperture is narrow and oblong. The outer lip is simple (juvenile). The white columella is rather straight

== Distribution ==
This marine species occurs in the Persian Gulf.
