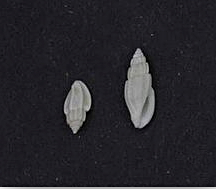
- Shell of Eucithara turricula (museum specimen at Naturalis Biodiversity Center)

Scientific classification
- Kingdom: Animalia
- Phylum: Mollusca
- Class: Gastropoda
- Subclass: Caenogastropoda
- Order: Neogastropoda
- Superfamily: Conoidea
- Family: Mangeliidae
- Genus: Eucithara
- Species: E. turricula

Binomial name
- Eucithara turricula (Reeve, 1846)

Synonyms
- Daphnella (Cithara) turricula (Reeve, 1846); Mangelia turricula Reeve, 1846 (original combination)

= Eucithara turricula =

Species of gastropod

Eucithara turricula is a small sea snail, a marine gastropod mollusk in the family Mangeliidae.

== Description ==
The length of the shell attains 12.5 mm; its diameter 4.7 mm.

The whorls are rather flat The sutures are deep. The shoulder is very narrow. The color of the shell is whitish, sometimes with a central brown band, with fine brown revolving lines, invisible except with a lens.

== Distribution ==
This marine species occurs off the Philippines.
