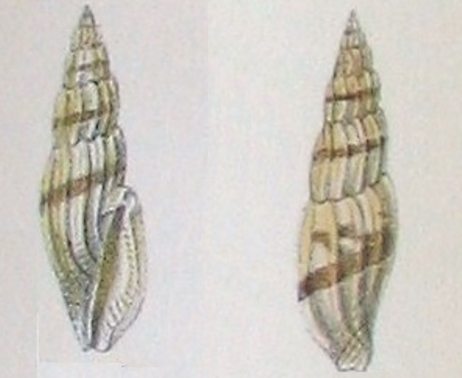
- Shell of Eucithara gracilis

Scientific classification
- Kingdom: Animalia
- Phylum: Mollusca
- Class: Gastropoda
- Subclass: Caenogastropoda
- Order: Neogastropoda
- Superfamily: Conoidea
- Family: Mangeliidae
- Genus: Eucithara
- Species: E. gracilis

Binomial name
- Eucithara gracilis (Reeve, 1846)

Synonyms
- Eucithara gracilis striolata Bouge, J.L. & Ph. Dautzenberg, 1914 (nomen nudum); Mangelia gracilis Reeve, 1846 (original combination)

= Eucithara gracilis =

Species of gastropod

Eucithara gracilis is a small sea snail, a marine gastropod mollusk in the family Mangeliidae.

== Description ==
The length of the shell attains 10 mm.

The ribs are narrow and distant. The interstices show very fine revolving striae. The color of the shell is whitish, with a central chestnut zone, and sometimes additional chestnut blotches.

== Distribution ==
This marine species occurs off the Philippines, the Loyalty Islands and Queensland, Australia.
