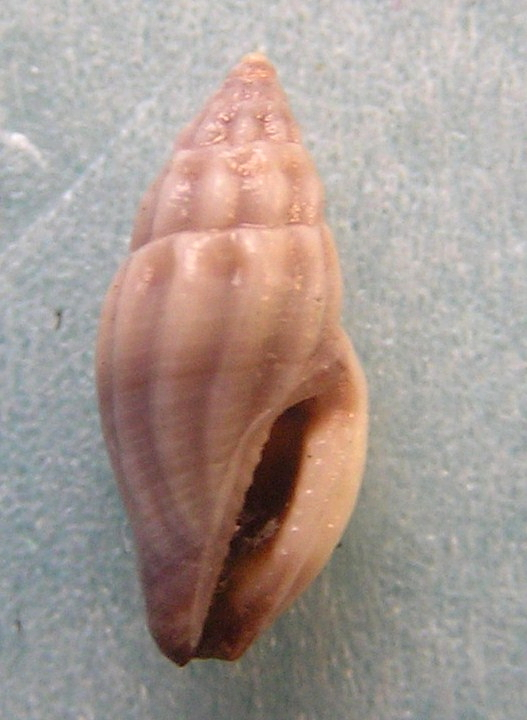
- Apertural view of a shell of Eucithara obesa

Scientific classification
- Kingdom: Animalia
- Phylum: Mollusca
- Class: Gastropoda
- Subclass: Caenogastropoda
- Order: Neogastropoda
- Superfamily: Conoidea
- Family: Mangeliidae
- Genus: Eucithara
- Species: E. obesa

Binomial name
- Eucithara obesa (Reeve, 1846)

Synonyms
- Eucithara reticulata (Reeve, 1846); Mangelia vittata Reeve, L.A., 1846 (renamed); Mangelia obesa Reeve, 1846 (original combination); Mangelia reticulata Reeve, 1846 (Invalid: junior homonym of Mangelia reticulata Risso, 1826; Mangelia obesa is a replacement name)

= Eucithara obesa =

Species of gastropod

Eucithara obesa is a small sea snail, a marine gastropod mollusk in the family Mangeliidae.

== Description ==
The length of the shell attains 11 mm.

The shell is closely ribbed, crossed by numerous revolving striae. Its color is yellowish brown, fasciate with chestnut.

== Distribution ==
This marine species occurs off the Philippines and Guam
