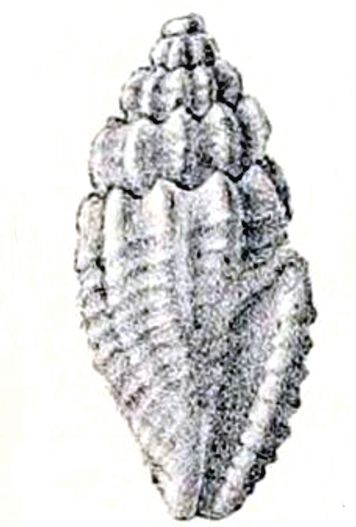
- Original image of a shell of Eucithara cazioti

Scientific classification
- Kingdom: Animalia
- Phylum: Mollusca
- Class: Gastropoda
- Subclass: Caenogastropoda
- Order: Neogastropoda
- Superfamily: Conoidea
- Family: Mangeliidae
- Genus: Eucithara
- Species: E. cazioti

Binomial name
- Eucithara cazioti (Preston, 1905)

Synonyms
- Mangilia (Glyphostoma) cazioti Preston, 1905

= Eucithara cazioti =

Species of gastropod

Eucithara cazioti is a small sea snail, a marine gastropod mollusk in the family Mangeliidae.

== Distribution ==
This marine species occurs in the Indian Ocean and off Sri Lanka.

== Description ==
The length of the shell attains 5 mm.

(Original description) The shell has an ovate fusiform shape. The upper whorls are in flesh colour. The last two are white. A pale brown band appears at the base of the body whorl. The suture is also discoloured by a faint band of the same colour. The shell contains 5 - 6 whorls, sculptured with spiral striae and coarse, somewhat distant transverse ribs which project above the suture. The suture is impressed. The aperture is narrow and oblique. The peristome is thickened and serrated by the spiral striae. The columella descends obliquely.
