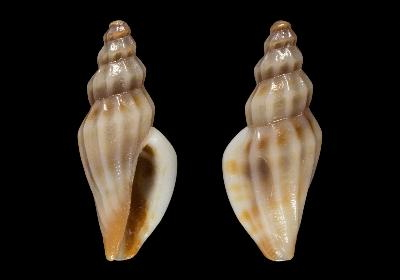
- Shell of Eucithara pulchra (holotype at MNHN, Paris)

Scientific classification
- Kingdom: Animalia
- Phylum: Mollusca
- Class: Gastropoda
- Subclass: Caenogastropoda
- Order: Neogastropoda
- Superfamily: Conoidea
- Family: Mangeliidae
- Genus: Eucithara
- Species: E. pulchra

Binomial name
- Eucithara pulchra Bozzetti, 2009

= Eucithara pulchra =

Species of gastropod

Eucithara pulchra is a small sea snail, a marine gastropod mollusc in the family Mangeliidae.

== Distribution ==
This marine species occurs off Madagascar.
