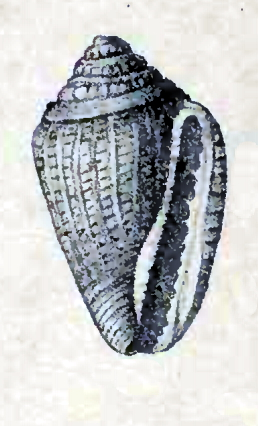
- Image of a shell of Eucithara dubiosa

Scientific classification
- Kingdom: Animalia
- Phylum: Mollusca
- Class: Gastropoda
- Subclass: Caenogastropoda
- Order: Neogastropoda
- Superfamily: Conoidea
- Family: Mangeliidae
- Genus: Eucithara
- Species: E. dubiosa

Binomial name
- Eucithara dubiosa (G. Nevill & H. Nevill, 1875)

Synonyms
- Cythara dubiosa Nevill & Nevill, 1875 (original combination)

= Eucithara dubiosa =

Species of gastropod

Eucithara dubiosa is a small sea snail, a marine gastropod mollusk in the family Mangeliidae.

== Distribution ==
This marine species is found off Mauritius and the Andaman Islands.

== Description ==
The length of the shell attains 7.5 mm.

The color of the shell is white, with a broad brown stain on the back of the body whorl. The ribs are narrow, straight, not on the shoulder. The interstices are closely striated.
