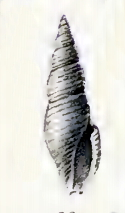
- Original image of a shell of Eucithara edithae

Scientific classification
- Kingdom: Animalia
- Phylum: Mollusca
- Class: Gastropoda
- Subclass: Caenogastropoda
- Order: Neogastropoda
- Superfamily: Conoidea
- Family: Mangeliidae
- Genus: Eucithara
- Species: E. edithae

Binomial name
- Eucithara edithae (Melvill & Standen, 1901)

Synonyms
- Cythara edithae Melvill & Standen, 1901 (original combination)

= Eucithara edithae =

Species of gastropod

Eucithara edithae is a small sea snail, a marine gastropod mollusk in the family Mangeliidae.

== Description ==
The length of the shell attains 10.25 mm, its diameter 3 mm.

The shell has an ovate shape. It is white with brown spots. It contains 8-9 whorls, of which 2-3 in the protoconch. The teleoconch shows a few rectilineal ribs, of which five in the penultimate whorl and six in the body whorl. The aperture is narrow and oblong. The outer lip is incrassate and shows pale brown spots on the dorsal side. The white columella is straight and shows many minute denticles.

== Distribution ==
This marine species occurs in the Gulf of Oman.
