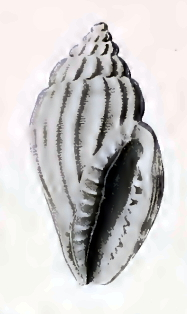
- Original image of Eucithara brocha

Scientific classification
- Kingdom: Animalia
- Phylum: Mollusca
- Class: Gastropoda
- Subclass: Caenogastropoda
- Order: Neogastropoda
- Superfamily: Conoidea
- Family: Mangeliidae
- Genus: Eucithara
- Species: E. brocha

Binomial name
- Eucithara brocha Hedley, 1922

= Eucithara brocha =

Species of gastropod

Eucithara brocha is a small sea snail, a marine gastropod mollusk in the family Mangeliidae.

== Description ==
The length of the shell attains 10 mm, its diameter 4.5 mm.

(Original description) The solid shell has a biconical shape. It contains 6 rounded whorls. Its colour is cinnamon, with several narrow zones of buff. The aperture is pale buff. The interior is ochraceous orange. Sculpture:—The ribs are slender, flexuous, fifteen to a whorl, spaced by more than their breadth, alternating from whorl to whorl, not rising above the suture, but extending thence to the base. The intercostal spaces are crossed by fine engraved striae. Aperture :—The mouth is linear, fortified by a thick broad varix, both sides beset with stout external denticules—ten on the left, nine on the right side.

== Distribution ==
This marine species is endemic to Australia and occurs off (Queensland)
