= Eucithara subterranea =

Scientific classification
- Kingdom: Animalia
- Phylum: Mollusca
- Class: Gastropoda
- Subclass: Caenogastropoda
- Order: Neogastropoda
- Superfamily: Conoidea
- Family: Mangeliidae
- Genus: Eucithara
- Species: E. subterranea

Binomial name
- Eucithara subterranea (Röding, P.F., 1798)

Synonyms
- Eucithara effosa (P.F. Röding, 1798); Pterygia effosa Röding, P.F., 1798

Species of gastropod

Eucithara subterranea is a small sea snail, a marine gastropod mollusk in the family Mangeliidae.

== Distribution ==
The locality of the holotype is unknown.
