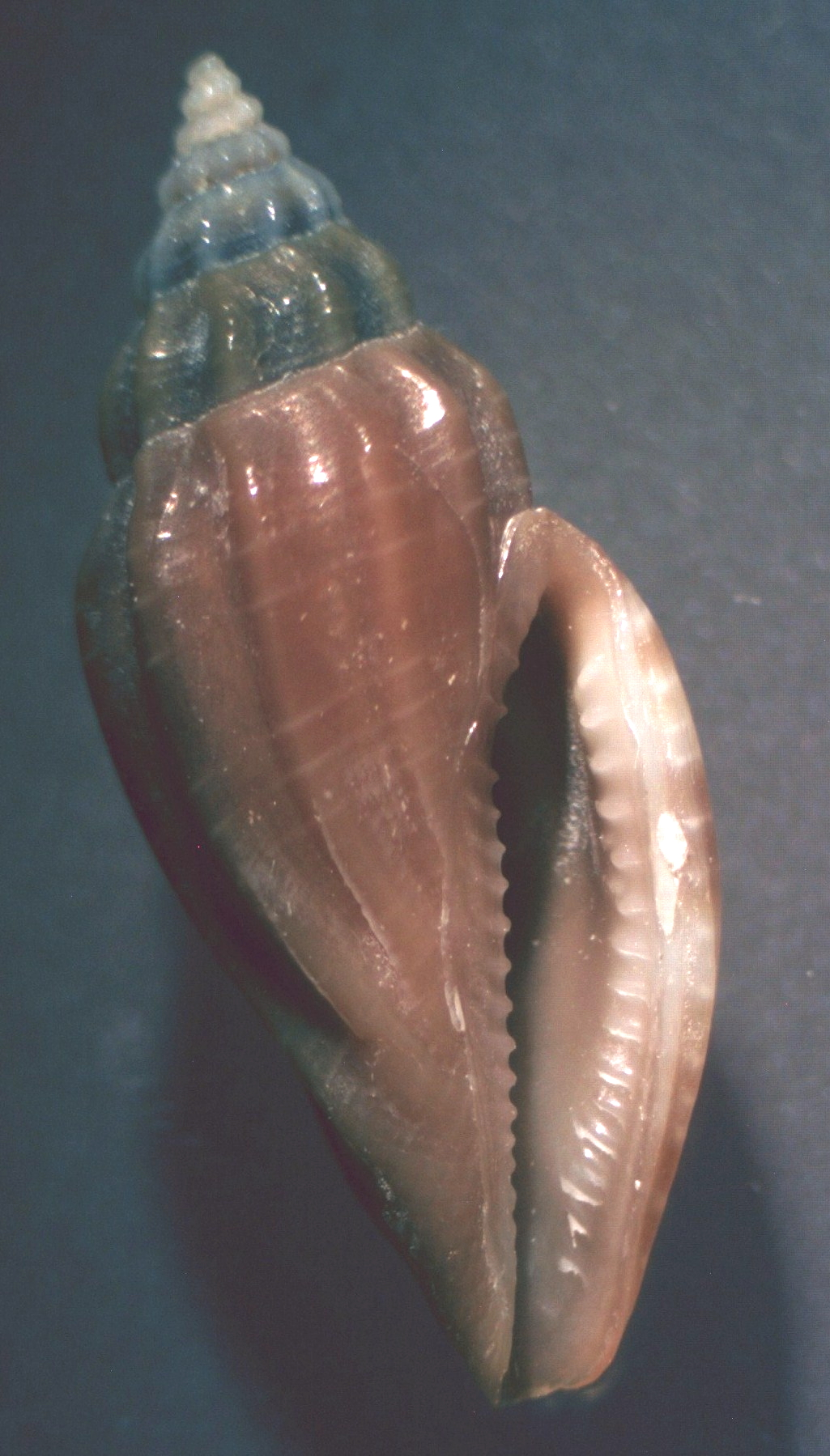
- Apertural view of a shell of Eucithara antillarum

Scientific classification
- Kingdom: Animalia
- Phylum: Mollusca
- Class: Gastropoda
- Subclass: Caenogastropoda
- Order: Neogastropoda
- Superfamily: Conoidea
- Family: Mangeliidae
- Genus: Eucithara
- Species: E. antillarum

Binomial name
- Eucithara antillarum (Reeve, 1846)

Synonyms
- Mangelia antillarum Reeve, 1846 (original combination); Mangilia antillarum Tryon, 1884

= Eucithara antillarum =

Species of gastropod

Eucithara antillarum is a small sea snail, a marine gastropod mollusk in the family Mangeliidae.

== Description ==
The length of the shell attains 16 mm.

The shell is ribbed, without revolving striae. Its color is yellowish brown, broadly banded with chocolate and shoulder tinged with the same color.
