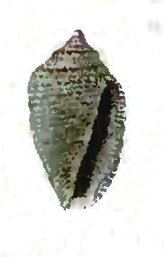
- Original image of a shell of Eucithara souverbiei

Scientific classification
- Kingdom: Animalia
- Phylum: Mollusca
- Class: Gastropoda
- Subclass: Caenogastropoda
- Order: Neogastropoda
- Superfamily: Conoidea
- Family: Mangeliidae
- Genus: Eucithara
- Species: E. souverbiei

Binomial name
- Eucithara souverbiei (Tryon, 1884)

Synonyms
- Cithara souverbiei (Tryon, 1884); Mangilia souverbiei Tryon, 1884 (original combination); Pleurotoma (Cithara) coniformis Souverbie, 1875 (invalid: junior homonym of Pleurotoma coniformis Gray & G. B. Sowerby, 1839; Mangilia souverbiei is a replacement name)

= Eucithara souverbiei =

Species of gastropod

Eucithara souverbiei is a small sea snail, a marine gastropod mollusk in the family Mangeliidae.

== Description ==
The length of the shell attains 7 mm.

The shell is minutely tuberculate at the shoulder-angle, and covered by minute revolving striae. Its color is whitish, with a large dorsal brownish spot or stain. It is also characterized by small, wavy spiral striae that are little protruding.

== Distribution ==
This marine species is endemic to Australia and occurs off Queensland; it was also found off the Loyalty Islands and the Cocos-Keeling Islands.
