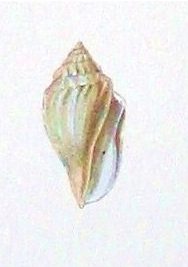
- Drawing of a shell of Eucithara coniformis

Scientific classification
- Kingdom: Animalia
- Phylum: Mollusca
- Class: Gastropoda
- Subclass: Caenogastropoda
- Order: Neogastropoda
- Superfamily: Conoidea
- Family: Mangeliidae
- Genus: Eucithara
- Species: E. coniformis

Binomial name
- Eucithara coniformis (Reeve, 1846)

Synonyms
- Mangelia coniformis Reeve, 1846 (original combination)

= Eucithara coniformis =

Species of gastropod

Eucithara coniformis is a small sea snail, a marine gastropod mollusc in the family Mangeliidae.

== Description ==
The length of the shell attains 9 mm.
