= Eucithara marerosa =

Scientific classification
- Kingdom: Animalia
- Phylum: Mollusca
- Class: Gastropoda
- Subclass: Caenogastropoda
- Order: Neogastropoda
- Superfamily: Conoidea
- Family: Mangeliidae
- Genus: Eucithara
- Species: E. marerosa

Binomial name
- Eucithara marerosa Kilburn 1992

Species of gastropod

Eucithara marerosa is a small sea snail, a marine gastropod mollusk in the family Mangeliidae.

== Description ==
The length of the shell attains 9.9 mm; its diameter 4.1 mm

== Distribution ==
This marine species occurs off Southern KwaZulu-Natal and Eastern Transkei, South Africa
