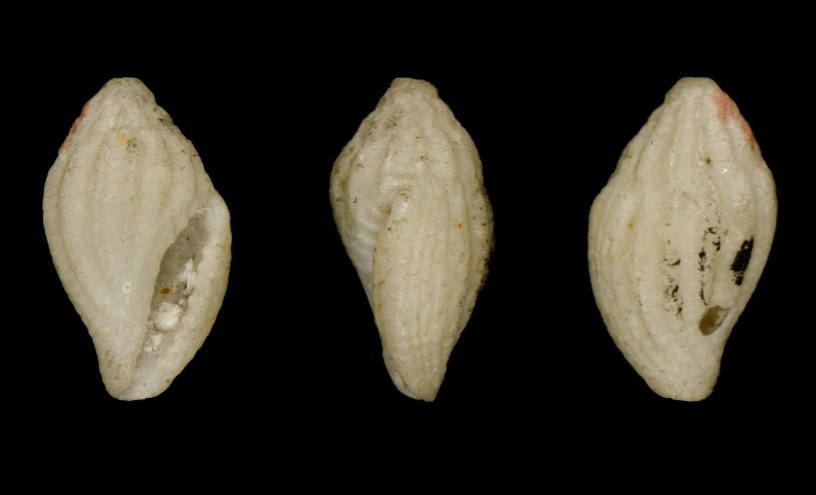
- Shell of Eucithara lota (lectotype at the Smithsonian Institution)

Scientific classification
- Kingdom: Animalia
- Phylum: Mollusca
- Class: Gastropoda
- Subclass: Caenogastropoda
- Order: Neogastropoda
- Superfamily: Conoidea
- Family: Mangeliidae
- Genus: Eucithara
- Species: E. lota

Binomial name
- Eucithara lota (Gould, 1860)

Synonyms
- Cythara lota Gould, 1860 (original combination)

= Eucithara lota =

Species of gastropod

Eucithara lota is a small sea snail, a marine gastropod mollusk in the family Mangeliidae.

The holotype of the species was destroyed in the 1871 Great Chicago Fire.

== Description ==
The length of the shell attains 5 mm, its diameter 3 mm.

(Original description in Latin) The shell is small, ovate-rhomboidal, thick, and white. It is lyrated with up to 12 acute ribs and encircled by deep striae, with the presutural one being larger than the others. Four whorls form an abbreviated spire, and the body whorl slopes forward. The aperture is narrow, exceeding half of the total length. The outer lip is thick, inflected, and toothed internally, and the sinus is deep. The columella is sculptured with up to seven oblique grooves.

== Distribution ==
This marine species occurs off China
