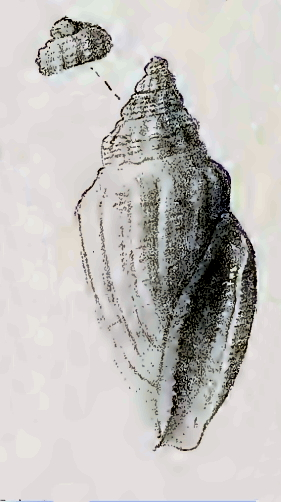
- Original image of a shell and its protoconch of Eucithara duplaris

Scientific classification
- Kingdom: Animalia
- Phylum: Mollusca
- Class: Gastropoda
- Subclass: Caenogastropoda
- Order: Neogastropoda
- Superfamily: Conoidea
- Family: Mangeliidae
- Genus: Eucithara
- Species: E. duplaris

Binomial name
- Eucithara duplaris (Melvill, 1923)

Synonyms
- Cythara duplaris Melvill, 1923 (original combination)

= Eucithara duplaris =

Species of gastropod

Eucithara duplaris is a small sea snail, a marine gastropod mollusk in the family Mangeliidae.

== Distribution ==
This marine species occurs off the Andaman Islands and in the Indian Ocean off the Seychelles to northern Mozambique

== Description ==
The length of the shell attains 16.3 mm, its diameter 6.2 mm.

(Original description) The solid shell is yellowish white. It is longitudinally irregularly but closely ribbed with incrassate ribs. The number of ribs, irregularly set out on the body whorl, is about sixteen. They are numerous likewise on the two next whorls The shell contains 6-7 whorls, at first sloping, then conspicuously and broadly angled. The whole surface is covered with fine revolving striae, which run in pairs, alternating with very narrow intervening spaces. The aperture is narrow and elongate. The outer lip is thickened and shows fifteen small shining white denticulations at the orifice. The columellar margin is extended and similarly denticulate. The wide siphonal canal is very short. The sinus is shallow and obscure.
