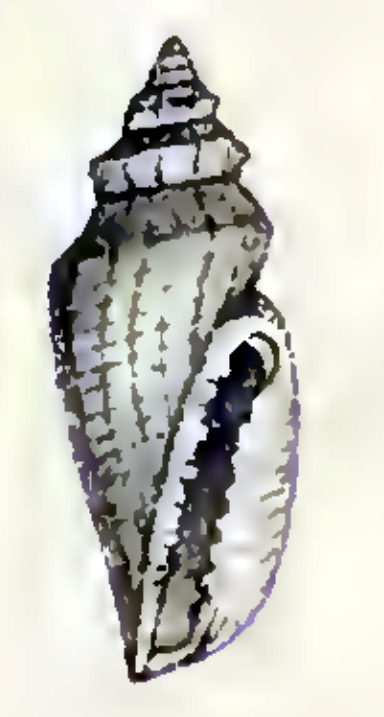
- Original image of a shell of Eucithara crystallina

Scientific classification
- Domain: Eukaryota
- Kingdom: Animalia
- Phylum: Mollusca
- Class: Gastropoda
- Subclass: Caenogastropoda
- Order: Neogastropoda
- Superfamily: Conoidea
- Family: Mangeliidae
- Genus: Eucithara
- Species: E. crystallina

Binomial name
- Eucithara crystallina (Hervier, 1897)

Synonyms
- Cithara crystallina Hervier, 1897 (original combination)

= Eucithara crystallina =

Species of gastropod

Eucithara crystallina is a small sea snail, a marine gastropod mollusk in the family Mangeliidae.

== Description ==
The length of the shell attains 6 mm, its diameter 2.5 mm.

The small shell has an oblong shape with short, briefly conical and acuminate spire. The translucent shell is of a brilliant crystal white, becomes milky white in the thickening of the ribs. It is adorned with longitudinal ribs, numbering 8 to 9 on the penultimate whorl, with interstices 1½ to 2 times wider than their thickness; These blunt ribs are lightly raised, with triangular sections, originate at the suture and run obliquelyto the siphonal canal that they reach by concentrating. The shell is transversely traversed by small well engraved striae, which cut the ribs and their interstices throughout the height. The spire contains 6 to 7 whorls. The 2 embryonic ones are rounded and milky white. The next whorls are clearly by a linear suture. They are slightly rounded and show a start of angulation becoming very sensitive on the middle of the penultimate whorl, which is swollen and knobby. The body whorl exceeds in length 2/3 of the height of the shell. It is briefly and obtusely angular in its upper part, and terminaties n an elongated convex cone. Towards the base of the shell, one observes 4 to 5 high, very oblique ribs surrounding the siphonal canal. The narrow and obliquely elongated aperture exceeds in length half of the total height; The peristome is continuous. The inside of the aperture is hyaline white. The columella is slightly concave and is provided with a large number of small folds disposed throughout its length. The outer lip is arcuate, weakly angular towards the sinus, very thickened on the body whorl. Its lip is sharp, a little prominent at the entrance to the siphonal canal. The interior is furrowed with numerous folds. The sinus is rounded, obliquely entering the thickness of the outer lip, at the point of angulation of the body

== Distribution ==
This marine species occurs off New Caledonia and the Loyalty Islands.
