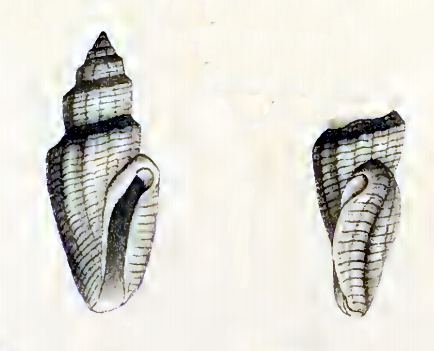
- Original image of a shell of Eucithara isophanes

Scientific classification
- Domain: Eukaryota
- Kingdom: Animalia
- Phylum: Mollusca
- Class: Gastropoda
- Subclass: Caenogastropoda
- Order: Neogastropoda
- Superfamily: Conoidea
- Family: Mangeliidae
- Genus: Eucithara
- Species: E. isophanes

Binomial name
- Eucithara isophanes (Hervier, 1897)

Synonyms
- Mangilia isophanes Hervier, 1897 (original combination)

= Eucithara isophanes =

Species of gastropod

Eucithara isophanes is a small sea snail, a marine gastropod mollusk in the family Mangeliidae.

== Description ==
The length of the shell attains 4.5 mm, its diameter 2 mm.

The small, short shell has an oval shap with a scalar spire. It is distinctly angular in the upper part of the whorls. The shell has a translucent crystal white color. It is adorned with fairly high longitudinal ribs, well rounded, leaving between them an interval equal to twice their thickness. Originating at the suture, they descend obliquely, followed by accentuating the angulation of the whorls and go in describing a very flexuous contour to the siphonal canal where they are concentrated. These chords are surmounted by decurrent, numerous and very thin costae, which, evenly spaced, traverse the whole height of the whorls without being accompanied by intermediate striations.

The shell contains 6 whorls. The two embryonic ones are rounded, smooth and of a white shiny horny color; The whorls of the spire are staggered in a scalarly manner and separated by an undulating linear suture. In their upper part, they are plane, but then slope downward. They then become strongly angulate, below of which they offer a flat to convex profile, and are compressed by the lower suture. The body whorl measures 3/5 of the total height;. After having undergone a more obtuse angle than that of the upper whorls, the body whorl presents (on the opposite side to the outer lip) a more convex profile, weakly depressed below the middle. The aperture is oblique, narrowly oblong, approximately equal to half the total height. The peristome is continuous. The columella is smooth, obliquely directed and weakly concave in its upper part. The outer lip, seen from the front, is angular at the top and presents below the angle an oblique flat to convex profile. The sinus, located between the suture and the angulation, is rounded, obliquely and deeply lodged in the recess of the last rib.

== Distribution ==
This marine species occurs off New Caledonia and the Loyalty Islands
