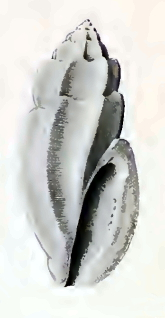
- Shell of Eucithara caledonica

Scientific classification
- Domain: Eukaryota
- Kingdom: Animalia
- Phylum: Mollusca
- Class: Gastropoda
- Subclass: Caenogastropoda
- Order: Neogastropoda
- Superfamily: Conoidea
- Family: Mangeliidae
- Genus: Eucithara
- Species: E. caledonica

Binomial name
- Eucithara caledonica (E. A. Smith, 1882)

Synonyms
- Mangelia zonata var. caledonica Bouge aud Dantzenberg, 1914; Pleurotoma (Mangilia) caledonica E. A. Smith, 1882 (original combination)

= Eucithara caledonica =

Species of gastropod

Eucithara caledonica is a small sea snail, a marine gastropod mollusk in the family Mangeliidae.

== Description ==
The length of the shell attains 6 mm.

The subquadrate-ovate shell has a stout build and contains 8 whorls. It has a pure white colour. It shows fine and even revolving threads, and especially by having only six ribs, including the varix, on the body whorl. The outer lip is incrassate, but the inner part is smooth, and is slightly insinuate at the suture. The siphonal canal is very short and slight recurved.

== Distribution ==
This marine species occurs off New Caledonia, Queensland (Australia).and Taiwan.
