= Eucithara bisacchii =

Scientific classification
- Domain: Eukaryota
- Kingdom: Animalia
- Phylum: Mollusca
- Class: Gastropoda
- Subclass: Caenogastropoda
- Order: Neogastropoda
- Superfamily: Conoidea
- Family: Mangeliidae
- Genus: Eucithara
- Species: E. bisacchii

Binomial name
- Eucithara bisacchii (Hornung & Mermod, 1928)

Synonyms
- Mangilia bisacchii Hornung & Mermod, 1928 (original combination)

Species of gastropod

Eucithara bisacchii is a small sea snail, a marine gastropod mollusk in the family Mangeliidae.

== Description ==
The length of the shell attains 5.5 mm, its diameter 2.4 mm.

The outer lip shows eight distinct denticles. The shell has 11 axial ribs per whorl and on the body whorl, and fine, minute spiral sculpture (about 38 lirae on the penultimate whorl).

== Distribution ==
This marine species occurs in the Red Sea and off Eritrea.
