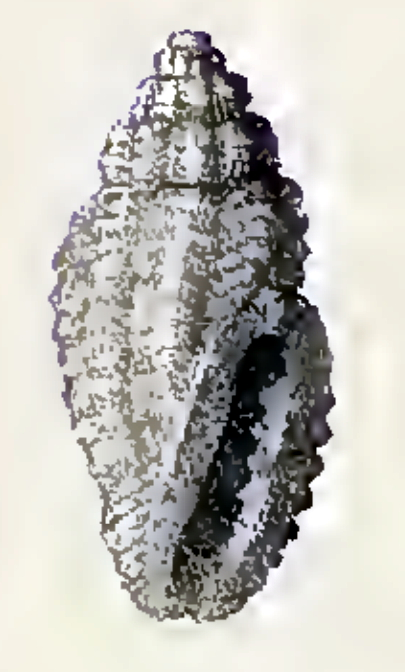
- Original image of a shell of Eucithara bascauda

Scientific classification
- Kingdom: Animalia
- Phylum: Mollusca
- Class: Gastropoda
- Subclass: Caenogastropoda
- Order: Neogastropoda
- Superfamily: Conoidea
- Family: Mangeliidae
- Genus: Eucithara
- Species: E. bascauda

Binomial name
- Eucithara bascauda (Melvill & Standen, 1896)

Synonyms
- Mangelia bascauda J.C. Melvill & R. Standen, 1896; Mangilia bascauda Melvill & Standen, 1896 (original combination)

= Eucithara bascauda =

Species of gastropod

Eucithara bascauda is a small sea snail, a marine gastropod mollusk in the family Mangeliidae.

== Description ==
The length of the shell attains 5.5 mm, its diameter 2.5 mm.

The pale ochraceous shell has an ovate shape with somewhat rounded whorls. The apical whorls are simple and smooth, the rest obliquely thickly costate, with transverse acute lirae. The interstices are extremely minutely decussate. The aperture is oblong. The sinus is small, only half-hollowed out of the outer lip, and not extending across. The lip is much thickened, fimbriolate, within seven or eight denticles. The columella is straight and simple.

== Distribution ==
This marine species occurs off New Caledonia.
