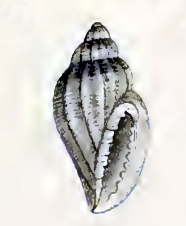
- Original image of a shell of Eucithara lepidella

Scientific classification
- Domain: Eukaryota
- Kingdom: Animalia
- Phylum: Mollusca
- Class: Gastropoda
- Subclass: Caenogastropoda
- Order: Neogastropoda
- Superfamily: Conoidea
- Family: Mangeliidae
- Genus: Eucithara
- Species: E. lepidella

Binomial name
- Eucithara lepidella (Hervier, 1897)

Synonyms
- Cithara lepidella Hervier, 1897 (original combination)

= Eucithara lepidella =

Species of gastropod

Eucithara lepidella is a small sea snail, a marine gastropod mollusk in the family Mangeliidae.

== Description ==
The length of the shell attains 5 mm, its diameter 2.5 mm.

The small shell has an oval shape, very shortly turriculated with very short whorls. The color of the shell is a bright opal white, weakly tinted in the middle of the whorls by a yellow strip, more or less interrupted in the interstices of the costae, and repeated three times on the body whorl. The shell is carved with longitudinal costulae and transverse cords. The ribs are raised (numbering 12 in the penultimate whorl), not very thick, leaving between them an interval equal to their width..Starting on a rather impressed suture, they rise a little above it and, rounding off the angle of the whorl, they descend flexuously towards the siphonal canal where their form concentric arcs. Very faint striae cover the shell with a lattice above the costulae. The spire contains 6 whorls. The 1 1/2 whorls in the protoconch are rounded, smooth, and with glossy milk white color. The next whorls are well separated by a deep suture. They are flat in their upper part, swollen towards the angle, convex below and strongly decayed at the lower suture. The body whorl, which measures 2/3 of the total height, is convex and regularly attenuated to the base. In its dorsal part, the coloring of the strips becomes more and more accentuated and there are even some extra spots near the suture and the siphonal canal. The aperture is oblique, rather narrow, and shows a continuous peristome. The columella is slightly folded. The outer lip is thickened both externally and internally, and is angularly arched at the top and has a sharp edge. Inside it is obscurely furnished with very feeble folds. The sinus, situated obliquely a little below the suture, Is rounded, shallowly notched in the thickness of the outer lip.

== Distribution ==
This marine species occurs off New Caledonia, the Loyalty Islands, the Philippines .
