= Eucithara grata =

Scientific classification
- Kingdom: Animalia
- Phylum: Mollusca
- Class: Gastropoda
- Subclass: Caenogastropoda
- Order: Neogastropoda
- Superfamily: Conoidea
- Family: Mangeliidae
- Genus: Eucithara
- Species: E. grata

Binomial name
- Eucithara grata (E. A. Smith, 1884)

Synonyms
- Pleurotoma (Mangilia) grata E. A. Smith, 1884

Species of gastropod

Eucithara grata is a small sea snail, a marine gastropod mollusk in the family Mangeliidae.

According to Kilburn (1992) this species is very doubtfully referred to the genus Eucithara.

== Description ==
The length of the shell attains 6.7 mm, its diameter 2.8 mm.
