= Eucithara striatella =

Scientific classification
- Domain: Eukaryota
- Kingdom: Animalia
- Phylum: Mollusca
- Class: Gastropoda
- Subclass: Caenogastropoda
- Order: Neogastropoda
- Superfamily: Conoidea
- Family: Mangeliidae
- Genus: Eucithara
- Species: E. striatella

Binomial name
- Eucithara striatella (E. A. Smith, 1884)

Synonyms
- Cithara striatella E. A. Smith, 1884 (original combination); Cythara striatella Melvill, 1917

Species of gastropod

Eucithara striatella is a small sea snail, a marine gastropod mollusk in the family Mangeliidae.

== Description ==
The length of the shell attains 13.8 mm, its diameter 5.1 mm.

The uniform white shell has an oblong-fusiform shape with a narrow base. It contains 7 whorls, of which two smooth conical whorls in the protoconch. The rest are strongly convex with a shallow suture. The 7 axial ribs are high, strong and compressed and are narrower than the intervals, not becoming weak below suture. The ribs are crossed by fine, flattened striae. The inner lip is smooth or with small denticles or weak ridges. The ovate aperture is narrow and measures about half the total length. The columella is straight and shows a few transverse folds. The outer lip is incrassate with 11-12 short plicae. There is massive varix on the body whorl. The wide siphonal canal is short and straight.

== Distribution ==
This marine species occurs from the Persian Gulf to southern Mozambique.
