= Eucithara milia =

Scientific classification
- Kingdom: Animalia
- Phylum: Mollusca
- Class: Gastropoda
- Subclass: Caenogastropoda
- Order: Neogastropoda
- Superfamily: Conoidea
- Family: Mangeliidae
- Genus: Eucithara
- Species: E. milia

Binomial name
- Eucithara milia (R. A. Philippi, 1851)

Synonyms
- Cythara milia (R.A. Philippi, 1851); Mangilia (Cythara) milium R.A. Philippi, 1851 (original combination)

Species of gastropod

Eucithara milia is a small sea snail, a marine gastropod mollusk in the family Mangeliidae.

== Distribution ==
This marine species occurs off China.
