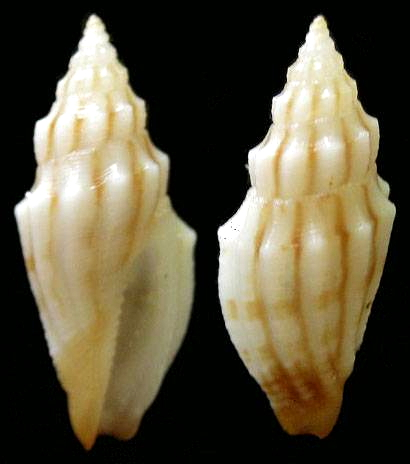
- Shell of Eucithara angela

Scientific classification
- Domain: Eukaryota
- Kingdom: Animalia
- Phylum: Mollusca
- Class: Gastropoda
- Subclass: Caenogastropoda
- Order: Neogastropoda
- Superfamily: Conoidea
- Family: Mangeliidae
- Genus: Eucithara
- Species: E. angela

Binomial name
- Eucithara angela (Adams & Angas, 1864)

Synonyms
- Cithara angela Adams & Angas, 1864 (original combination); Cithara balansai Crosse, 1873; Eucithara balansai J.C.H. Crosse, 1873; Mangilia angela (Adams & Angas, 1864); Mangilia (Cithara) balansai Bonge and Dautzenberg, 1914

= Eucithara angela =

Species of gastropod

Eucithara angela is a small sea snail, a marine gastropod mollusk in the family Mangeliidae.

== Description ==
The length of the ovate-fusiform shell varies between 10 mm and 16 mm.

The color of the shell is yellowish white, chocolate-tinted towards the base. The narrow aperture is stained with violet in front.

== Distribution ==
This marine species occurs off Australia (Queensland) and off Vanuatu.
