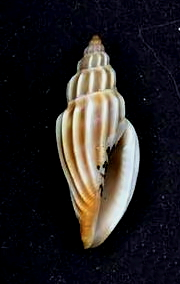
- Shell of Cythara striata

Scientific classification
- Kingdom: Animalia
- Phylum: Mollusca
- Class: Gastropoda
- Subclass: Caenogastropoda
- Order: Neogastropoda
- Superfamily: Conoidea
- Family: Mangeliidae
- Genus: Cythara; Schumacher, 1817

Type species
- Cythara striata Schumacher, 1817

Species
- See text

Synonyms
- Cithara (Incorrect spelling); Daphnella (Cythara) Schumacher, 1817; Mangilia (Cithara); Mangilia (Cythara) Schumacher, 1817; Pleurotoma (Cithara)

= Cythara (gastropod) =

Genus of gastropods

Cythara is a genus of sea snails, marine gastropod mollusks in the family Mangeliidae.

This name is considered a nomen dubium. Hedley (1922: 260) and Powell (1966: 109) summarized the arguments against using the earlier name Cythara Schumacher, 1817, with much uncertainty regarding the identity of its type species, against Eucythara Fischer, 1883. The name has also been used by European authors (e.g. Knudsen, 1952; Nordsieck, 1977) for species classified now in Mangelia Risso, 1826.

== Description ==
The tropical shell is relatively large. It is columbelliform and longitudinally costellated. The spire is short. The aperture is narrow and elongated. The outer lip is denticulated within. The columellar lip is striated.

The margin of the mantle is slightly dilated on the right side.

The shell is fusiform, smooth and longitudinally plicated or ribbed. The aperture is linear, posteriorly subemarginate. The siphonal canal is very short and nearly straight. The columella is subflexuous and transversely striated. The inner lip is posteriorly callous. The outer lip is margined, denticulate, or striated internally.

== Species ==
Species within the genus Cythara include:

- Cythara strigata Pease, 1863 (taxon inquirendum): probably a synonym of Cythara paucicostata Pease, 1867
- † Cythara anthera J. Gardner, 1937
- † Cythara caimitica Maury 1917
- Cythara citharoedus (Holten, H.S., 1802)
- Cythara coniformis (Gray, J.E. & G.B. Sowerby II, 1839)
- Cythara diconus O. Böttger, 1895
- Cythara glareosa Gould, A.A., 1860
- Cythara hanleyi (Dunker, R.W., 1888)
- Cythara milia (Philippi, R.A., 1851)
- Cythara oriza (Hinds, R.B., 1843)
- Cythara paucicostata (Pease, W.H., 1867)
- † Cythara polygona Gabb 1873
- Cythara striata Schumacher, 1817 (nomen dubium)
- Cythara thapsiae Oberling, 1970 (nomen dubium)
- Cythara thetis Turton, W.H., 1932
- Cythara triticea Kiener, L.C., 1840

== Species brought into synonymy ==
- Cythara abyssicola (Reeve, 1846): synonym of Eucithara vittata (Hinds, 1843)
- Cythara adansoni Knudsen, 1952: synonym of Mangelia adansoni (Knudsen, 1952)
- Cythara africana (G. B. Sowerby III, 1903): synonym of Citharomangelia africana (G. B. Sowerby III, 1903)
- Cythara alfredi (E. A. Smith, 1904): synonym of Pseudorhaphitoma alfredi (E. A. Smith, 1904)
- Cythara altenai Brackman, 1938: synonym of Mangelia costulata Risso, 1826
- Cythara amplexa (Gould, 1860): synonym of Guraleus amplexus (Gould, 1860)
- Cythara angiostoma Pease, 1868: synonym of Eucithara angiostoma (Pease, 1868)
- Cythara angulata (Reeve, 1846): synonym of Leiocithara angulata (Reeve, 1846)
- Cythara angulosa E.A. Smith, 1871: synonym of Anacithara angulosa (E.A. Smith, 1871)
- Cythara articulata G.B. Sowerby III, 1894: synonym of Eucithara articulata (G.B. Sowerby III, 1894)
- Cythara atlantidea Knudsen, 1952: synonym of Bela atlantidea (Knudsen, 1952)
- Cythara attenuata (Montagu, 1803): synonym of Mangelia attenuata (Montagu, 1803)
- † Cythara barbadoides Gardner, 1938: synonym of † Mangelia barbadoides J. Gardner, 1938
- Cythara bartlettii (Dall, 1889): synonym of Tenaturris bartlettii (Dall, 1889)
- Cythara bicolor (Reeve, 1846): synonym of Eucithara bicolor (Reeve, 1846)
- Cythara callosa Nordsieck, 1977: synonym of Mangelia callosa (Nordsieck, 1977)
- Cythara capillacea (Reeve, 1846): synonym of Eucithara capillacea (Reeve, 1846)
- Cythara chionea Melvill, J.C. & R. Standen, 1899: synonym of Eucithara coronata (Hinds, 1843)
- Cythara citharella (Lamarck, 1822): synonym of Cythara striata Schumacher, 1817
- Cythara citharella Smith, 1876: synonym of Eucithara lyra (Reeve, 1846)
- Cythara compacta Nordsieck, 1977 (nomen dubium, original combination): synonym of Rissomangelia compacta (Nordsieck, 1977) (nomen dubium)
- Cythara congoensis Thiele, J., 1925: synonym of Mangelia congoensis Thiele, 1925
- Cythara cylindrica (Reeve, 1846): synonym of Gingicithara cylindrica (Reeve, 1846)
- Cythara cylindrica E.A. Smith, 1884: synonym of Gingicithara lyrica (Reeve, 1846)
- Cythara dagama Barnard, 1963: synonym of Gymnobela dagama (Barnard, 1963)
- Cythara dautzenbergi Knudsen, 1952: synonym of Gymnobela dautzenbergi (Knudsen, 1952)
- Cythara debilis Pease, 1868: synonym of Eucithara debilis (Pease, 1868)
- Cythara decussata Pease, 1868: synonym of Eucithara decussata (Pease, 1868)
- Cythara derelicta (Reeve, 1846): synonym of Mangelia unifasciata (Deshayes, 1835)
- Cythara dubiosa Nevill & Nevill, 1875: synonym of Eucithara dubiosa (Nevill & Nevill, 1875)
- Cythara duplaris Melvill, 1923: synonym of Eucithara duplaris (Melvill, 1923)
- Cythara edithae Melvill & Standen, 1901: synonym of Eucithara edithae (Melvill & Standen, 1901)
- Cythara elegantissima Melvill & Standen, 1903: synonym of Paraclathurella gracilenta (Reeve, 1843)
- Cythara farina Nordsieck, 1977: synonym of Mangelia farina (Nordsieck, 1977)
- Cythara fasciata Reeve, L.A., 1846: synonym of Eucithara fasciata (Reeve, 1846)
- Cythara glaucocreas Barnard, 1963: synonym of Gymnobela glaucocreas (Barnard, 1963)
- Cythara gradata Nevill & Nevill, 1875: synonym of Eucithara gradata (Nevill & Nevill, 1875)
- Cythara grisea Nordsieck, 1977: synonym of Mangelia grisea (Nordsieck, 1977)
- Cythara guentheri G.B. Sowerby III, 1893: synonym of Eucithara guentheri (G.B. Sowerby III, 1893)
- Cythara guestieri S.M. Souverbie in S.M. Souverbie & R.P. Montrouzier, 1872: synonym of Eucithara novaehollandiae (Reeve, 1846)
- Cythara ima Bartsch, 1915: synonym of Haedropleura ima (Bartsch, 1915)
- Cythara interstriata Smith E. A., 1876: synonym of Eucithara interstriata (Smith E. A., 1876)
- Cythara isseli Nevill & Nevill, 1875: synonym of Eucithara isseli (Nevill & Nevill, 1875)
- Cythara kingensis (Petterd, 1879): synonym of Antiguraleus kingensis (Petterd, 1879)
- Cythara lota Gould, 1860: synonym of Eucithara lota (Gould, 1860)
- Cythara lyrica (Reeve, 1846): synonym of Gingicithara lyrica (Reeve, 1846)
- Cythara maccoyi Petterd, 1879: synonym of Guraleus tasmanicus (Tenison-Woods, 1876)
- Cythara metadata Brazier, 1876: synonym of Eucithara alacris Hedley, 1922
- Cythara merlini (Dautzenberg, 1910): synonym of Agathotoma merlini (Dautzenberg, 1910)
- Cythara metria Dall, 1903: synonym of Vitricythara metria (Dall, 1903)
- Cythara nevilliana Preston, 1904: synonym of Eucithara nevilliana (Preston, 1904)
- Cythara optabilis G. B. Sowerby III, 1907: synonym of Eucithara coronata (Hinds, 1843)
- Cythara ossea Nordsieck, 1968: synonym of Mangelia ossea (Nordsieck, 1968)
- Cythara paciniana: synonym of Mangelia paciniana (Calcara, 1839)
- Cythara pallaryi Nordsieck, 1977: synonym of Mangiliella pallaryi (Nordsieck, 1977): synonym of Mangelia pallaryi (Nordsieck, 1977)
- Cythara pellucida (Reeve, 1846): synonym of Citharomangelia pellucida (Reeve, 1846)
- Cythara pessulata Brazier, 1876: synonym of Eucithara celebensis (Hinds, 1843)
- Cythara psalterium J.C. Melvill & R. Standen, 1896: synonym of Eucithara coronata (R.B. Hinds, 1843)
- Cythara pusilla Pease, 1860: synonym of Eucithara pusilla (Pease, 1860)
- Cythara quadrilineata G.B. Sowerby III, 1913: synonym of Citharomangelia quadrilineata (G.B. Sowerby III, 1913)
- Cythara ringens G.B. Sowerby III, 1893: synonym of Eucithara ringens (G.B. Sowerby III, 1893)
- Cythara stosiciana (Brusina, 1869): synonym of Mangelia stosiciana Brusina, 1869
- Cythara striatissima G.B. Sowerby III, 1907: synonym of Eucithara striatissima (G.B. Sowerby III, 1907)
- Cythara tasmanica Tenison-Woods, 1876: synonym of Guraleus tasmanicus (Tenison-Woods, 1876)
- Cythara typhonota Melvill & Standen, 1901: synonym of Eucithara typhonota (Melvill & Standen, 1901)
- Cythara unilineata Smith E. A., 1876: synonym of Eucithara unilineata (Smith E. A., 1876)
- Cythara varia Pease, 1860: synonym of Seminella peasei (Martens & Langkavel, 1871)
- Cythara varicosa Nordsieck, 1973: synonym of Mangiliella varicosa (Nordsieck, 1973)
- Cythara vittata (Reeve, 1846): synonym of Eucithara abyssicola (Reeve, 1846)
- Cythara waterhousei E. A. Smith, 1884: synonym of Eucithara coronata (Hinds, 1843)
