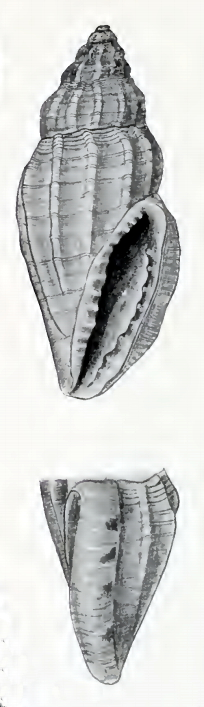
- Original image with two views of a shell of Eucithara hirasei

Scientific classification
- Kingdom: Animalia
- Phylum: Mollusca
- Class: Gastropoda
- Subclass: Caenogastropoda
- Order: Neogastropoda
- Superfamily: Conoidea
- Family: Mangeliidae
- Genus: Eucithara
- Species: E. hirasei

Binomial name
- Eucithara hirasei (Pilsbry, 1904)

Synonyms
- Mangilia (Cythara) hirasei Pilsbry, 1904 (original combination)

= Eucithara hirasei =

Species of gastropod

Eucithara hirasei is a small sea snail, a marine gastropod mollusk in the family Mangeliidae.

== Description ==
The length of the shell varies between 3 mm and 10.4 mm.

(Original description) The shell has an irregularly biconic shap, resembling Eucithara decussata (Pease, 1868). and Eucithara delacouriana (Crosse, 1869) in shape. The shell is thick and solid. Its color is whitish, indistinctly marked with about 4 yellowish spots on the front slope of each rib, and corresponding brown spots on the lip-varix, and with a band composed of 4 to 6 purple-brow lines below the suture. The sculpture shows longitudinal rounded ribs parted by wider concave intervals, and 10 or 11 in number on the body whorl. The last rib is much larger and forms the lip-varix. About 30 spiral threads, on the body whorl, cross the ribs and intervals, sometimes with minor threads between them. The spaces between these threads are evenly granulose by the decussation of growth lines and spiral striae, there being about four spiral series of granides in each interval. The shell contains 7½ whorls. The 2½ whorls in the protoconch are smooth and rounded, the rest subangular in the middle. The body whorl is shouldered above, the shoulder rounded. The aperture is narrow. The outer lip is nearly straight, with about 8 white teeth within. The columella is white, with four or five small entering folds, increased to 8 or 10 at the margin, and with several on the parietal wall.

== Distribution ==
This marine species occurs off Japan and the Philippines .
