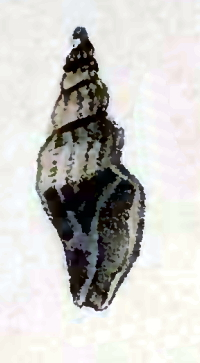
- Image of a shell of Citharomangelia boakei

Scientific classification
- Kingdom: Animalia
- Phylum: Mollusca
- Class: Gastropoda
- Subclass: Caenogastropoda
- Order: Neogastropoda
- Superfamily: Conoidea
- Family: Mangeliidae
- Genus: Citharomangelia
- Species: C. boakei

Binomial name
- Citharomangelia boakei (G. Nevill & H. Nevill, 1869)

Synonyms
- Citharomangelia bicinctula Nevill, G. & H. Nevill, 1871; Mangilia bicinctula Nevill & Nevill, 1871 (synonymised by G.W. Tryon); Marita boakei Trew, 1991; Pleurotoma (Mangelia) boakei Nevill & Nevill, 1869 (original combination)

= Citharomangelia boakei =

Species of gastropod

Citharomangelia boakei is a species of sea snail, a marine gastropod mollusk in the family Mangeliidae.

== Description ==
The length of the shell attains 12 mm.

The shell closely resembles Citharomangelia africana (G. B. Sowerby III, 1903), but it is smaller and with more evenly convex whorls. Furthermore, the 11 – 12 axial ribs are not arcuate below the suture. The spire is higher than in Citharomangelia richardi (Crosse, 1869). The fine spiral striae are distinct. The columella shows traces of transverse plicae. The outer lip is denticulate with 13 denticles.

The whorls are narrowly round-shouldered at the top. The longitudinal plicae are close, small, rather straight. There are no revolving striae. The color is pinkish white, shining, with a subsutural interrupted chestnut band, and another about the top of the aperture. The lower half of the body whorl is pale chestnut. The interior is two-banded with chestnut. The outer lip is thickened, internally minutely crenulated.

== Distribution ==
This marine species occurs off Sri Lanka.
