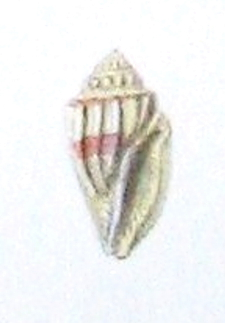
- Shell of Eucithara funebris

Scientific classification
- Kingdom: Animalia
- Phylum: Mollusca
- Class: Gastropoda
- Subclass: Caenogastropoda
- Order: Neogastropoda
- Superfamily: Conoidea
- Family: Mangeliidae
- Genus: Eucithara
- Species: E. gibbosa

Binomial name
- Eucithara gibbosa (Reeve, 1846)

Synonyms
- Cithara gibbosa (Reeve, 1846); Mangelia gibbosa Reeve, 1846 (original combination)

= Eucithara gibbosa =

Species of gastropod

Eucithara gibbosa is a small sea snail, a marine gastropod mollusk in the family Mangeliidae.

Not to be confused with Eucithara gibbosa Hedley, 1922 (, which is a synonym of Eucithara novaehollandiae (Reeve, 1846)

== Description ==
The length of the shell attains 8 mm, its diameter 4.5 mm.

The smooth whorls are nodulous at the shoulder. The ribs are slightly flexuous. The color of the shell is ashy white, encircled by faint orange-brown lines, the back stained with pale black at the upper part.

== Distribution ==
This marine species occurs off the Philippines and off Australia (Queensland, Western Australia).
