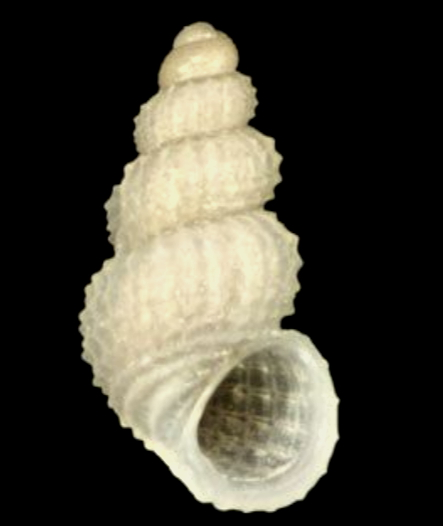
- Shell of Alvania tomentosa (specimen at the Natural History Museum, Rotterdam)

Scientific classification
- Kingdom: Animalia
- Phylum: Mollusca
- Class: Gastropoda
- Subclass: Caenogastropoda
- Order: Littorinimorpha
- Superfamily: Rissooidea
- Family: Rissoidae
- Genus: Alvania
- Species: A. tomentosa

Binomial name
- Alvania tomentosa (Pallary, 1920)

Synonyms
- Alvania altenai van Aartsen, Menkhorst & Gittenberger, 1984; Rissoa tomentosa Pallary, 1920

= Alvania tomentosa =

Species of gastropod

Alvania tomentosa is a species of small sea snail, a marine gastropod mollusk or micromollusk in the family Rissoidae.

== Description ==
The length of the shell varies between 1.5 mm and 3 mm.

== Distribution ==
This species occurs in the Mediterranean Sea off Italy; in the Strait of Gibraltar (Moroccan part).
