= Citharomangelia galigensis =

Scientific classification
- Kingdom: Animalia
- Phylum: Mollusca
- Class: Gastropoda
- Subclass: Caenogastropoda
- Order: Neogastropoda
- Superfamily: Conoidea
- Family: Mangeliidae
- Genus: Citharomangelia
- Species: C. galigensis

Binomial name
- Citharomangelia galigensis (Melvill, 1899)

Synonyms
- Mangilia galigensis Melvill, 1899 (original combination)

Species of gastropod

Citharomangelia galigensis is a species of sea snail, a marine gastropod mollusk in the family Mangeliidae.

== Description ==
The length of the shell attains 14 mm, its diameter 4 mm.

The shell is similar to Citharomangelia africana (G. B. Sowerby III, 1903) but the penultimate whorl only contains 7 axial ribs. The spiral sculpture is even more ill-defined.

== Distribution ==
This marine species occurs in the Persian Gulf off Galig Island.
