= Daphnella pessulata =

- Original image of a shell of Daphnella pessulata

Scientific classification
- Kingdom: Animalia
- Phylum: Mollusca
- Class: Gastropoda
- Subclass: Caenogastropoda
- Order: Neogastropoda
- Superfamily: Conoidea
- Family: Raphitomidae
- Genus: Daphnella
- Species: D. pessulata

Binomial name
- Daphnella pessulata (Reeve, 1843)

Synonyms
- Pleurotoma pessulata Reeve, 1843

Species of gastropod

Daphnella pessulata, common name the barred pleurotoma, is a species of sea snail, a marine gastropod mollusk in the family Raphitomidae.

J.K.Tucker considers this species as a synonym of Gingicithara pessulata, family Mangeliidae.

== Description ==
(Original description) The yellow or ash-coloured shell is rather sharply fusiform. The whorls are slightly convex, longitudinally ribbed. The ribs are rather distant, crossed with somewhat obsolete transverse striae. Although the ribs in this species are comparatively distant from each other, they vary considerably in this respect in different individuals: the more elongated the shell, the closer the ribs. The outer lip is thin. The sinus is small. The siphonal canal is rather short, a little recurved.

== Distribution ==
This marine species occurs off the Philippines.
