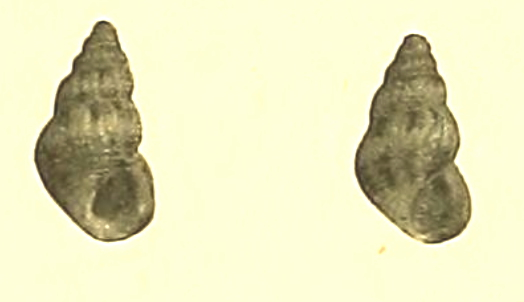
- Shell of Alvania imperspicua (holotype)

Scientific classification
- Kingdom: Animalia
- Phylum: Mollusca
- Class: Gastropoda
- Subclass: Caenogastropoda
- Order: Littorinimorpha
- Superfamily: Rissooidea
- Family: Rissoidae
- Genus: Alvania
- Species: A. imperspicua

Binomial name
- Alvania imperspicua (Pallary, 1920)

Synonyms
- Rissoa (Alvania) imperspicua Pallary, 1920

= Alvania imperspicua =

Species of gastropod

Alvania imperspicua is a species of minute sea snail, a marine gastropod mollusk or micromollusk in the family Rissoidae.

== Distribution ==
This marine species occurs off Casablanca, Morocco.
