= Turbonilla mirifica =

Scientific classification
- Kingdom: Animalia
- Phylum: Mollusca
- Class: Gastropoda
- Family: Pyramidellidae
- Genus: Turbonilla
- Species: T. mirifica

Binomial name
- Turbonilla mirifica Pallary, 1904

Synonyms
- Turbonilla acuticostata Jeffreys, J.G., 1873; Turbonilla (Chemnitzia) mirifica Pallary, 1904

Species of gastropod

Turbonilla mirifica is a species of sea snail, a marine gastropod mollusk in the family Pyramidellidae, the pyrams and their allies.

== Description ==
The length of the shell varies between 3.1 mm and 4.8 mm.

== Distribution ==
This species occurs in the following locations:

- European waters from NW France to Morocco
- Mediterranean Sea (Sicily)
