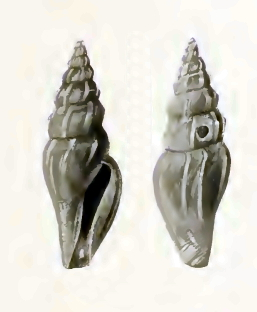
- Shell of Cytharopsis butonensis

Scientific classification
- Kingdom: Animalia
- Phylum: Mollusca
- Class: Gastropoda
- Subclass: Caenogastropoda
- Order: Neogastropoda
- Superfamily: Conoidea
- Family: Mangeliidae
- Genus: Cytharopsis
- Species: C. butonensis

Binomial name
- Cytharopsis butonensis (Schepman, 1913)

Synonyms
- Eucithara butonensis (Schepman, 1913); Mangilia butonensis Schepman, 1913 (original combination)

= Cytharopsis butonensis =

Species of sea snail

Cytharopsis butonensis is a species of sea snail, a marine gastropod mollusk in the family Mangeliidae.

== Taxonomy ==
Shuto (1970) referred the Indonesian Mangilia butonensis Schepman, 1913 which may indeed be an aberrant Leiocithara Hedley, 1922, although its narrow shape could indicate that M.M. Schepman was closer in ascribing it to the genus Mangelia. Kuroda & Oyama (1971) transferred Mangilia butonensis to Cytharopsis

== Description ==
The length of the shell varies between 12 mm and 20 mm.

(Original description) The shell has an elongately fusiform shape, with a high spire and moderately long siphonal canal. It is smooth, shining, pellucid and white. It contains 8 whorl, of which 3½ seem to form a convexly whorled protoconch. Of these the upper 2 are smooth, the rest with crowded axial ribs. The post-nuclear whorls show more remote ribs, 7 or 8 on penultimate whorl, each rib with a small point near its middle, giving an angular appearance to these whorls, though the interstices are nearly regularly rounded. The upper part of the whorls are very faintly crenulate. The base of the body whorl shows very faint spiral striae, more conspicuous on the ribs and a few stronger ones on the siphonal canal. The aperture is oblong, narrow, slightly angular above, below with a rather wide siphonal canal. The peristome is sharp, with a shallow sinus above and a strong rib at some distance behind its margin. The columellar margin is slightly concave above, directed to the left below, with a thin layer of enamel. The interior of the aperture is smooth.

== Distribution ==
This marine species occurs off Sulawesi, Indonesia; in the East China Sea, Taiwan, the Andaman Sea, off Thailand and the Philippines.
