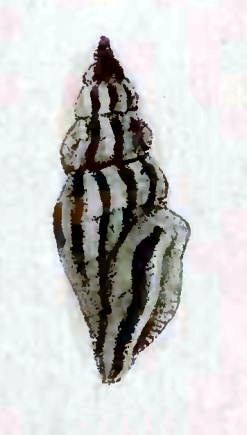
- Drawing of a shell of Citharomangelia planilabroides

Scientific classification
- Kingdom: Animalia
- Phylum: Mollusca
- Class: Gastropoda
- Subclass: Caenogastropoda
- Order: Neogastropoda
- Superfamily: Conoidea
- Family: Mangeliidae
- Genus: Citharomangelia
- Species: C. planilabroides

Binomial name
- Citharomangelia planilabroides (G.W. Tryon, 1884)

Synonyms
- Mangilia planilabroides Tryon, 1884 (original combination)

= Citharomangelia planilabroides =

Species of gastropod

Citharomangelia planilabroides is a species of sea snail, a marine gastropod mollusk in the family Mangeliidae.

== Description ==
The length of the shell attains 20 mm.

The shell is fusiform, smooth, narrowly, slopingly shouldered; brown with a superior white zone.

The species has been renamed by G.W. Tryon as Mangilia planilabroides as it had been already described in 1846 by L.A. Reeve as Mangilia planilabrum, a name already used by him for Mangilia planilabrum described as Pleurotoma planilabrum Reeve, 1843

== Distribution ==
This marine species occurs off the Philippines
