= Cythara anthera =

Scientific classification
- Kingdom: Animalia
- Phylum: Mollusca
- Class: Gastropoda
- Subclass: Caenogastropoda
- Order: Neogastropoda
- Superfamily: Conoidea
- Family: Mangeliidae
- Genus: Cythara
- Species: C. anthera

Binomial name
- Cythara anthera J. Gardner, 1937

Extinct species of gastropod

Cythara anthera is an extinct species of sea snail, a marine gastropod mollusk in the family Mangeliidae.

This species is considered a nomen dubium.

== Distribution ==
This extinct marine species was found in Miocene strata of the Alum Bluff Formation in Florida, United States.
