= Cythara diconus =

Scientific classification
- Kingdom: Animalia
- Phylum: Mollusca
- Class: Gastropoda
- Subclass: Caenogastropoda
- Order: Neogastropoda
- Superfamily: Conoidea
- Family: Mangeliidae
- Genus: Cythara
- Species: C. diconus

Binomial name
- Cythara diconus (O. Böttger, 1895)

Synonyms
- Cithara diconus O. Böttger, 1895

Species of gastropod

Cythara diconus is a species of sea snail, a marine gastropod mollusk in the family Mangeliidae.

This species is considered a nomen dubium.

== Distribution ==
This marine species occurs off the Philippines.
