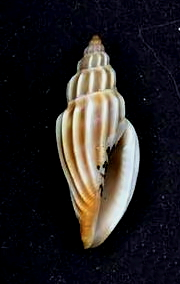
- Shell of Cythara striata (museum specimen at Naturalis Biodiversity Center)

Scientific classification
- Kingdom: Animalia
- Phylum: Mollusca
- Class: Gastropoda
- Subclass: Caenogastropoda
- Order: Neogastropoda
- Superfamily: Conoidea
- Family: Mangeliidae
- Genus: Cythara
- Species: C. striata

Binomial name
- Cythara striata Schumacher, 1817

Synonyms
- Cancellaria citharella Lamarck, 1822; Cythara citharella (Lamarck, 1822); Daphnella (Mangilia) citharella (Lamarck, 1822); Mangilia citharella (Lamarck, 1822)

= Cythara striata =

Species of gastropod

Cythara striata is a species of sea snail, a marine gastropod mollusk in the family Mangeliidae.

This species is considered a nomen dubium.

== Description ==
The length of the shell varies between 15 mm and 20 mm.

The color of the shell is light yellowish brown, or yellowish white, banded narrowly and numerously with chestnut.

== Distribution ==
This marine species occurs off the Philippines, the Moluccas and the Solomon Islands.
