= Cythara paucicostata =

Scientific classification
- Kingdom: Animalia
- Phylum: Mollusca
- Class: Gastropoda
- Subclass: Caenogastropoda
- Order: Neogastropoda
- Superfamily: Conoidea
- Family: Mangeliidae
- Genus: Cythara
- Species: C. paucicostata

Binomial name
- Cythara paucicostata (Pease, W.H., 1867)

Synonyms
- Cithara paucicostata Pease W.H., 1867 (original combination); Mangilia paucicostata Pease, 1867

Species of gastropod

Cythara paucicostata is a species of sea snail, a marine gastropod mollusk in the family Mangeliidae.

This species is considered a nomen dubium.

== Description ==
The length of the shell attains 7 mm, its diameter 3 mm.

(Original description) The wholly white shell has an oblong, ovate shape. The spire is rather short, turreted and acute. The whorls are angulated at the sutures, longitudinally ribbed. There are 7 ribs, very prominent, compressed, running into the sutures. The interstices are concave, finely, regularly and closely striate transversely. The sutures are deep.

== Distribution ==
This marine species occurs off Tahiti and Polynesia.
