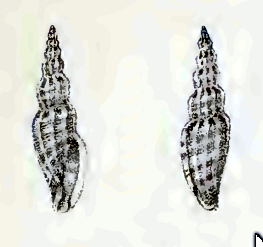
- Original image of a shell of Citharomangelia townsendi

Scientific classification
- Kingdom: Animalia
- Phylum: Mollusca
- Class: Gastropoda
- Subclass: Caenogastropoda
- Order: Neogastropoda
- Superfamily: Conoidea
- Family: Mangeliidae
- Genus: Citharomangelia
- Species: C. townsendi

Binomial name
- Citharomangelia townsendi (G. B. Sowerby III, 1895)

Synonyms
- Mangilia townsendi G. B. Sowerby III, 1895 (original combination)

= Citharomangelia townsendi =

Species of gastropod

Citharomangelia townsendi is a species of sea snail, a marine gastropod mollusk in the family Mangeliidae.

== Description ==
The length of the shell varies attains 13 mm, its diameter 3.8 mm.

(Original description) The elongate-fusiform shell approaches in form the European Mangelia attenuata (Montagu, 1803), but it is larger, the elongate spire proportionately longer, whilst the whorls are slightly shouldered. The transverse striae are very fine, and the longitudinal ribs are regular and rounded. The colour is yellowish white, suffused with greyish green, with transverse lines of light brown, and a dark brown band, interrupted by the ribs, at the angle of the whorls, and another near the base of the body-whorl. The aperture is oblong and very narrow. The outer lip is acute and incrassate.

== Distribution ==
This marine species occurs off Pakistan and West India, India.
