= Cythara thapsiae =

Scientific classification
- Kingdom: Animalia
- Phylum: Mollusca
- Class: Gastropoda
- Subclass: Caenogastropoda
- Order: Neogastropoda
- Superfamily: Conoidea
- Family: Mangeliidae
- Genus: Cythara
- Species: C. thapsiae

Binomial name
- Cythara thapsiae Oberling, 1970

Species of gastropod

Cythara thapsiae is a species of sea snail, a marine gastropod mollusk in the family Mangeliidae.

This species is considered a nomen dubium.

== Distribution ==
This marine species was found off Sicily, Italy.
