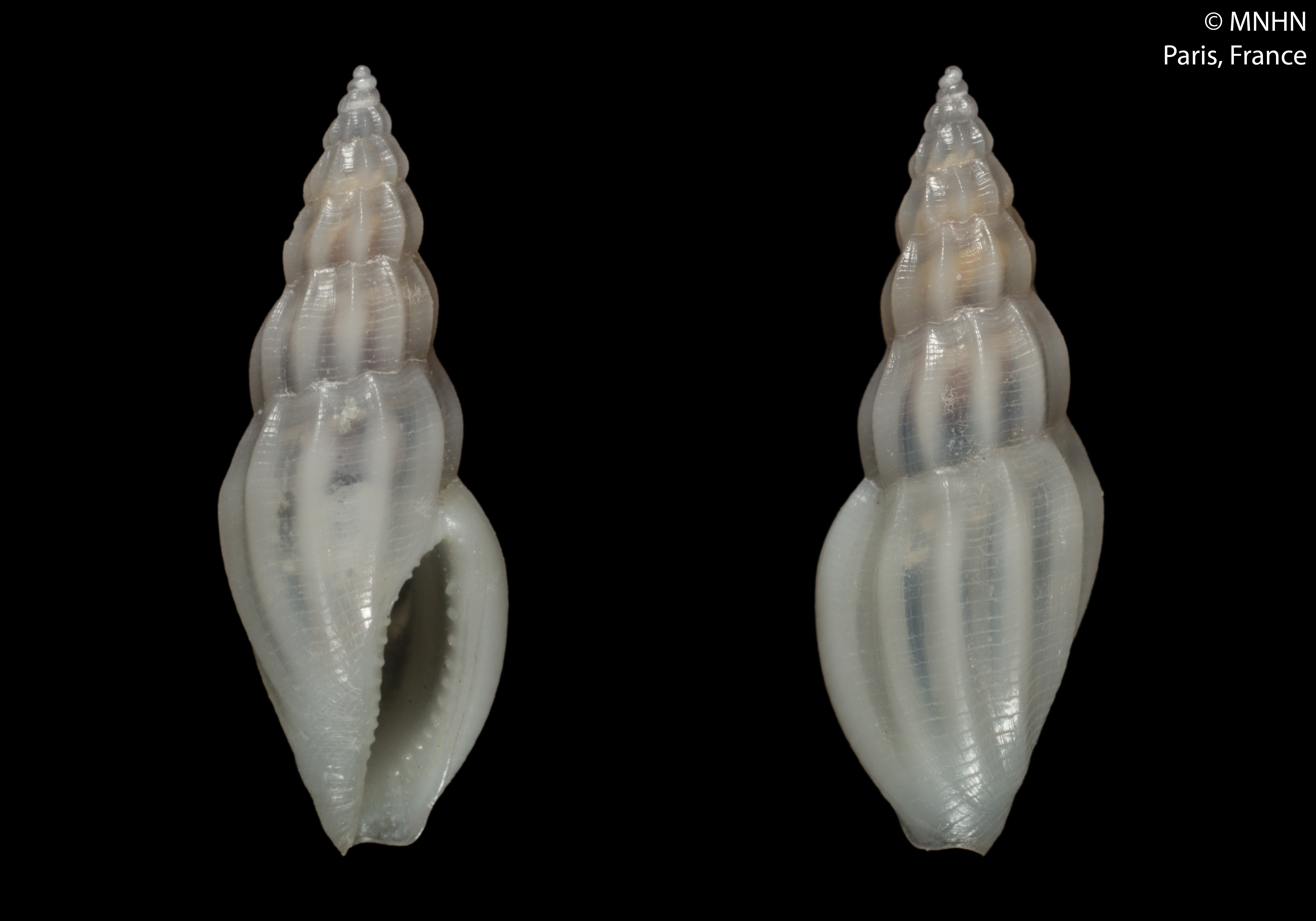
- Shell of Citharomangelia bianca (holotype at MNHN, Paris)

Scientific classification
- Kingdom: Animalia
- Phylum: Mollusca
- Class: Gastropoda
- Subclass: Caenogastropoda
- Order: Neogastropoda
- Superfamily: Conoidea
- Family: Mangeliidae
- Genus: Citharomangelia; Kilburn, 1992

Type species
- Mangilia (Eucythara) africana G. B. Sowerby III, 1903

Species
- See text

= Citharomangelia =

Genus of gastropods

Citharomangelia is a genus of small predatory sea snails, marine gastropod mollusks in the family Mangeliidae.

== Species ==
Species within the genus Citharomangelia include:

- Citharomangelia africana (G. B. Sowerby III, 1903)
- Citharomangelia bianca Bozzetti, 2018
- Citharomangelia bicinctula (Nevill & Nevill, 1871)
- Citharomangelia boakei (Nevill & Nevill, 1869)
- Citharomangelia denticulata (E. A. Smith, 1884)
- Citharomangelia elevata (E. A. Smith, 1884)
- Citharomangelia galigensis (Melvill, 1899)
- Citharomangelia pellucida (Reeve, 1846)
- Citharomangelia planilabroides (Tryon, 1884)
- Citharomangelia quadrilineata (G. B. Sowerby III, 1913)
- Citharomangelia richardi (Crosse, 1869)
- Citharomangelia townsendi (G. B. Sowerby III, 1895)

Species brought into synonymy

- Citharomangelia bicinctula (G. Nevill & H. Nevill, 1871): synonym of Citharomangelia boakei (G. Nevill & H. Nevill, 1869)
