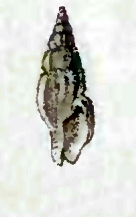
- Drawing of a shell of Cythara oriza

Scientific classification
- Kingdom: Animalia
- Phylum: Mollusca
- Class: Gastropoda
- Subclass: Caenogastropoda
- Order: Neogastropoda
- Superfamily: Conoidea
- Family: Mangeliidae
- Genus: Cythara
- Species: C. oriza

Binomial name
- Cythara oriza (Hinds, 1843)

Synonyms
- Cythara oryza Hinds, 1843 (lapsus); Eucithara oriza (Hinds, 1843); Mangelia oriza Hinds, 1843 (original combination)

= Cythara oriza =

Species of gastropod

Cythara oriza is a species of sea snail, a marine gastropod mollusk in the family Mangeliidae.

This species is considered a nomen dubium.

== Description ==
The whitish, smooth, shining, and acuminate shell contains seven whorls with seven prominent plicate ribs. The length of the shell attains 12 mm.

== Distribution ==
This marine species occurs off the north coast of New Guinea.
