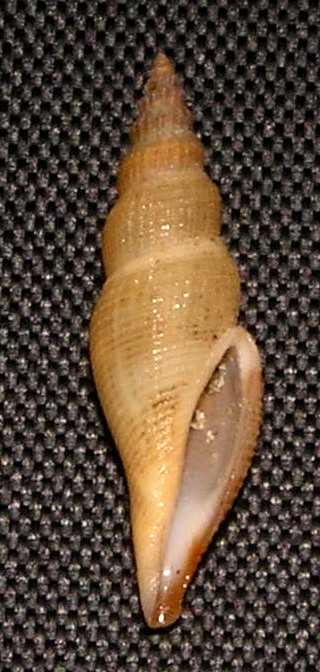
- Cytharopsis cancellata

Scientific classification
- Kingdom: Animalia
- Phylum: Mollusca
- Class: Gastropoda
- Subclass: Caenogastropoda
- Order: Neogastropoda
- Superfamily: Conoidea
- Family: Mangeliidae
- Genus: Cytharopsis; A. Adams, 1865

Type species
- Cytharopsis cancellata A. Adams, 1865

Species
- See text

Synonyms
- Citharopsis A. Adams, 1865

= Cytharopsis =

Genus of gastropods

Cytharopsis is a genus of sea snails, marine gastropod mollusks in the family Mangeliidae.

Not to be confused with Citharopsis Pease, 1868, a synonym of Anarithma Iredale, 1916 (family Mitromorphidae).

== Description ==
The fusiform shell is acuminate. The convex whorls of the spire are cancellated with longitudinal ribs and transverse lirae. The aperture is narrow. The outer lip is varicose. The columella is sillonated. The siphonal canal is curved to the left and elongated.

== Species ==
Species within the genus Cytharopsis include:

- Cytharopsis butonensis (Schepman, 1913)
- Cytharopsis cancellata A. Adams, 1865
- Cytharopsis exquisita (E. A. Smith, 1882)
- Cytharopsis kyushuensis T. Shuto, 1965
- Cytharopsis radulina Kuroda & Oyama, 1971

Species brought into synonymy

- Cytharopsis gracilis Pease, 1868: synonym of Seminella peasei (Martens & Langkavel, 1871)
- Cytharopsis ornata Pease, 1868: synonym of Zafra ornata (Pease, 1868)
- Cytharopsis solida (L.A. Reeve, 1846) : synonym of Eucithara solida (L.A. Reeve, 1846)
