= Gingicithara notabilis =

Scientific classification
- Kingdom: Animalia
- Phylum: Mollusca
- Class: Gastropoda
- Subclass: Caenogastropoda
- Order: Neogastropoda
- Superfamily: Conoidea
- Family: Mangeliidae
- Genus: Gingicithara
- Species: G. notabilis

Binomial name
- Gingicithara notabilis (E. A. Smith, 1888)

Synonyms
- Cythara brunneolineata Preston, H.B., 1905; Eucithara euselma (Melvill & Standen, 1896); Eucithara euselma evanescens (var.) Bouge, J.L. & Ph. Dautzenberg, 1914; Mangilia eudeli Sowerby, G.B. III, 1901; Mangilia (Cythara) brunneolineata Preston, 1905; Mangilia (Cythara) euselma Melvill & Standen, 1896; Mangilia euselrna var. evanescens Bouge & Dautzenberg, 1914; Mangilia quadrasi Boettger, 1895; Pleurotoma notabilis E. A. Smith, 1888; Pleurotorna (Mangilia) notabilis E. A. Smith, 1888 (original combination)

Species of gastropod

Gingicithara notabilis is a species of sea snail, a marine gastropod mollusk in the family Mangeliidae.

== Description ==
The shell of the adult snail varies between 4 mm and 6 mm.

The spiral striations are deep and are placed in pairs. The yellowish bands are not very conspicuous, but on the back of the body whorl one of them at the suture and one in the middle of the outer lip become of a deep brown or chestnut colour.

== Distribution ==
This marine species occurs off South Africa, Madagascar, Réunion, Mauritius, Sri Lanka and New Caledonia
