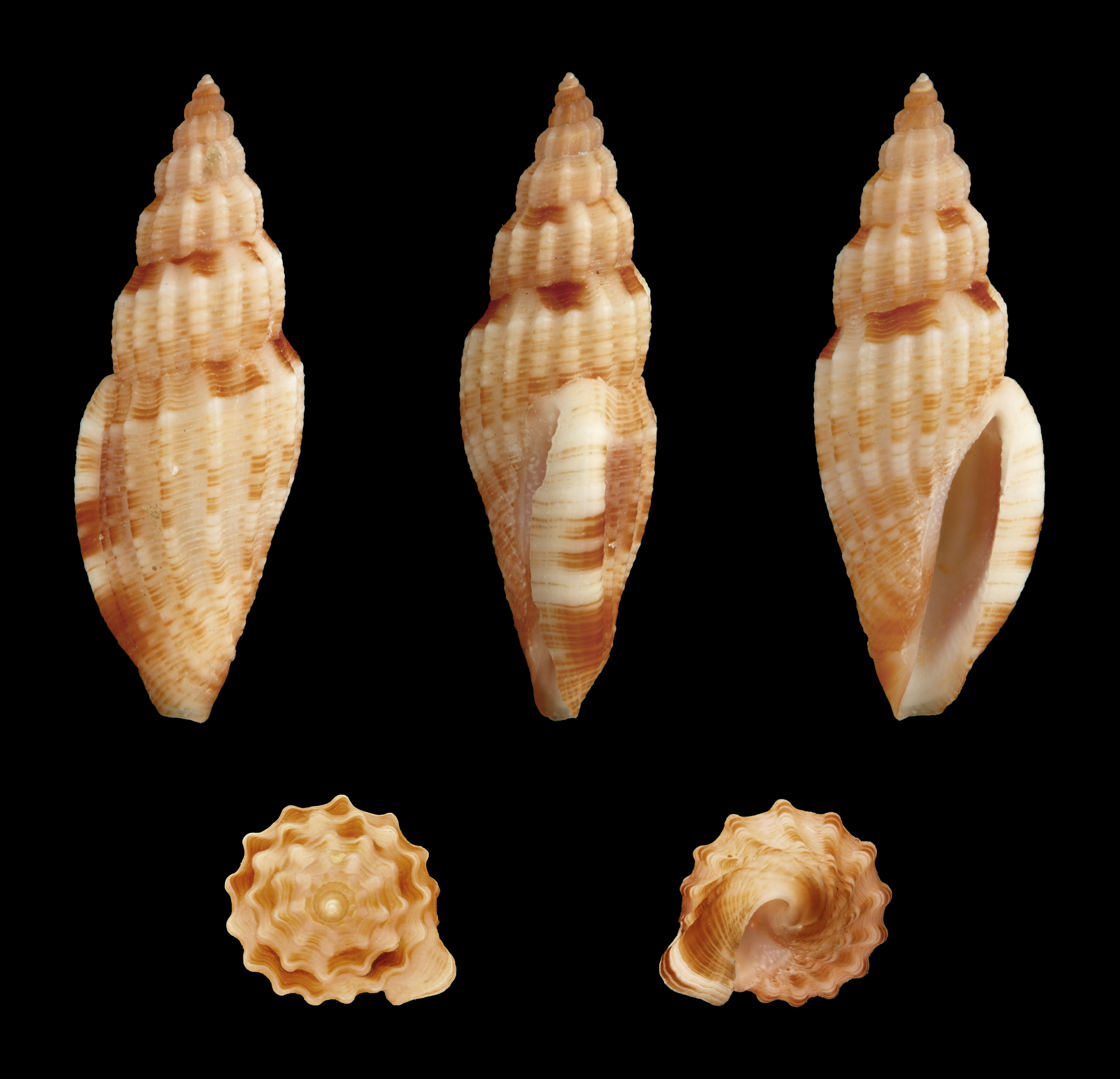
- Gingicithara

Scientific classification
- Kingdom: Animalia
- Phylum: Mollusca
- Class: Gastropoda
- Subclass: Caenogastropoda
- Order: Neogastropoda
- Superfamily: Conoidea
- Family: Mangeliidae
- Genus: Gingicithara; Kilburn, 1992

Type species
- Mangelia lyrica Reeve, 1846

Species
- See text

= Gingicithara =

Genus of gastropods

Gingicithara is a genus of sea snails, marine gastropod mollusks in the family Mangeliidae,

== Species ==
Species within the genus Gingicithara include:

- Gingicithara cylindrica (Reeve, 1846)
- Gingicithara lyrica (Reeve, 1846)
- Gingicithara maraisi Kilburn, 1992
- Gingicithara notabilis (E. A. Smith, 1888)
- Gingicithara pessulata (Reeve, 1846)
- Gingicithara ponderosa (Reeve, 1846)
