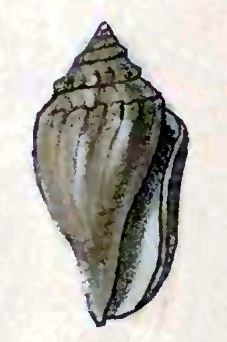
- Shell of Cythara coniformis

Scientific classification
- Kingdom: Animalia
- Phylum: Mollusca
- Class: Gastropoda
- Subclass: Caenogastropoda
- Order: Neogastropoda
- Superfamily: Conoidea
- Family: Mangeliidae
- Genus: Cythara
- Species: C. coniformis

Binomial name
- Cythara coniformis (Gray, J.E. & G.B. Sowerby II, 1839)

Synonyms
- Mangilia coniformis Gray, J.E. & G.B. Sowerby II, 1839

= Cythara coniformis =

Species of gastropod

Cythara coniformis is a species of sea snail, a marine gastropod mollusk in the family Mangeliidae.

This species is considered a nomen dubium.

== Description ==
The length of the shell attains 9 mm.

The thin, whitish shell is rather transparent. It is faintly plicate on the upper part of the whorls and transversely very faintly striated.

== Distribution ==
This marine species occurs off Hawaii, United States.
