= Cythara hanleyi =

Scientific classification
- Kingdom: Animalia
- Phylum: Mollusca
- Class: Gastropoda
- Subclass: Caenogastropoda
- Order: Neogastropoda
- Superfamily: Conoidea
- Family: Mangeliidae
- Genus: Cythara
- Species: C. hanleyi

Binomial name
- Cythara hanleyi (Dunker, R.W., 1888)

Species of gastropod

Cythara hanleyi is a species of sea snail, a marine gastropod mollusk in the family Mangeliidae.

This species is considered a nomen dubium.

== Distribution ==
This marine species occurs off Samoa.
