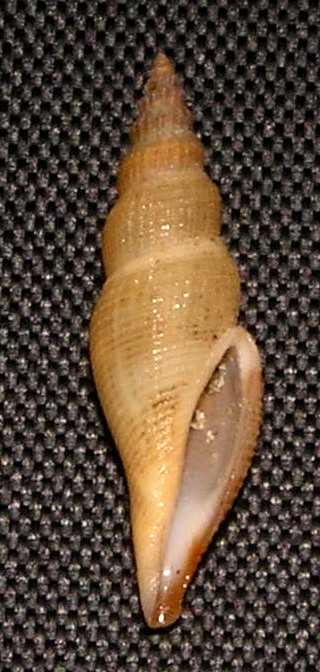
- Apertural view of a shell of Cytharopsis cancellata

Scientific classification
- Kingdom: Animalia
- Phylum: Mollusca
- Class: Gastropoda
- Subclass: Caenogastropoda
- Order: Neogastropoda
- Superfamily: Conoidea
- Family: Mangeliidae
- Genus: Cytharopsis
- Species: C. cancellata

Binomial name
- Cytharopsis cancellata A. Adams, 1865

= Cytharopsis cancellata =

Species of gastropod

Cytharopsis cancellata is a species of sea snail, a marine gastropod mollusk in the family Mangeliidae.

== Description ==
The length of the shell varies between 20 mm and 30 mm.

The shell is acuminated above and below. It is reddish brown. The spire and the aperture are equal in length. The whorls are convex; longitudinally costellate, transversely lirate, closely elegantly cancellate. The body whorl is produced and acuminated below.

== Distribution ==
This marine species occurs off Japan, and the Philippines; in the East China Sea.
