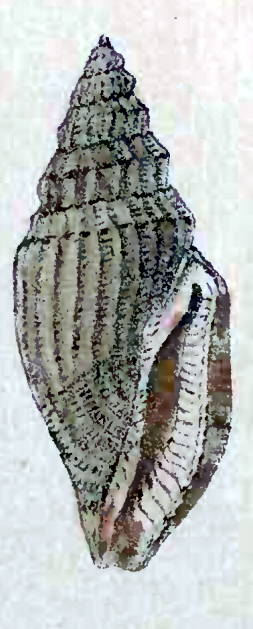
- Drawing of a shell of Gingicithara ponderosa

Scientific classification
- Kingdom: Animalia
- Phylum: Mollusca
- Class: Gastropoda
- Subclass: Caenogastropoda
- Order: Neogastropoda
- Superfamily: Conoidea
- Family: Mangeliidae
- Genus: Gingicithara
- Species: G. ponderosa

Binomial name
- Gingicithara ponderosa (Reeve, 1846)

Synonyms
- Mangelia ponderosa Reeve, 1846 (original combination)

= Gingicithara ponderosa =

Species of gastropod

Gingicithara ponderosa is a species of sea snail, a marine gastropod mollusk in the family Mangeliidae.

== Description ==
The shell of the adult snail varies between 12 mm and 20 mm.

The shell is numerously narrowly and delicately longitudinally ribbed and is latticed by revolving striae. The shell is yellowish white, interruptedly narrowly brown-banded at the slight shoulder, and occasionally tinged with brown elsewhere.

== Distribution ==
This marine species occurs off the Philippines.
