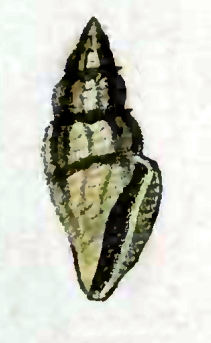
- Shell of Eucithara fasciata

Scientific classification
- Kingdom: Animalia
- Phylum: Mollusca
- Class: Gastropoda
- Subclass: Caenogastropoda
- Order: Neogastropoda
- Superfamily: Conoidea
- Family: Mangeliidae
- Genus: Eucithara
- Species: E. fasciata

Binomial name
- Eucithara fasciata (Reeve, 1846)

Synonyms
- Cythara fasciata (Reeve, 1846) (nomen dubium); Mangilia fasciata Reeve, L.A., 1846 (original description)

= Eucithara fasciata =

Species of gastropod

Eucithara fasciata is a small sea snail, a marine gastropod mollusc in the family Mangeliidae.

R.J. Kilburn (1992) could not find sufficient grounds to distinguish Mangelia fasciata (Gray in Reeve (1846) from Eucithara vittata (Hinds, 1843)

== Description ==
The length of the shell attains 8.5 mm.

The ribs are latticed with conspicuous transverse striae. The shell is yellowish white, with a central, narrow, chestnut band.

== Distribution ==
This marine species occurs off Madagascar and the Andaman and Nicobar Islands .
