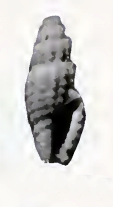
- Original image of a shell of Cythara glareosa

Scientific classification
- Kingdom: Animalia
- Phylum: Mollusca
- Class: Gastropoda
- Subclass: Caenogastropoda
- Order: Neogastropoda
- Superfamily: Conoidea
- Family: Mangeliidae
- Genus: Cythara
- Species: C. glareosa

Binomial name
- Cythara glareosa (Gould, A.A., 1860)

Synonyms
- Eucithara glariosa (A.A. Gould, 1860); Mangelia glariosa Gould, A.A., 1860; Mangilia glariosa Gould, A.A., 1860

= Cythara glareosa =

Species of gastropod

Cythara glareosa is a species of sea snail, a marine gastropod mollusk in the family Mangeliidae.

This species is considered a nomen dubium.

== Description ==
The length of the shell attains 5 mm, its diameter is 2 mm.

== Distribution ==
This marine species occurs off South Africa; in the Indian Ocean; off Hong Kong.
