= Cythara thetis =

Scientific classification
- Kingdom: Animalia
- Phylum: Mollusca
- Class: Gastropoda
- Subclass: Caenogastropoda
- Order: Neogastropoda
- Superfamily: Conoidea
- Family: Mangeliidae
- Genus: Cythara
- Species: C. thetis

Binomial name
- Cythara thetis Turton, 1932

Synonyms
- Marginella thetis Turton, 1932 (considered an invalid name)

Species of gastropod

Cythara thetis is a species of sea snail, a marine gastropod mollusk in the family Mangeliidae.

This species is considered a nomen dubium.

== Distribution ==
This marine species was found off Port Alfred, South Africa.
