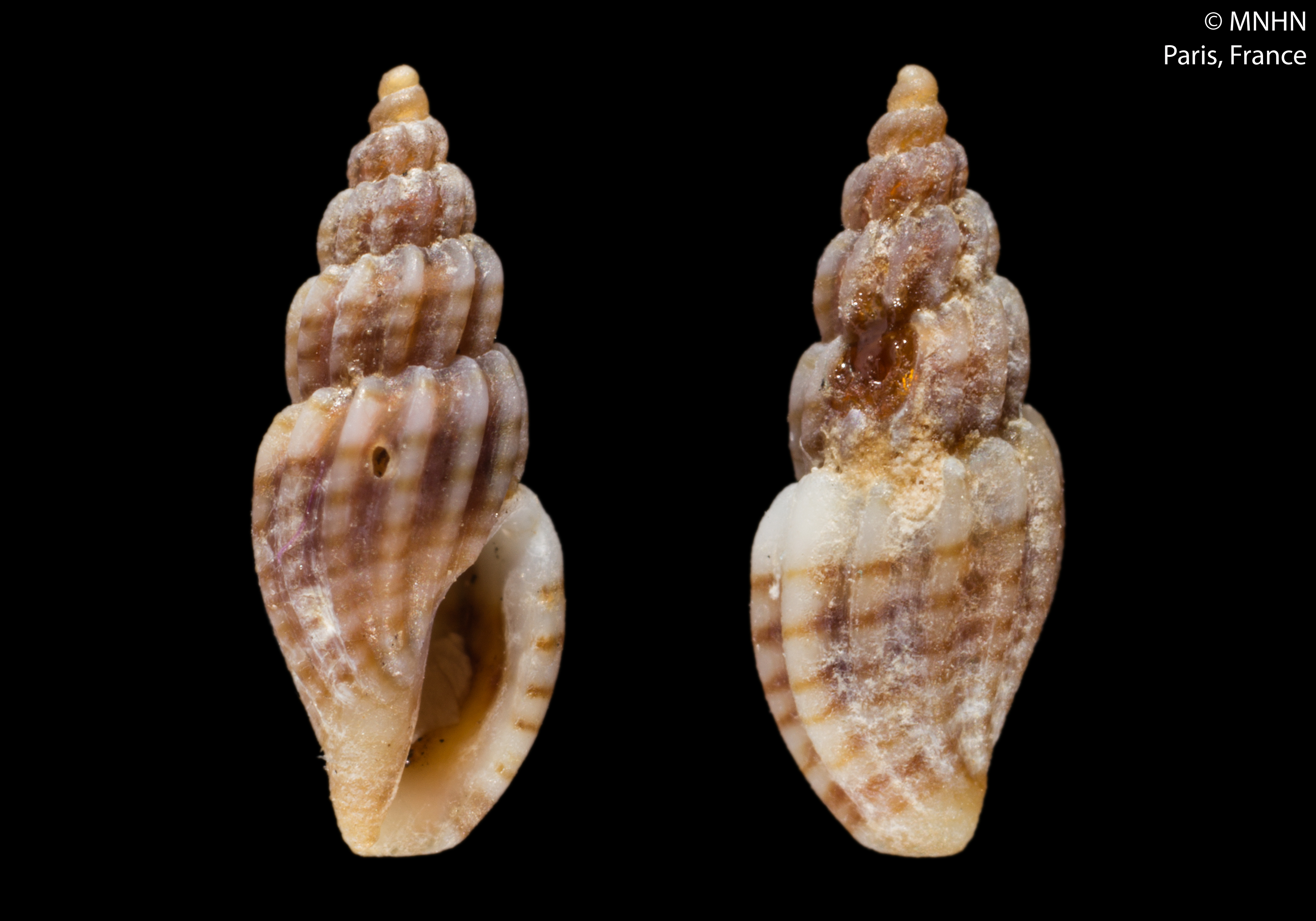
- Shells of Mangelia unifasciata (syntype at MNHN, Paris)

Scientific classification
- Kingdom: Animalia
- Phylum: Mollusca
- Class: Gastropoda
- Subclass: Caenogastropoda
- Order: Neogastropoda
- Superfamily: Conoidea
- Family: Mangeliidae
- Genus: Mangelia
- Species: M. unifasciata

Binomial name
- Mangelia unifasciata (Deshayes, 1835)

Synonyms
- Cyrtocythara aurea Monterosato, T.A. de M. di, 1884; Cythara derelicta (Reeve, 1846); Eucithara unifasciata (G.P. Deshayes, 1834); Mangelia aurea T.A. de M. Monterosato, 1884: Mangelia aurea G.A. Brugnone, 1868; Mangelia aurea F. Nordsieck, 1972: Mangelia atra F. Nordsieck, 1977; Mangelia companyoi Bucquoy, Dautzenberg & Dollfus, 1883; Mangelia derelicta Reeve, 1846; Mangelia difficilis É.A.A. Locard & E. Caziot, 1900; Mangelia goodalliana Leach, 1852; Mangelia goodallii Reeve, 1846; Mangelia rugulosa (Philippi, 1844); Mangelia undulata Risso, 1826 (dubious synonym); Mangelia weinkauffi J.V. Carus, 1893; Mangilia unifasciata (Deshayes, 1835); Pleurotoma albida Deshayes, 1835 (Invalid: junior homonym of Pleurotoma albida Perry, 1811 and P. albida Risso, 1826); Pleurotoma aurea Brugnone, 1868; Pleurotoma galli Bivona Ant. in Bivona And., 1838; Pleurotoma rugulosum Philippi, 1844; Pleurotoma unifasciata Deshayes, 1835 (basionym); Rugocythara goodallii (Reeve, 1846)

= Mangelia unifasciata =

Species of gastropod

Mangelia unifasciata is a species of sea snail, a marine gastropod mollusk in the family Mangeliidae.

Mangelia unifasciata O.G. Costa, 1844 is a synonym of Mangelia vauquelini (B.C.M. Payraudeau, 1826)

== Description ==
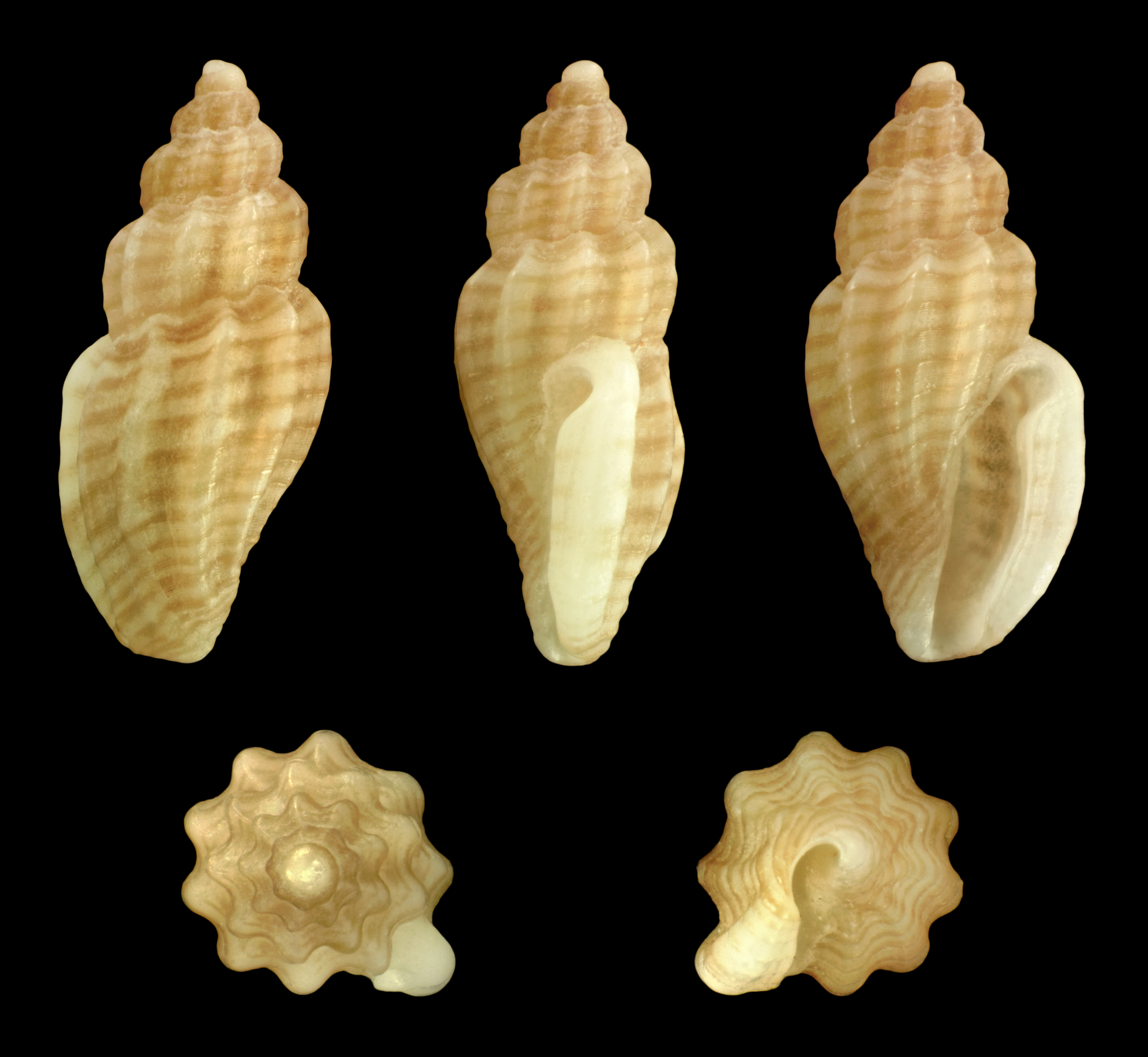
var. galli

The length of the shell varies between 4.5 mm and 7 mm.

The shell is oblong-ovate. The sutures of the spire are rather deep. The shell is longitudinally crossed by bold, sinuous ribs, interstices between the ribs latticed with conspicuous striae. The color of the shell is white, the striae are pale brown.

The white shell has a broad brown band above the aperture, reappearing on the spire, and another one at the base of the body whorl. The aperture is narrow. The outer lip runs almost parallel to the columella.

== Distribution ==
This species occurs in European waters off the British Isles and throughout the Mediterranean Sea, especially off Greece, Italy and France. .
