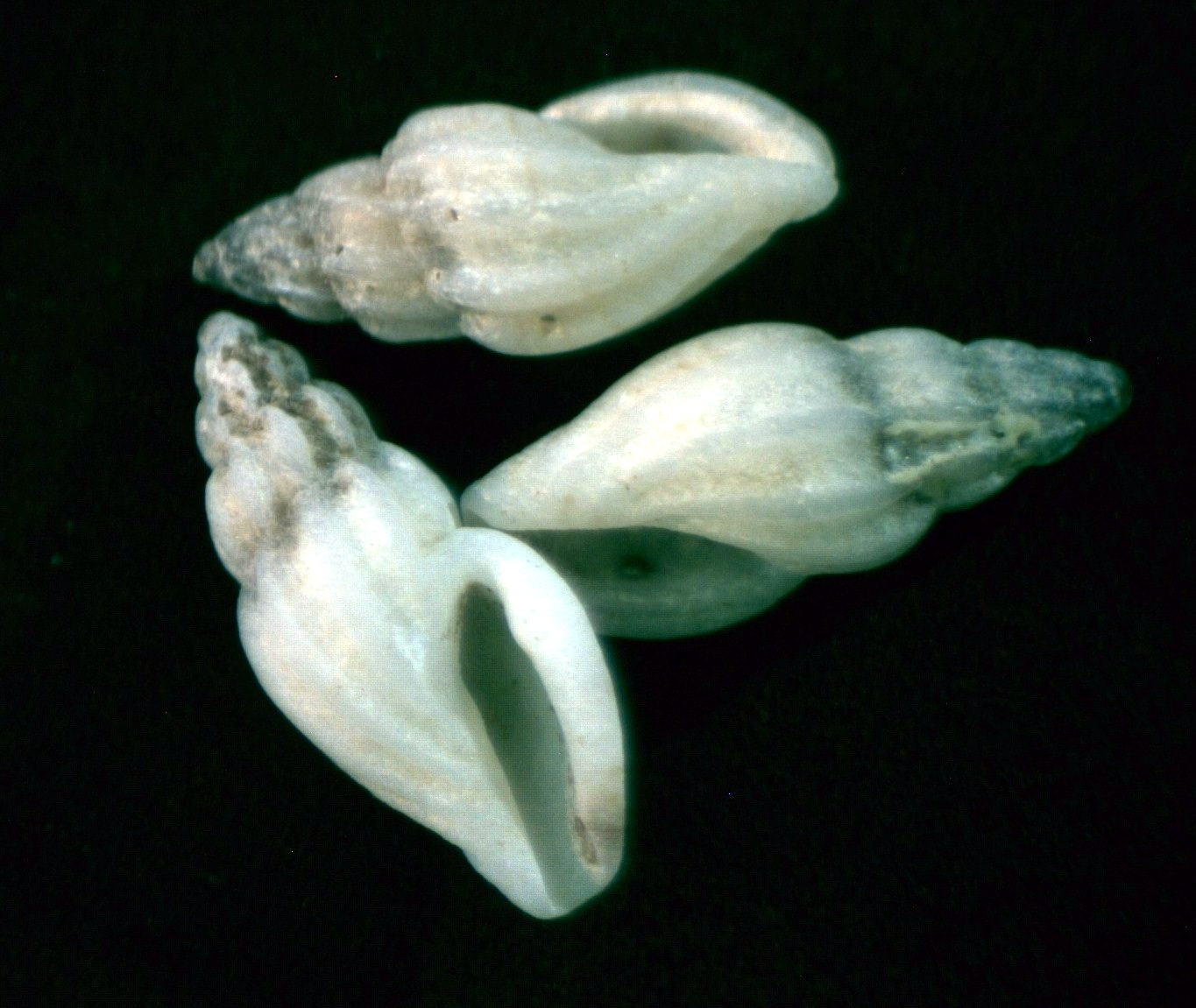
- Shells of Mangelia paciniana

Scientific classification
- Kingdom: Animalia
- Phylum: Mollusca
- Class: Gastropoda
- Subclass: Caenogastropoda
- Order: Neogastropoda
- Superfamily: Conoidea
- Family: Mangeliidae
- Genus: Mangelia
- Species: M. paciniana

Binomial name
- Mangelia paciniana (Calcara, 1839)

Synonyms
- Cythara paciniana; Mangilia pacinii [sic] (misspelling of Mangelia paciniana (Calcara, 1839)); Pleurotoma (Mangelia) paciniana Monterosato, 1878; Pleurotoma paciniana Calcara, 1839; Raphitoma sandrii Brusina, 1865; Raphitoma taeniata Weinkauff, 1868

= Mangelia paciniana =

Species of gastropod

Mangelia paciniana is a species of sea snail, a marine gastropod mollusk in the family Mangeliidae.

== Description ==
The length of the shell attains 6 mm, its diameter 2.75 mm.

The whorls of the oblong, turreted shell are not shouldered, but ribbed as in Mangelia vauquelini, not striate. Its color is yellowish or whitish, with brown revolving lines. The whorls are slightly convex and anteriorly subangular. They are crossed by many longitudinal, pronounced, oblique and undulated ribs. The surface is smooth, even under magnifying lens. The oval aperture is oblong. The siphonal canal is wide and very short. The outer lip has a characteristic tooth, situated at the entrance of the sinus.

== Distribution ==
This species occurs in European waters and in the Mediterranean Sea.
