= Gingicithara maraisi =

Scientific classification
- Kingdom: Animalia
- Phylum: Mollusca
- Class: Gastropoda
- Subclass: Caenogastropoda
- Order: Neogastropoda
- Superfamily: Conoidea
- Family: Mangeliidae
- Genus: Gingicithara
- Species: G. maraisi

Binomial name
- Gingicithara maraisi Kilburn, 1992

Species of gastropod

Gingicithara maraisi is a species of sea snail, a marine gastropod mollusk in the family Mangeliidae.

== Description ==
The shell of the adult snail attains 8.5 mm.

== Distribution ==
This marine species occurs off Durban, South Africa.
