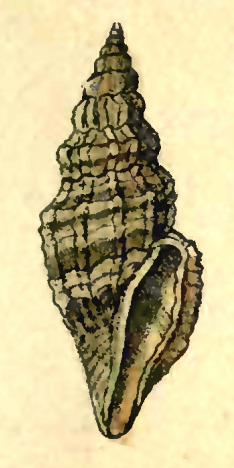
- Shell of Cytharopsis exquisita

Scientific classification
- Kingdom: Animalia
- Phylum: Mollusca
- Class: Gastropoda
- Subclass: Caenogastropoda
- Order: Neogastropoda
- Superfamily: Conoidea
- Family: Mangeliidae
- Genus: Cytharopsis
- Species: C. exquisita

Binomial name
- Cytharopsis exquisita (E. A. Smith, 1882)

Synonyms
- Mangilia exquisita (E.A. Smith, 1882); Pleurotoma (Glyphostoma ?) exquisita E. A. Smith, 1882

= Cytharopsis exquisita =

Species of gastropod

Cytharopsis exquisita is a species of sea snail, a marine gastropod mollusk in the family Mangeliidae.

== Description ==
The length of the shell attains 16 mm.

The shell is narrowly and distantly longitudinally ribbed, transversely very finely corded. It is whitish, lineated and banded with chestnut.

== Distribution ==
This marine species occurs off the Philippines.
