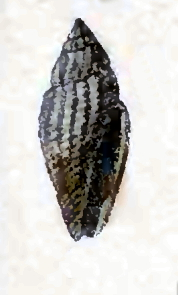
- Drawing of a shell of Cythara triticea

Scientific classification
- Kingdom: Animalia
- Phylum: Mollusca
- Class: Gastropoda
- Subclass: Caenogastropoda
- Order: Neogastropoda
- Superfamily: Conoidea
- Family: Mangeliidae
- Genus: Cythara
- Species: C. triticea

Binomial name
- Cythara triticea (Kiener, L.C., 1840)

Synonyms
- Mangilia triticea (Kiener, L.C., 1840); Pleurotoma triticea Kiener, 1840

= Cythara triticea =

Species of gastropod

Cythara triticea is a species of sea snail, a marine gastropod mollusk in the family Mangeliidae.

This species is considered a nomen dubium.

== Description ==
The length of the shell attains 10 mm.

The longitudinal ribs are oblique. The transverse striae are very fine but distinct. The inner and outer lips are both corrugated. The shell is whitish, with a broad central brown band on the back of the body whorl, which when the shell is worn appears as a spot.

== Distribution ==
This marine species was found in the Indian Ocean.
