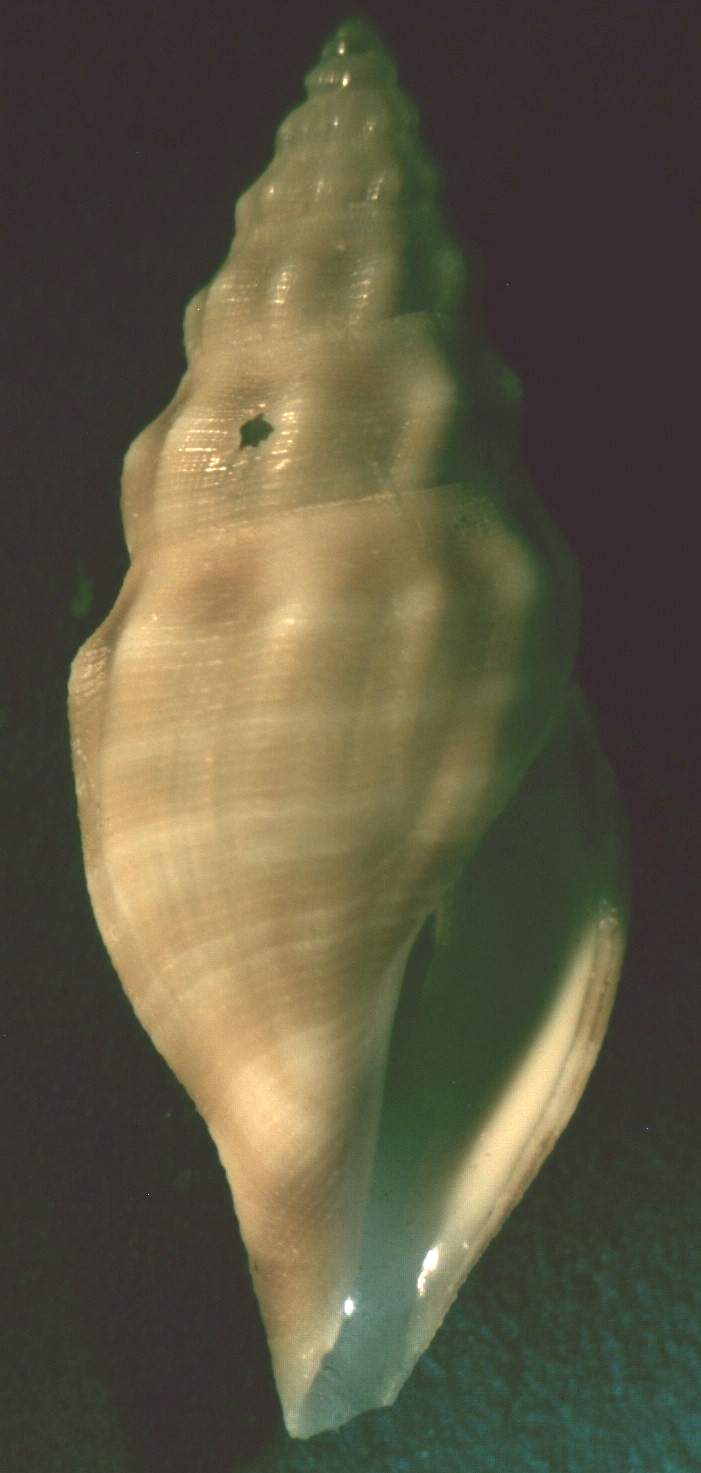
- Apertural view of a shell of Cytharopsis kyushuensis

Scientific classification
- Kingdom: Animalia
- Phylum: Mollusca
- Class: Gastropoda
- Subclass: Caenogastropoda
- Order: Neogastropoda
- Superfamily: Conoidea
- Family: Mangeliidae
- Genus: Cytharopsis
- Species: C. kyushuensis

Binomial name
- Cytharopsis kyushuensis (Shuto, T., 1965)

= Cytharopsis kyushuensis =

Species of gastropod

Cytharopsis kyushuensis is a species of sea snail, a marine gastropod mollusc in the family Mangeliidae.

== Description ==
The length of the shell attains 15 mm.

== Distribution ==
This marine species occurs in the East China Sea; off Japan and the Philippines.
