= Cythara milia =

Scientific classification
- Kingdom: Animalia
- Phylum: Mollusca
- Class: Gastropoda
- Subclass: Caenogastropoda
- Order: Neogastropoda
- Superfamily: Conoidea
- Family: Mangeliidae
- Genus: Cythara
- Species: C. milia

Binomial name
- Cythara milia Philippi, R.A., 1851

Synonyms
- Eucithara milia (R.A. Philippi, 1851)

Species of gastropod

Cythara milia is a species of sea snail, a marine gastropod mollusk in the family Mangeliidae.

This species is considered a nomen dubium.

== Distribution ==
This marine species occurs off China.
