= Citharomangelia elevata =

Scientific classification
- Kingdom: Animalia
- Phylum: Mollusca
- Class: Gastropoda
- Subclass: Caenogastropoda
- Order: Neogastropoda
- Superfamily: Conoidea
- Family: Mangeliidae
- Genus: Citharomangelia
- Species: C. elevata

Binomial name
- Citharomangelia elevata (E. A. Smith, 1884)

Synonyms
- Cithara elevata E. A. Smith, 1884; Cythara elevata Melvill, 1917

Species of gastropod

Citharomangelia elevata is a species of sea snail, a marine gastropod mollusk in the family Mangeliidae.

== Description ==
The length of the shell attains 15 mm, its diameter 4 mm.

The white shell has a fusiform shape with 9 whorls, of which 2–3 in the protoconch. The spire is rather elongate, occupying rather more than half the entire length of the shell. Between the ribs, above the angle, the whorls are faintly stained with a very pale dirty olive tint. It contains 10 straight axial ribs on the penultimate whorl. The aperture is slightly narrow and long. The outer lip is incrassate at the lowest rib and is slightly sinuate at the top. The siphonal canal is short and fairly narrow.

== Distribution ==
This marine species occurs in the Persian Gulf.
