= Cythara caimitica =

Scientific classification
- Kingdom: Animalia
- Phylum: Mollusca
- Class: Gastropoda
- Subclass: Caenogastropoda
- Order: Neogastropoda
- Superfamily: Conoidea
- Family: Mangeliidae
- Genus: Cythara
- Species: C. caimitica

Binomial name
- Cythara caimitica C.J. Maury, 1917

Extinct species of gastropod

Cythara caimitica is an extinct species of sea snail, a marine gastropod mollusk in the family Mangeliidae.

This species is considered a nomen dubium.

== Description ==
The length of the shell varies between 2 mm and 11 mm.

== Distribution ==
This extinct marine species was found in Miocene strata in the Dominican Republic; age range: 11.608 to 5.332 Ma
