= Cytharopsis radulina =

Scientific classification
- Kingdom: Animalia
- Phylum: Mollusca
- Class: Gastropoda
- Subclass: Caenogastropoda
- Order: Neogastropoda
- Superfamily: Conoidea
- Family: Mangeliidae
- Genus: Cytharopsis
- Species: C. radulina

Binomial name
- Cytharopsis radulina Kuroda & Oyama, 1971

Species of gastropod

Cytharopsis radulina is a species of sea snail, a marine gastropod mollusk in the family Mangeliidae.

== Description ==
The length of the shell attains 9.2 mm.

== Distribution ==
This marine species occurs in the East China Sea; off Japan and Fiji.
