= Citharomangelia denticulata =

Scientific classification
- Kingdom: Animalia
- Phylum: Mollusca
- Class: Gastropoda
- Subclass: Caenogastropoda
- Order: Neogastropoda
- Superfamily: Conoidea
- Family: Mangeliidae
- Genus: Citharomangelia
- Species: C. denticulata

Binomial name
- Citharomangelia denticulata (E. A. Smith, 1884)

Synonyms
- Pleurotoma (Mangilia) denticulata E. A. Smith, 1884

Species of gastropod

Citharomangelia denticulata is a species of sea snail, a marine gastropod mollusk in the family Mangeliidae.

== Description ==
The length of the shell attains 9.5 mm, its diameter 2.5 mm.

This is a narrow, elongated species. It contains 9 (?) whorls (the protoconch has been lost). The 6 remaining whorls are convex and a show a faint indication of spiral striation. It contains 12 axial ribs on the penultimate whorl. The aperture is narrow and long. It measures about half of the total length of the shell. The outer lip shows 9 small denticles and is slightly sinuate at the top. The columella has only faint indication of denticles. The siphonal canal is short. The color of the shell is white with brown bands in the sutures.

== Distribution ==
This marine species occurs in the Indian Ocean off Mauritius.
