= Cythara polygona =

Scientific classification
- Kingdom: Animalia
- Phylum: Mollusca
- Class: Gastropoda
- Subclass: Caenogastropoda
- Order: Neogastropoda
- Superfamily: Conoidea
- Family: Mangeliidae
- Genus: Cythara
- Species: C. polygona

Binomial name
- Cythara polygona W.M. Gabb 1873

Extinct species of gastropod

Cythara polygona is an extinct species of sea snail, a marine gastropod mollusk in the family Mangeliidae.

This species is considered a nomen dubium.

== Distribution ==
This extinct marine species was found in Miocene and Pliocene strata in the Dominican Republic; age range: 7.246 to 3.6 Ma
