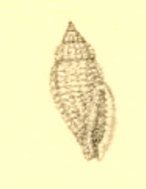
- Original image of a shell of Eucithara articulata

Scientific classification
- Kingdom: Animalia
- Phylum: Mollusca
- Class: Gastropoda
- Subclass: Caenogastropoda
- Order: Neogastropoda
- Superfamily: Conoidea
- Family: Mangeliidae
- Genus: Eucithara
- Species: E. articulata

Binomial name
- Eucithara articulata (G. B. Sowerby III, 1894)

Synonyms
- Cythara articulata G. B. Sowerby III, 1894 (original combination); Daphnella (Cithara) articulata (G. B. Sowerby III, 1894)

= Eucithara articulata =

Species of gastropod

Eucithara articulata is a small sea snail, a marine gastropod mollusk in the family Mangeliidae.

== Description ==
The length of the shell attains 9 mm, its diameter 4 mm.

The shell has a subcylindrical-fusiform shape with an acuminate apex. It contains 7 convex whorls with spiral lirae and longitudinal ribs. The aperture is narrow and elongate. The fine lirae become whitish on crossing the ribs and give to the latter an articulated appearance. The colouring is rather faint and the markings not very clearly defined.

== Distribution ==
This marine species occurs off the Philippines.
