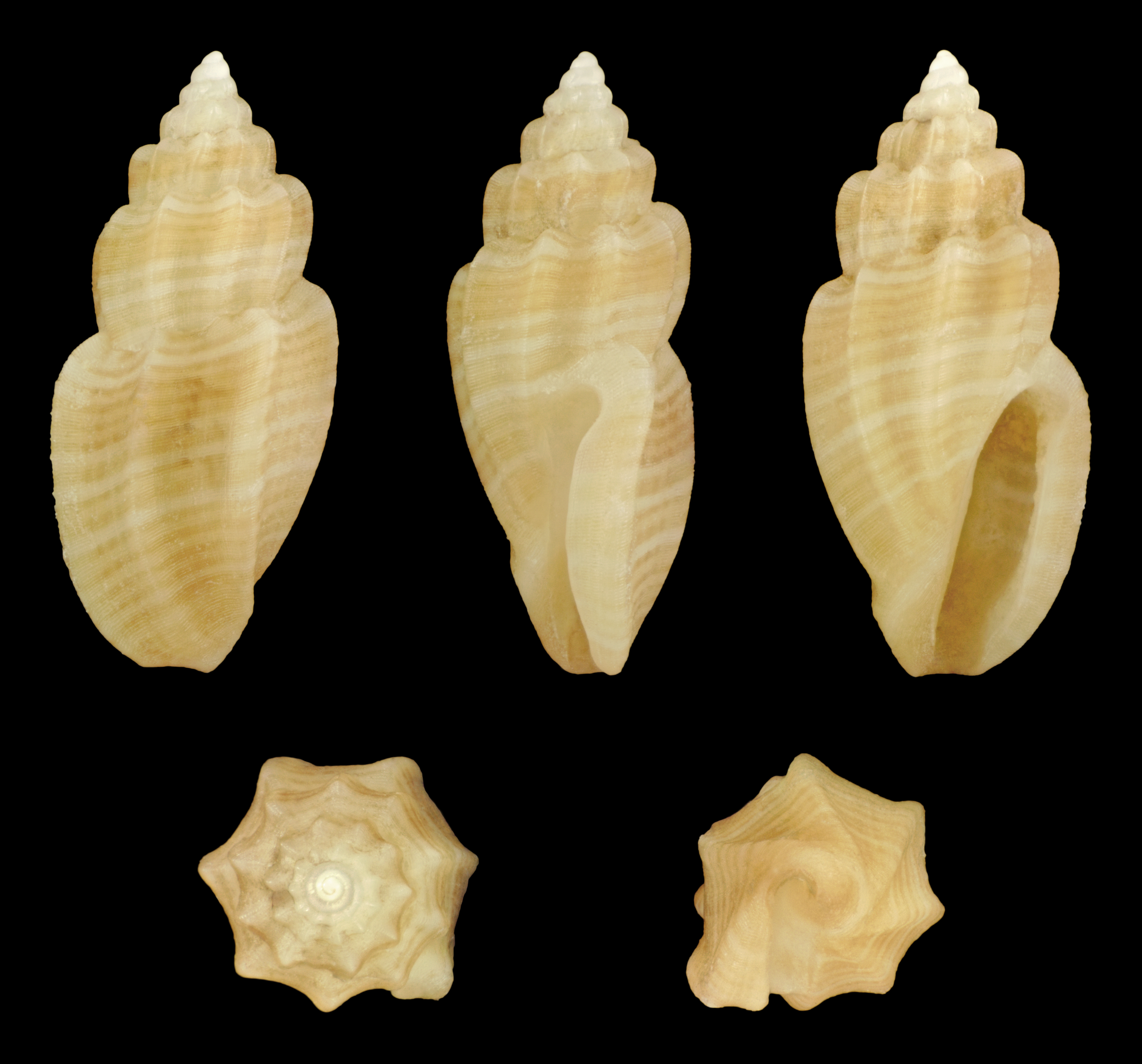
- A shell of Eucithara coronata

Scientific classification
- Kingdom: Animalia
- Phylum: Mollusca
- Class: Gastropoda
- Subclass: Caenogastropoda
- Order: Neogastropoda
- Superfamily: Conoidea
- Family: Mangeliidae
- Genus: Eucithara
- Species: E. coronata

Binomial name
- Eucithara coronata (Hinds, 1843)

Synonyms
- Cithara (Cithara) zonata auct.; Mangelia (Cithara) zonata [partim] auct.; Eucithara capillacea auct.; Mangelia celebensis Hinds, 1843; Mangelia coronata Hinds, 1843 (basionym); Mangelia capillacea Reeve, 1846; Mangelia hornbeckii Reeve, 1846; Mangelia pallida Reeve, 1846; Mangelia zonata Reeve, 1846; Mangelia cithara Gould, 1849; Cythara waterhousei E. A. Smith, 1884; Mangilia (Cythara) psalterium Melvill & Standen, 1896; Cithara subgibbosa Hervier, 1897; Cithara eupoecila Hervier, 1897; Cithara semizonata Hervier, 1897; Cithara subgracilis Hervier, 1898; Mangilia (Cythara) chionea Melvill & Standen, 1899; Cythara chionea Melvill & Standen, 1899; Cythara optabilis Sowerby, 1907; Cythara psalterium J.C. Melvill & R. Standen, 1896; Mangilia (Cithara) zonata var. plurilineata Bouge & Dautzenberg, 1914

= Eucithara coronata =

Species of gastropod

Eucithara coronata is a small sea snail, a marine gastropod mollusk in the family Mangeliidae.

== Distribution ==
This genus is found in the subtidal zone on sandy bottoms between 10 and 30 m in depth. It occurs in Mozambique, the Red Sea to Australia, Polynesia, Hawaii and the Philippines.

== Description ==
The shell size is between 10 and 18 mm. The conical shell has an axial sculpture with six prominent axial ribs that are slightly concave at the shoulder. There are only a few whorls, showing deep sutures, and a large body whorl. The aperture is long and narrow. The color of the shell is creamy white.
