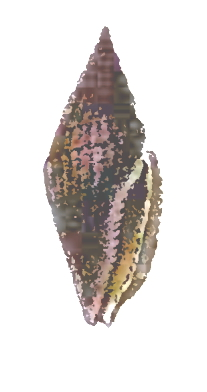
- Shell of Eucithara solida

Scientific classification
- Kingdom: Animalia
- Phylum: Mollusca
- Class: Gastropoda
- Subclass: Caenogastropoda
- Order: Neogastropoda
- Superfamily: Conoidea
- Family: Mangeliidae
- Genus: Eucithara
- Species: E. solida

Binomial name
- Eucithara solida (Reeve, 1846)

Synonyms
- Citharopsis solida (Reeve, 1846); Mangelia solida Reeve, 1846

= Eucithara solida =

Species of gastropod

Eucithara solida is a small sea snail, a marine gastropod mollusk in the family Mangeliidae.

== Description ==
The length of the shell attains 7 mm. The purplish shell is solid. It is very closely granosely latticed throughout.

== Distribution ==
This marine species is found off the Philippines.
