= Mangelia ossea =

Scientific classification
- Kingdom: Animalia
- Phylum: Mollusca
- Class: Gastropoda
- Subclass: Caenogastropoda
- Order: Neogastropoda
- Superfamily: Conoidea
- Family: Mangeliidae
- Genus: Mangelia
- Species: M. ossea

Binomial name
- Mangelia ossea (F. Nordsieck, 1968)

Synonyms
- Cythara ossea F. Nordsieck, 1968; Mangelia (Mangiliella) striolata ossea (F. Nordsieck, 1968)

Species of gastropod

Mangelia ossea is a species of sea snail, a marine gastropod mollusk in the family Mangeliidae.

== Distribution ==
This marine species occurs in the Mediterranean Sea off Cagliari, Italy
