= Mangelia adansoni =

Scientific classification
- Kingdom: Animalia
- Phylum: Mollusca
- Class: Gastropoda
- Subclass: Caenogastropoda
- Order: Neogastropoda
- Superfamily: Conoidea
- Family: Mangeliidae
- Genus: Mangelia
- Species: M. adansoni

Binomial name
- Mangelia adansoni (Knudsen, 1952)

Synonyms
- Cythara adansoni Knudsen, 1952

Species of gastropod

Mangelia adansoni is a species of sea snail, a marine gastropod mollusk in the family Mangeliidae.

== Taxonomy ==
Originally placed in Cythara Schumacher, 1817, an unaccepted generic name; tentatively here placed in Mangelia

== Distribution ==
This marine species occurs off West Africa
