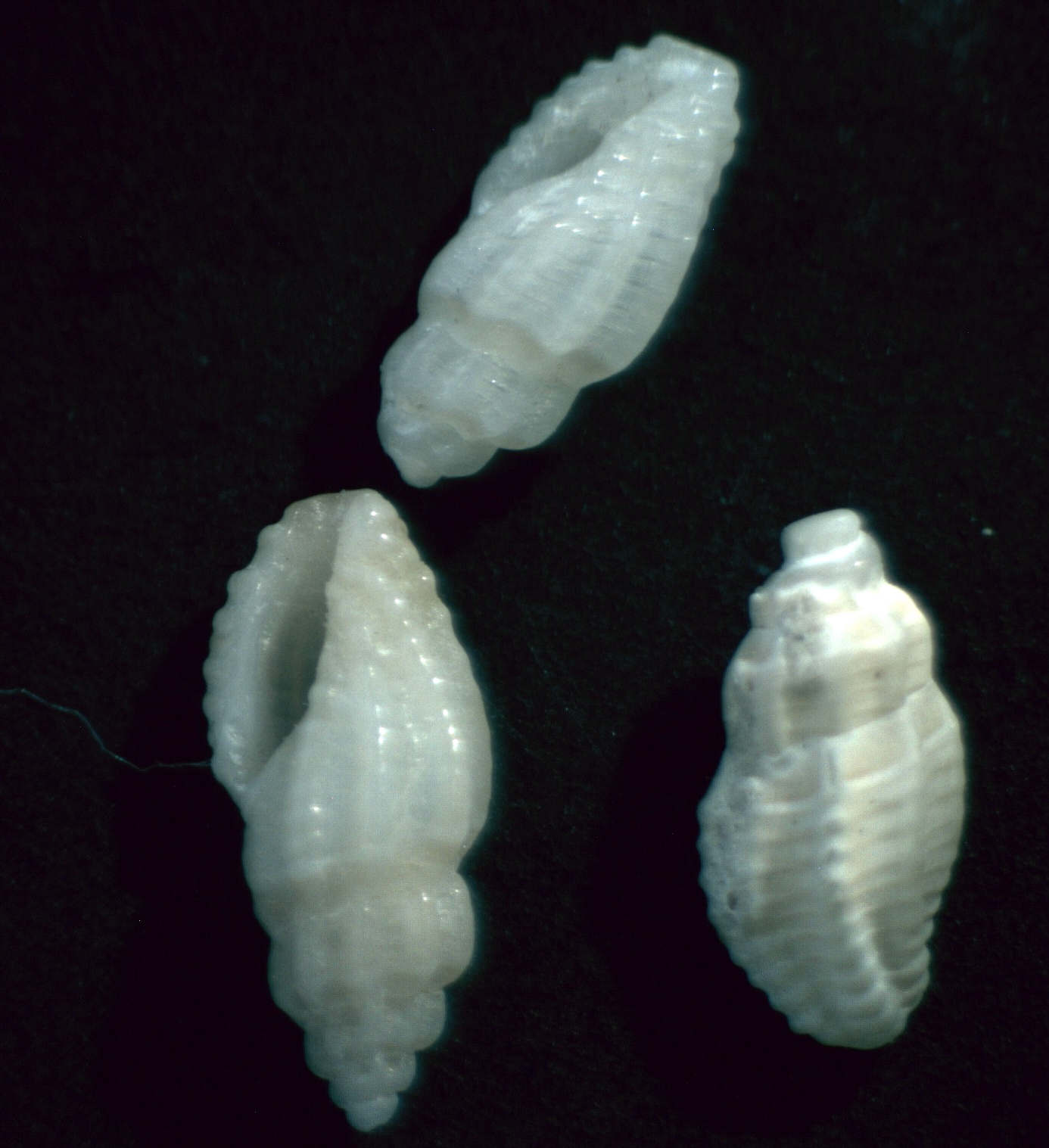
- Shells of Mangelia stosiciana (museum specimens)

Scientific classification
- Kingdom: Animalia
- Phylum: Mollusca
- Class: Gastropoda
- Subclass: Caenogastropoda
- Order: Neogastropoda
- Superfamily: Conoidea
- Family: Mangeliidae
- Genus: Mangelia
- Species: M. stosiciana

Binomial name
- Mangelia stosiciana Brusina, 1869

Synonyms
- Mangelia stossiciana Brusina, 1869 (misspelling); Mangilia crenulata Carus, J.V., 1893 (nomen nudum)

= Mangelia stosiciana =

Species of gastropod

Mangelia stosiciana is a species of sea snail, a marine gastropod mollusk in the family Mangeliidae.

== Description ==
The length of the shell attains 6 mm.

The color of the shell is whitish to yellowish-brown. The whorls are round-shouldered above. The rude ribs show wider interspaces and are crossed by elevated revolving lines, some of them much larger than the rest, and which are sometimes brown.

== Distribution ==
This species occurs in the Mediterranean Sea and off the Canary Islands.
