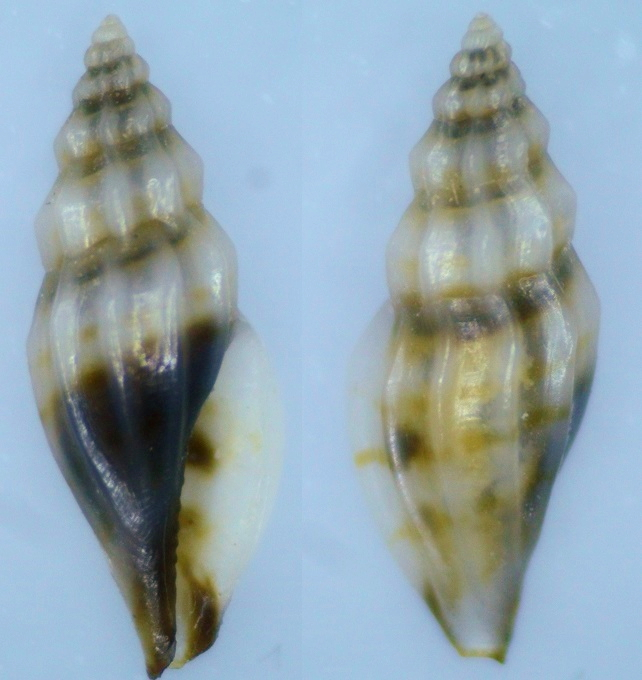
- Two views of a shell of Citharomangelia richardi

Scientific classification
- Kingdom: Animalia
- Phylum: Mollusca
- Class: Gastropoda
- Subclass: Caenogastropoda
- Order: Neogastropoda
- Superfamily: Conoidea
- Family: Mangeliidae
- Genus: Citharomangelia
- Species: C. richardi

Binomial name
- Citharomangelia richardi (Crosse, 1869)

Synonyms
- Cithara richardi Crosse, 1869 (original combination); Mangilia (Cithara) richardi Bouge & Dautzenberg, 1914; Mangilia cinnamomea peraffinis Pilsbry, 1904

= Citharomangelia richardi =

Species of gastropod

Citharomangelia richardi is a species of sea snail, a marine gastropod mollusk in the family Mangeliidae.

== Description ==
The length of the shell varies between 5 mm and 9 mm.

The shell has a biconic-fusiform shape. It shows 7-9 axial ribs on the later whorls. The spiral striae can only be seen under a lens. The outer lip has 9-12 plicae, with the posterior one nodiform.

== Distribution ==
This marine species occurs in the Indo-Pacific off KwaZulu-Natal, South Africa, Mozambique; also off Japan and New Caledonia.
