= Mangelia congoensis =

Scientific classification
- Kingdom: Animalia
- Phylum: Mollusca
- Class: Gastropoda
- Subclass: Caenogastropoda
- Order: Neogastropoda
- Superfamily: Conoidea
- Family: Mangeliidae
- Genus: Mangelia
- Species: M. congoensis

Binomial name
- Mangelia congoensis Thiele, 1925

Synonyms
- Cythara congoensis (Thiele, J., 1925)

Species of sea snail

Mangelia congoensis is a species of sea snail, a marine gastropod mollusk in the family Mangeliidae.

== Distribution ==
This marine species was found at the estuary of the Zaire River, Congo
