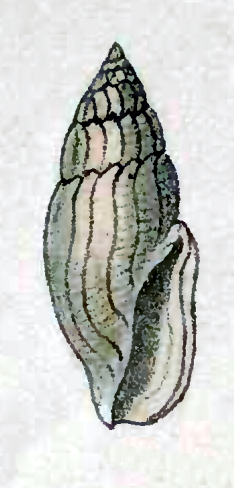
- Drawing of a shell of Gingicithara pessulata

Scientific classification
- Kingdom: Animalia
- Phylum: Mollusca
- Class: Gastropoda
- Subclass: Caenogastropoda
- Order: Neogastropoda
- Superfamily: Conoidea
- Family: Mangeliidae
- Genus: Gingicithara
- Species: G. pessulata

Binomial name
- Gingicithara pessulata (Reeve, 1846)

Synonyms
- Mangelia pessulata Reeve, 1846 (original combination); Rhaphitoma [sic] pessulata; Boettger, 1905

= Gingicithara pessulata =

Species of gastropod

Gingicithara pessulata is a species of sea snail, a marine gastropod mollusk in the family Mangeliidae.

== Description ==
The shell of the adult snail attains 11 mm.

The whorls are not shouldered and rather flat They are rather numerously flexuously longitudinally ribbed. The interstices show revolving striae. The shell is whitish.

== Distribution ==
This marine species occurs off the Philippines.
