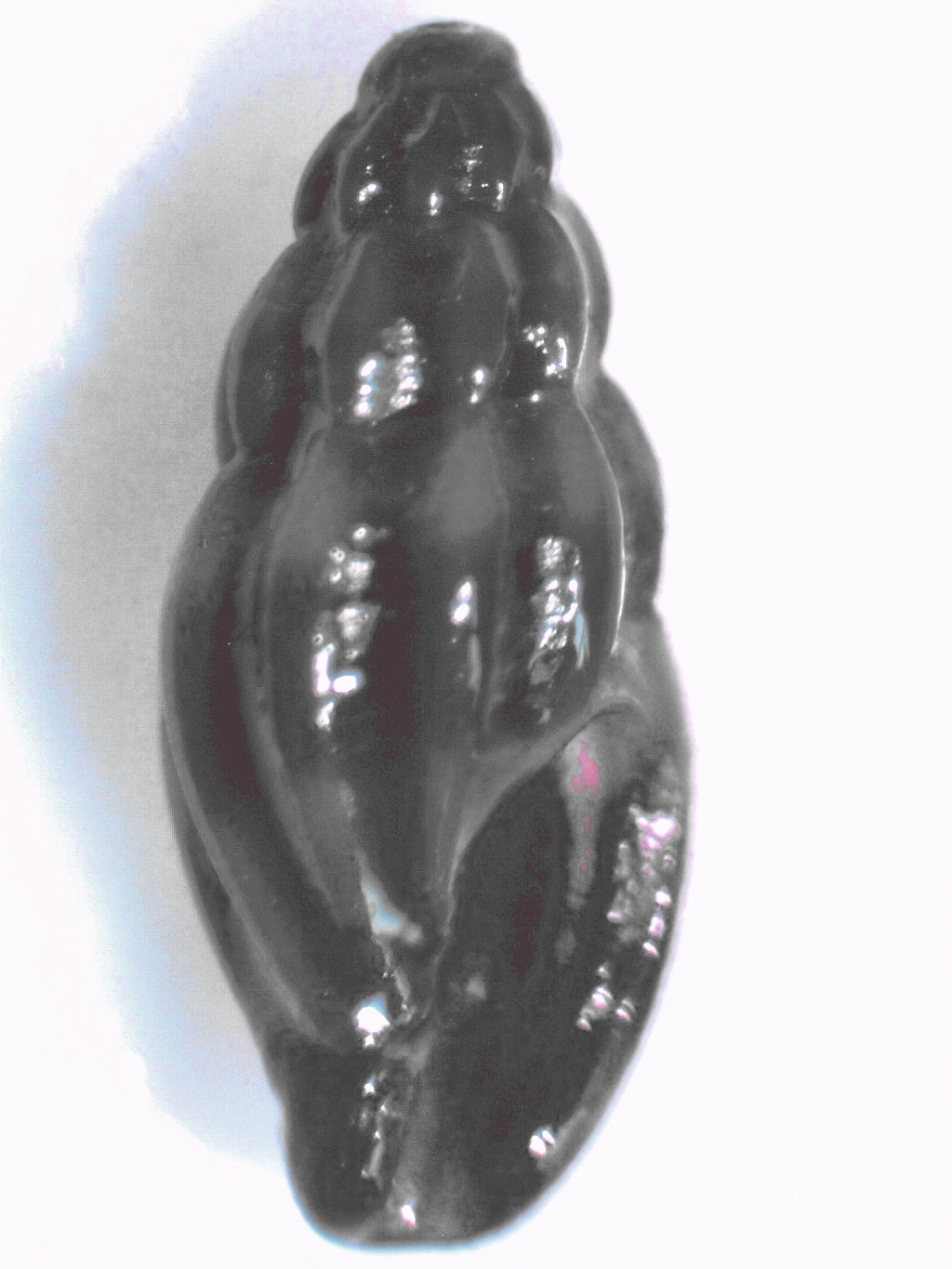
- Shell of Mangelia callosa

Scientific classification
- Kingdom: Animalia
- Phylum: Mollusca
- Class: Gastropoda
- Subclass: Caenogastropoda
- Order: Neogastropoda
- Superfamily: Conoidea
- Family: Mangeliidae
- Genus: Mangelia
- Species: M. callosa

Binomial name
- Mangelia callosa (Nordsieck, 1977)

Synonyms
- Cythara callosa Nordsieck, 1977 (original combination); Cythara derelicta callosa Nordsieck, 1977

= Mangelia callosa =

Species of gastropod

Mangelia callosa is a species of sea snail, a marine gastropod mollusk in the family Mangeliidae.

== Description ==
The shell grows to a length of 5 mm.

== Distribution ==
This species is found in the Aegean Sea off Turkey.
