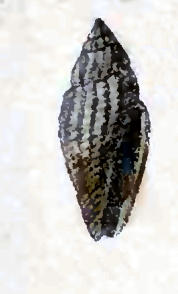
- Drawing of a shell of Eucithara angiostoma

Scientific classification
- Kingdom: Animalia
- Phylum: Mollusca
- Class: Gastropoda
- Subclass: Caenogastropoda
- Order: Neogastropoda
- Superfamily: Conoidea
- Family: Mangeliidae
- Genus: Eucithara
- Species: E. angiostoma

Binomial name
- Eucithara angiostoma (Pease, 1868)

Synonyms
- Cythara angiostoma Pease, 1868 (original combination); Eucithara triticea L.A. Reeve, 1843; Pleurotoma triticea (non Kiener, 1840); Reeve, 1843; Mangilia tritacea Tryon, 1884

= Eucithara angiostoma =

Species of marine gastropod

Eucithara angiostoma is a small sea snail, a marine gastropod mollusk in the family Mangeliidae.

This is not the organism previously described as Eucithara angiostoma Kay, 1979.

== Description ==
The length of the shell varies between 3 mm and 5 mm.

The longitudinal ribs are oblique. The transverse striae are very fine but distinct. The inner and outer lips are both corrugated. The color of the shell is whitish, with a broad central brown band on the back of the body whorl, which when the shell is worn appears as a spot.

== Distribution ==
This marine species occurs in the Indian Ocean (?), Polynesia, the Philippines.

== Further readings ==
- Pease, W. H. 1868. Synonymy of marine gastropodae inhabiting Polynesia. American 1. Conch. 4: 103-132
