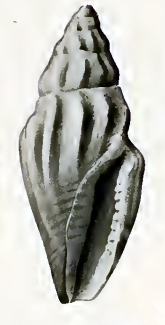
- Shell of Eucithara lyra

Scientific classification
- Kingdom: Animalia
- Phylum: Mollusca
- Class: Gastropoda
- Subclass: Caenogastropoda
- Order: Neogastropoda
- Superfamily: Conoidea
- Family: Mangeliidae
- Genus: Eucithara
- Species: E. lyra

Binomial name
- Eucithara lyra (Reeve, 1846)

Synonyms
- Cithara lyra (Reeve, 1846); Cythara citharella Smith, 1876; Eucithara citharella E.A. Smith, 1876; Mangelia lyra Reeve, 1846 (original combination)

= Eucithara lyra =

Species of gastropod

Eucithara lyra is a small sea snail, a marine gastropod mollusc in the family Mangeliidae.

== Description ==
The length of the shell attains 7 mm.

The color of the shell is light yellowish brown, or yellowish white, banded narrowly and numerously with chestnut.

== Distribution ==
This marine species occurs off the Philippines, Taiwan, and Queensland, Australia.
