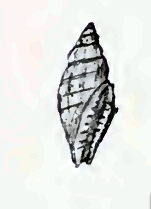
- Original image of a shell of Citharomangelia quadrilineata

Scientific classification
- Kingdom: Animalia
- Phylum: Mollusca
- Class: Gastropoda
- Subclass: Caenogastropoda
- Order: Neogastropoda
- Superfamily: Conoidea
- Family: Mangeliidae
- Genus: Citharomangelia
- Species: C. quadrilineata

Binomial name
- Citharomangelia quadrilineata (G. B. Sowerby III, 1913)

Synonyms
- Cythara quadrilineata G. B. Sowerby III, 1913 (original combination); Eucithara quadrilineata (G. B. Sowerby III, 1913)

= Citharomangelia quadrilineata =

Species of gastropod

Citharomangelia quadrilineata is a species of sea snail, a marine gastropod mollusk in the family Mangeliidae.

== Description ==
The length of the shell attains 8 mm, its diameter 3.5 mm.

This is a smooth, white shell with a fusiform-ovate shape and without spiral striae. The spire is sharply conical and slightly convex. It contains 5 whorls. The longitudinal plicae are somewhat distant, and smoothly rounded. The four light fulvous lines crossing the body whorl seem to be a constant character. The body whorl measures about two-thirds of the total length of the shell. The aperture is narrow. The sinus is not very deep. The columella is straight and slightly denticled. The siphonal canal is short and very wide.

R.N. Kilburn had doubts about the generic position of this species, because of the low, continuous, cord-like axial ribs and the smooth wide intervals.

== Distribution ==
This marine species occurs off Japan.
