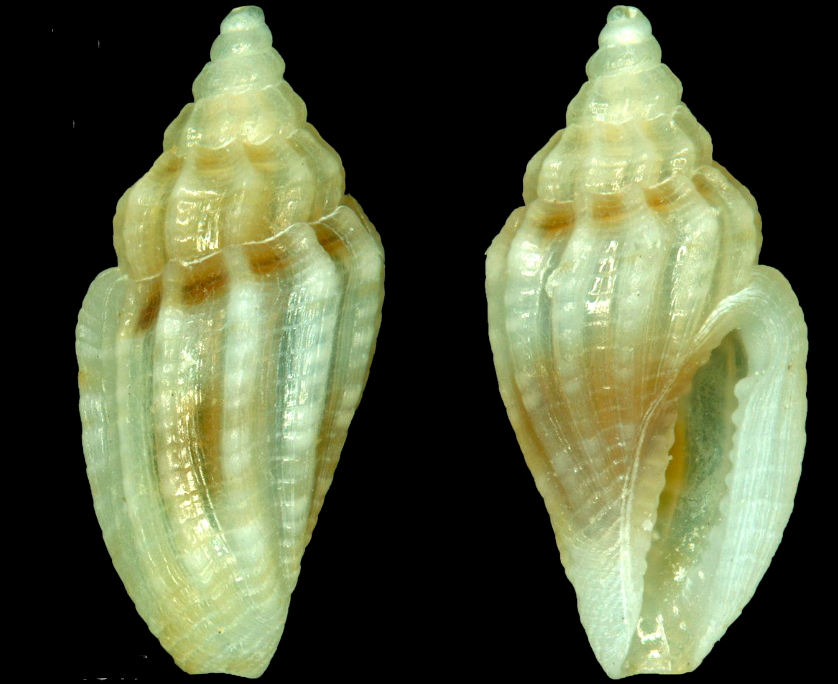
- Shell of Eucithara pusilla (specimen at Denver Museum of Nature & Science)

Scientific classification
- Kingdom: Animalia
- Phylum: Mollusca
- Class: Gastropoda
- Subclass: Caenogastropoda
- Order: Neogastropoda
- Superfamily: Conoidea
- Family: Mangeliidae
- Genus: Eucithara
- Species: E. pusilla

Binomial name
- Eucithara pusilla (Pease, 1860)

Synonyms
- Cythara pusilla Pease, 1860 (original combination)

= Eucithara pusilla =

Species of gastropod

Eucithara pusilla is a small sea snail, a marine gastropod mollusk in the family Mangeliidae.

== Description ==
The length of the shell attains 4.5 mm.

(Original description) The oval shell has a white color, stained with purplish brown. The whorls are longitudinally ribbed with somewhat oblique ribs and striated transversely. The whorls are angulated at the sutures. The outer and inner lip are denticulated. The spire is short. The outer lip is thickened.

== Distribution ==
This marine species occurs off Hawaii.
