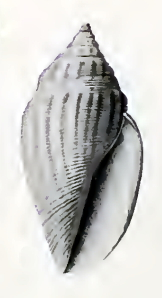
- Shell of Eucithara striatissima

Scientific classification
- Kingdom: Animalia
- Phylum: Mollusca
- Class: Gastropoda
- Subclass: Caenogastropoda
- Order: Neogastropoda
- Superfamily: Conoidea
- Family: Mangeliidae
- Genus: Eucithara
- Species: E. striatissima

Binomial name
- Eucithara striatissima (G. B. Sowerby III, 1907)

Synonyms
- Cythara striatissima G. B. Sowerby III, 1893 (original combination); Mangilia (Cithara) striatissima (Sowerby III, 1907)

= Eucithara striatissima =

Species of gastropod

Eucithara striatissima is a small sea snail, a marine gastropod mollusk in the family Mangeliidae.

== Description ==
The length of the shell is 9.5 mm, its diameter 4.6 mm.

The shell is small, broad, and has a biconical shape. It is densely encircled by spiral threads, of which there are about forty on the body whorl. About nineteen radials are projecting as tubercles along the angle of the shoulder, but faint above and below. On the earlier whorls the shoulder nodules are proportionately more prominent. The whole surface has a secondary sculpture of close microscopic radial threads. The shell contains 7 whorls, including a small smooth protoconch of two helicoid whorls. The aperture is incomplete, but commencing to form a varix and mounting on the preceding whorl.

== Distribution ==
This marine species occurs off New Caledonia and Queensland, Australia
