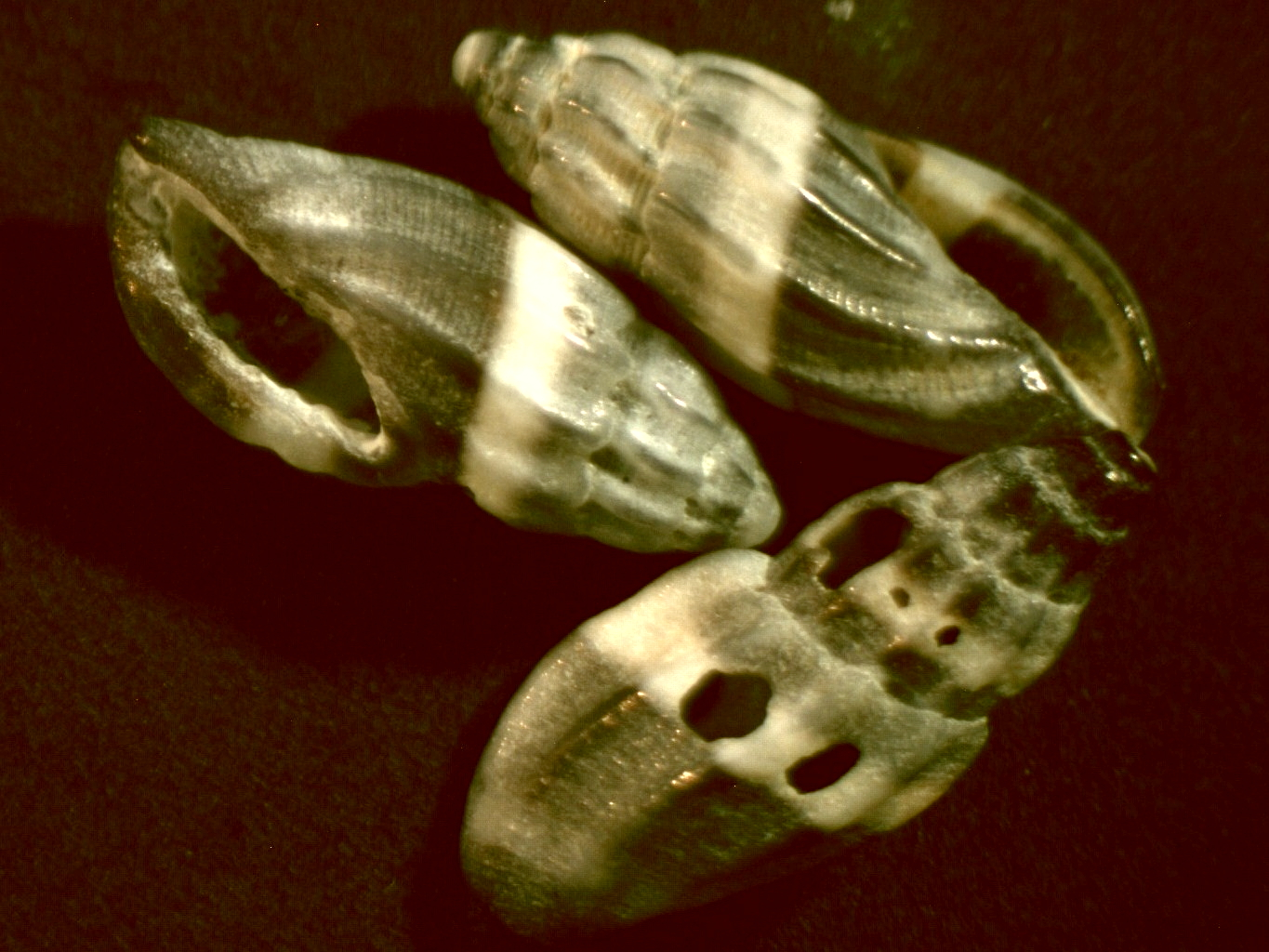
- Shells of Eucithara bicolor

Scientific classification
- Kingdom: Animalia
- Phylum: Mollusca
- Class: Gastropoda
- Subclass: Caenogastropoda
- Order: Neogastropoda
- Superfamily: Conoidea
- Family: Mangeliidae
- Genus: Eucithara
- Species: E. bicolor

Binomial name
- Eucithara bicolor (Reeve, 1846)

Synonyms
- Cythara bicolor (Reeve, 1846); Daphnella bicolor (Reeve, 1846); Mangelia bicolor Reeve, 1846 (original combination); Mangilia bicolor (Reeve, 1846)

= Eucithara bicolor =

Species of gastropod

Eucithara bicolor is a small sea snail, a marine gastropod mollusk in the family Mangeliidae.

== Description ==
The length of the shell attains 11 mm.

The interstices of the ribs are very finely transversely striated. The color of the shell is whitish above, but most of the body whorl lead-color.

== Distribution ==
This marine species occurs off the Philippines and Queensland (Australia).
