= Mangelia grisea =

Scientific classification
- Kingdom: Animalia
- Phylum: Mollusca
- Class: Gastropoda
- Subclass: Caenogastropoda
- Order: Neogastropoda
- Superfamily: Conoidea
- Family: Mangeliidae
- Genus: Mangelia
- Species: M. grisea

Binomial name
- Mangelia grisea (F. Nordsieck, 1977)

Synonyms
- Cythara grisea F. Nordsieck, 1977

Species of gastropod

Mangelia grisea is a species of sea snail, a marine gastropod mollusk in the family Mangeliidae.

This is a nomen dubium.

== Distribution ==
This marine species occurs in the Mediterranean Sea off Cagliari.
