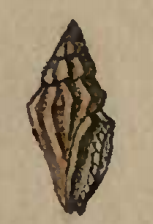
- Drawing of Citharomangelia pellucida

Scientific classification
- Kingdom: Animalia
- Phylum: Mollusca
- Class: Gastropoda
- Subclass: Caenogastropoda
- Order: Neogastropoda
- Superfamily: Conoidea
- Family: Mangeliidae
- Genus: Citharomangelia
- Species: C. pellucida

Binomial name
- Citharomangelia pellucida (Reeve, 1846)

Synonyms
- Clathromangelia pellucida (Reeve, 1846); Cythara pellucida (Reeve, 1846); Eucithara pellucida (Reeve, 1846); Mangelia pellucida Reeve, 1846; Mangilia pellucida Reeve, 1846

= Citharomangelia pellucida =

Species of gastropod

Citharomangelia pellucida is a species of sea snail, a marine gastropod mollusk in the family Mangeliidae.

== Description ==
The ovate shell is attenuated at both ends, smooth, transparent, shining, longitudinally closely ribbed. The color of the shell is whitish, brown at the base, sometimes with three narrow, interrupted bands.

== Distribution ==
This marine species occurs off Madagascar, the Philippines and off Queensland, Australia.
