= Paul Maurice Pallary =

French-Algerian malacologist (1869–1942)

- Born: 9 March 1869; Mers-el-Kebir, French Algeria
- Died: 9 January 1942 (aged 72); Oran, French Algeria
- Known for: Naming hundreds of mollusc species and some genera
- Scientific career
- Fields: Malacology; arachnology

Paul Maurice Pallary (9 March 1869, in Mers-el-Kebir, French Algeria – 9 January 1942, in Oran, Vichy French Algeria) was a French-Algerian malacologist and arachnologist.

His pioneering research on molluscs was mainly concentrated in the western part of the Mediterranean Sea and in the Middle East. He was a prolific writer on malacofauna, but his interests also extended to other fields of zoology, most notably arachnology, and he published several papers on scorpions. He additionally pursued geology, and in particular the prehistory of Northern Africa. He became known as the "Dean of North African Prehistory". In 1892, he discovered, together with François Doumergue, several paleolithic and neolithic caves at Cuartel and Kouchet El Djir, Oran.

Pallary named more than 100 mollusc species and even a few genera (Adansonia Pallary, 1902; Corbula (Physoida) Pallary, 1900; Orania Pallary, 1900).

Ten species have been named in his honour, some of which have become synonyms:

- Arbacina pallaryi Gauthier, 1897: synonym of Genocidaris maculata A. Agassiz, 1869
- Cirsotrema pallaryi de Boury, 1912: synonym of Cirsotrema cochlea (Sowerby G.B. II, 1844)
- Columbella pallaryi Dautzenberg, 1927: synonym of Mitrella pallaryi (Dautzenberg, 1927)
- Cythara pallaryi Nordsieck, 1977: synonym of Mangiliella pallaryi (Nordsieck, 1977) accepted as Mangelia pallaryi (Nordsieck, 1977)
- Mangelia pallaryi (Nordsieck, 1977)
- Mangiliella pallaryi (Nordsieck, 1977): synonym of Mangelia pallaryi (Nordsieck, 1977)
- Mitrella pallaryi (Dautzenberg, 1927)
- Raphitoma pallaryi Nordsieck, 1977
- Salmo pallaryi Pellegrin, 1924: synonym of Salmo trutta macrostigma (Duméril, 1858)
- Turbonilla pallaryi Dautzenberg, 1910
