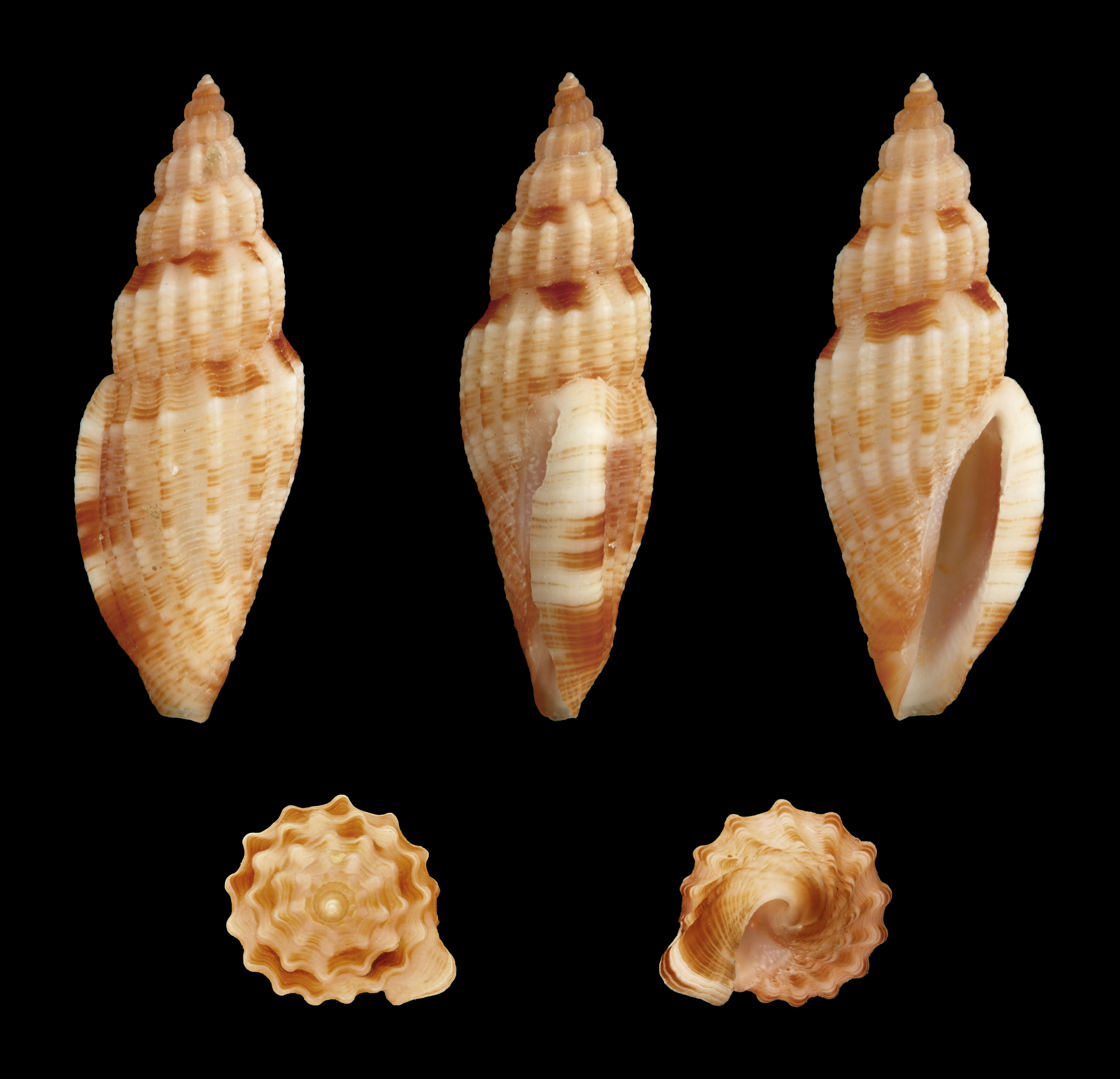
- Shell of Gingicithara cylindrica

Scientific classification
- Kingdom: Animalia
- Phylum: Mollusca
- Class: Gastropoda
- Subclass: Caenogastropoda
- Order: Neogastropoda
- Superfamily: Conoidea
- Family: Mangeliidae
- Genus: Gingicithara
- Species: G. cylindrica

Binomial name
- Gingicithara cylindrica (Reeve, 1846)

Synonyms
- Cythara cylindrica (Reeve, 1846); Eucithara cylindrica (Reeve, 1846); Mangelia cylindrica Reeve, 1846 (original combination)

= Gingicithara cylindrica =

Species of gastropod

Gingicithara cylindrica is a species of sea snail, a marine gastropod mollusk in the family Mangeliidae.

== Description ==
The shell of the adult snail varies between 4 mm and 18 mm.

The shell is slightly shouldered, longitudinally finely ribbed, the ribs attaining the suture, transversely elevately striated. It is transparent white, stained with pale brown, spotted on the shoulder with orange-brown.

Australian shells differ from the figure of Reeve by fewer and coarser radials, absence of subsutural colour markings, and a rather broader build.

== Distribution ==
This marine species occurs off the Philippines, Queensland, Australia, and off the Cook Islands
