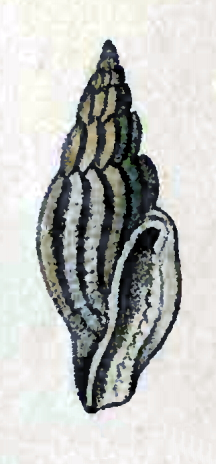
- Shell of Gingicithara lyrica

Scientific classification
- Kingdom: Animalia
- Phylum: Mollusca
- Class: Gastropoda
- Subclass: Caenogastropoda
- Order: Neogastropoda
- Superfamily: Conoidea
- Family: Mangeliidae
- Genus: Gingicithara
- Species: G. lyrica

Binomial name
- Gingicithara lyrica (Reeve, 1846)

Synonyms
- Cythara lyrica (Reeve, 1846); Daphnella lyrica (Reeve, 1846); Eucithara lyrica (Reeve, 1846); Mangelia lyrica Reeve, 1846 (original combination); Mangilia (Cythara) lyrica (Reeve, 1846); Mangilia lyrica (Reeve, 1846)

= Gingicithara lyrica =

Species of gastropod

Gingicithara lyrica is a species of sea snail, a marine gastropod mollusk in the family Mangeliidae.

== Description ==
The shell of the adult snail attains 11 mm.

The whorls are not shouldered. They are lightly longitudinally ribbed, crossed by revolving elevated striae. The color of the shell is light brown, indistinctly banded with orange-brown.

== Distribution ==
This marine species occurs off the Philippines, New Caledonia and Queensland, Australia.
