= Eucithara vittata =

Scientific classification
- Kingdom: Animalia
- Phylum: Mollusca
- Class: Gastropoda
- Subclass: Caenogastropoda
- Order: Neogastropoda
- Superfamily: Conoidea
- Family: Mangeliidae
- Genus: Eucithara
- Species: E. vittata

Binomial name
- Eucithara vittata (Hinds, 1843)

Synonyms
- Cythara abyssicola (Reeve, 1846); Cythara biclathrata S.M. Souverbie, 1872; Daphnella (Cythara) abyssicola (Reeve, 1846); Daphnella abyssicola (Reeve, 1846); Eucithara abyssicola (Reeve, 1846); Eucithara biclathrata S.M. Souverbie in S.M. Souverbie & R.P. Montrouzier, 1872; Eucithara rubrocincta E.A. Smith, 1882; Glyphostoma rubrocincta Smith, E.A., 1882; Mangelia abyssicola Reeve, 1846; Mangelia vittata Hinds, 1843 (original combination); Mangilia abyssicola (Reeve, 1846); Mangilia (Cythara) vittata (Reeve, 1846); Pleurotoma (Cithara) biclathrata Souverbie, 1872 (dubious synonym); Pleurotoma exquisita Smith, 1882; Raphitoma exquisita (E.A. Smith, 1882). (dubious synonym - possibly a Cytharopsis)

Species of gastropod

Eucithara vittata is a small sea snail, a marine gastropod mollusk in the family Mangeliidae.

== Description ==
The shell size varies between 5 mm and 15 mm.

== Distribution ==
This marine genus occurs off Australia (Queensland and Western Australia), off the Philippines, Irian Jaya and Fiji
