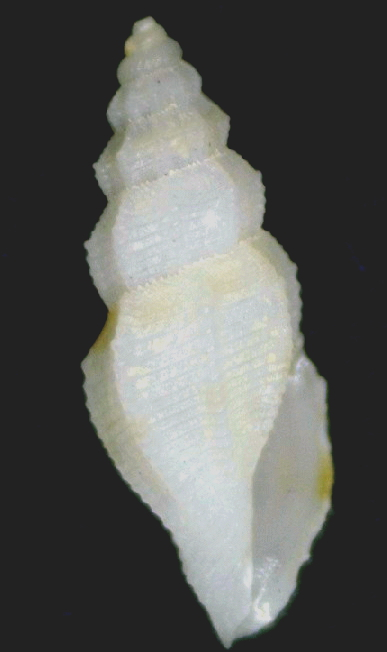
- Apertural view of a shell of Eucithara delacouriana

Scientific classification
- Kingdom: Animalia
- Phylum: Mollusca
- Class: Gastropoda
- Subclass: Caenogastropoda
- Order: Neogastropoda
- Superfamily: Conoidea
- Family: Mangeliidae
- Genus: Eucithara
- Species: E. delacouriana

Binomial name
- Eucithara delacouriana (Crosse, 1869)

Synonyms
- Cithara delacouriana Crosse, 1869 (original combination); Cithara matakuana E. A. Smith, 1884; Daphnella matakuana (E. A. Smith, 1884); Eucithara matakuana (E. A. Smith, 1884); Eucithara stromboides (non Reeve, 1846) Hedley, 1922; Mangilia (Cythara) matakuana (E. A. Smith, 1884)

= Eucithara delacouriana =

Species of gastropod

Eucithara delacouriana is a small sea snail, a marine gastropod mollusk in the family Mangeliidae.

== Distribution ==
This marine species if found off New Caledonia and Fiji

== Description ==
The length of the shell attains 10.8 mm, its diameter 4.5 mm.

The ribs are rounded, narrower than the interspaces, surmounting the slight shoulder-angle and attaining the suture. The revolving striae are very fine and close. The color of the shell is white, with traces of brown staining.

The shell is conspicuous for robustness of form, and dorsally blotched with burnt-sienna marking.
