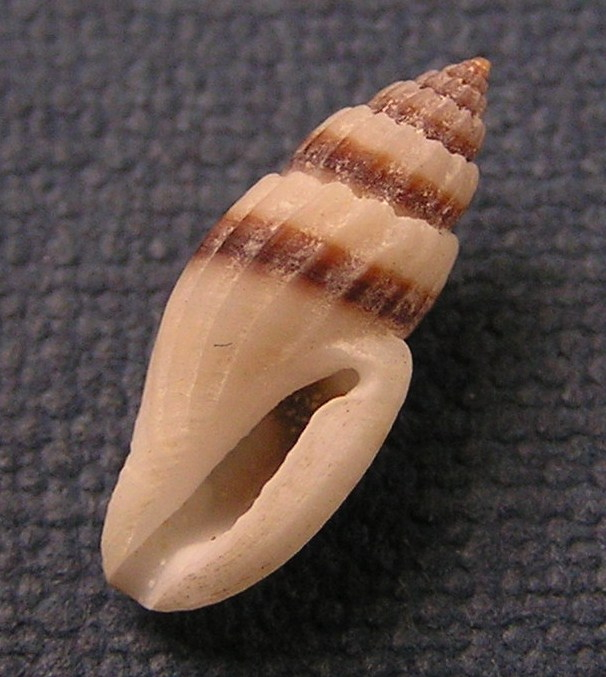
- Apertural view of a shell of Eucithara celebensis

Scientific classification
- Kingdom: Animalia
- Phylum: Mollusca
- Class: Gastropoda
- Subclass: Caenogastropoda
- Order: Neogastropoda
- Superfamily: Conoidea
- Family: Mangeliidae
- Genus: Eucithara
- Species: E. celebensis

Binomial name
- Eucithara celebensis (Hinds in Reeve, 1846)

Synonyms
- Cithara eupoecila Hervier, 1897; Cythara optabilis Sowerby, 1907; Cythara pessulata Brazier, 1876; Mangelia celebensis Hinds, 1843 (original combination); Mangilia psalterium Melvill & Standen, 1896

= Eucithara celebensis =

Species of gastropod

Eucithara celebensis is a small sea snail, a marine gastropod mollusk in the family Mangeliidae.

== Distribution ==
This marine species is found off the Philippines and Queensland, Australia.

== Description ==
The length of the shell varies between 6 mm and 15 mm.

The shell is smooth. It is plicately ribbed with the ribs rather distant. Its color is light yellowish and brown banded.
