= Mitrella canariensis =

Scientific classification
- Kingdom: Animalia
- Phylum: Mollusca
- Class: Gastropoda
- Subclass: Caenogastropoda
- Order: Neogastropoda
- Family: Columbellidae
- Genus: Mitrella
- Species: M. canariensis

Binomial name
- Mitrella canariensis (d'Orbigny, 1840)

Synonyms
- Buccinum canariense d'Orbigny, 1840; Columbella (Mitrella) pallaryi Dautzenberg, 1927 (superseded original combination); Columbella (Mitrella) vulpecula Pallary, 1900 (invalid: junior homonym of Columbella vulpecula G.B. Sowerby I, 1844; Columbella pallaryi is a replacement name); Columbella (Mitrella) vulpecula var. albida Pallary, 1900 (nomen nudum); Columbella pallaryi Dautzenberg, 1927 (original combination); Mitrella pallaryi (Dautzenberg, 1927); Pyrene pallaryi (Dautzenberg, 1927)

Species of gastropod

Mitrella canariensis is a species of sea snail in the family Columbellidae, the dove snails.

== Distribution ==
This marine species occurs off the Canary Islands.
