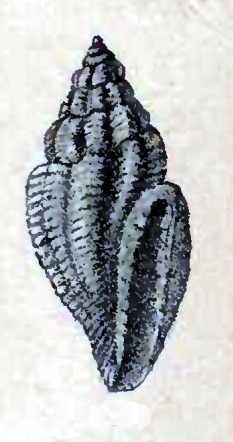
- Image of a shell of Eucithara isseli

Scientific classification
- Kingdom: Animalia
- Phylum: Mollusca
- Class: Gastropoda
- Subclass: Caenogastropoda
- Order: Neogastropoda
- Superfamily: Conoidea
- Family: Mangeliidae
- Genus: Eucithara
- Species: E. isseli

Binomial name
- Eucithara isseli (G. Nevill & H. Nevill, 1875)

Synonyms
- Cythara isseli Nevill & Nevill, 1875 (original combination); Mangelia (Cithara) isseli Nevill & Nevill, 1875

= Eucithara isseli =

Species of gastropod

Eucithara isseli is a small sea snail, a marine gastropod mollusk in the family Mangeliidae.

== Distribution ==
This marine species is found in the Red Sea and the Persian Gulf; off Sri Lanka; the Philippines and the Loyalty Islands.

== Description ==
The length of the shell varies between 8 mm and 12 mm.

The color of the shell is white, with two narrow, interrupted orange bands, one of which reappears on the spire.
