= Mangelia pallaryi =

Scientific classification
- Kingdom: Animalia
- Phylum: Mollusca
- Class: Gastropoda
- Subclass: Caenogastropoda
- Order: Neogastropoda
- Superfamily: Conoidea
- Family: Mangeliidae
- Genus: Mangelia
- Species: M. pallaryi

Binomial name
- Mangelia pallaryi (F. Nordsieck, 1977)

Synonyms
- Cythara pallaryi F. Nordsieck, 1977 (original combination); Mangelia (Mangiliella) pallaryi (F. Nordsieck, 1977); Mangilia kochi Pallary, 1904; Mangiliella pallaryi (Nordsieck, 1977)

Species of gastropod

Mangelia pallaryi is a species of sea snail, a marine gastropod mollusk in the family Mangeliidae.

== Description ==
The length of the shell attains 6 mm.

== Distribution ==
This marine species occurs in the Mediterranean Sea off of Tunisia.
