= Eucithara decussata =

Scientific classification
- Kingdom: Animalia
- Phylum: Mollusca
- Class: Gastropoda
- Subclass: Caenogastropoda
- Order: Neogastropoda
- Superfamily: Conoidea
- Family: Mangeliidae
- Genus: Eucithara
- Species: E. decussata

Binomial name
- Eucithara decussata (Pease, 1868)

Synonyms
- Cithara decussata Pease, 1868

Species of gastropod

Eucithara decussata is a small sea snail, a marine gastropod mollusk in the family Mangeliidae.

== Distribution ==
This marine species is found off Paumotus, Polynesia.

== Description ==
The length of the shell attains 10 mm, its diameter 4.5 mm.

(Original description) The white shell has a fusiform, ovate shape. The whorls are somewhat concavely, widely angulated around the upper part. They are longitudinally plicately ribbed. The ribs descend from the sutures and are nodulous at the angle, transversely elevated, striated, decussated by very finelongitudinal striae. The aperture is one-half the length of the shell.
