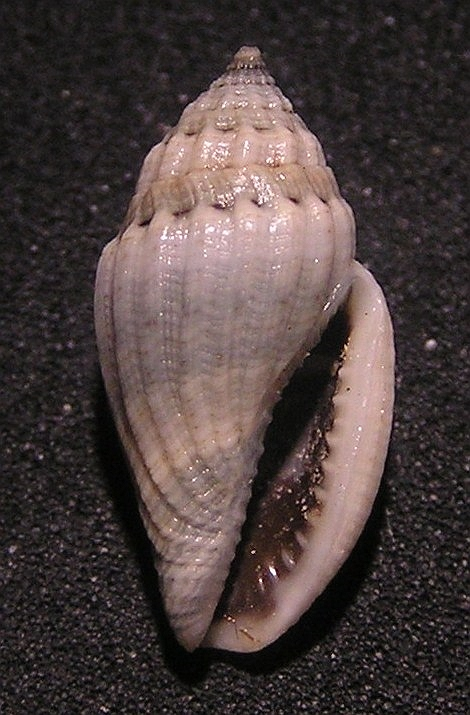
- Apertural view of a shell of Eucithara novaehollandiae

Scientific classification
- Kingdom: Animalia
- Phylum: Mollusca
- Class: Gastropoda
- Subclass: Caenogastropoda
- Order: Neogastropoda
- Superfamily: Conoidea
- Family: Mangeliidae
- Genus: Eucithara
- Species: E. novaehollandiae

Binomial name
- Eucithara novaehollandiae (Reeve, 1846)

Synonyms
- Cythara guestieri S.M. Souverbie in S.M. Souverbie & R.P. Montrouzier, 1872; Eucithara anna F.P. Jousseaume, 1883; Eucithara crassilabrum (Reeve, 1846); Mangelia anna Jousseaume, 1883; Mangelia crassilabrum Reeve, 1846; Mangelia novaehollandiae Reeve, 1846 (original combination); Mangilia (Cithara) guestieri (Souverbie in Souverbie & Montrouzier, 1872); Mangilia reevei Tryon, 1884; Pleurotoma (Cithara) guestieri Souverbie in Souverbie & Montrouzier, 1872

= Eucithara novaehollandiae =

Species of gastropod

Eucithara novaehollandiae, common name the thick-lipped mangelia, is a small sea snail, a marine gastropod mollusk in the family Mangeliidae.

== Description ==
The length of the shell varies between 5 mm and 11 mm.

The shell is longitudinally plicately ribbed. The ribs cross the shoulder to the suture. The color of the shell is yellowish white or light brown, banded with pale chocolate, crossed with numerous obscure fine white lines.

The oblong shell has a short spire and is a little turreted. The whorls are rounded at the upper part and longitudinally closely ribbed. The outer lip is more than usually thickened. The shell has a lead color or is banded with lead color, crossed with numerous obscure fine white lines.

== Distribution ==
This marine species occurs off the Philippines, Polynesia, New Caledonia, Western Australia and Mozambique.
