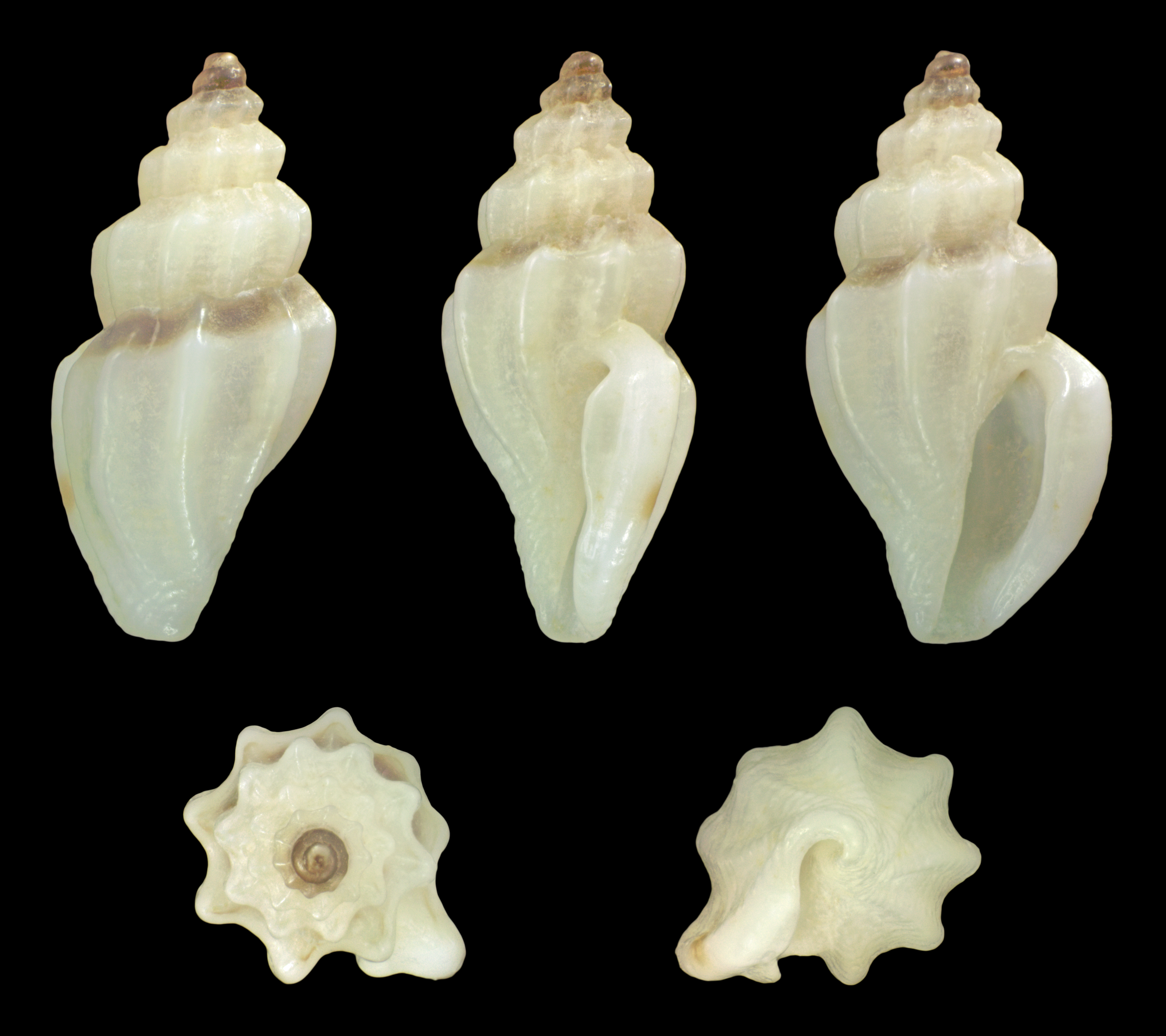
- Image of a shell of Mangelia vauquelini

Scientific classification
- Kingdom: Animalia
- Phylum: Mollusca
- Class: Gastropoda
- Subclass: Caenogastropoda
- Order: Neogastropoda
- Superfamily: Conoidea
- Family: Mangeliidae
- Genus: Mangelia
- Species: M. vauquelini

Binomial name
- Mangelia vauquelini (Payraudeau, 1826)

Synonyms
- Mangelia vauquelini E. Réquien, 1848; Mangelia vauquelini É.A.A. Locard & E. Caziot, 1900; Mangelia vauquelini M.E.J. Bucquoy, P. Dautzenberg & G.F. Dollfus, 1883; Mangelia vauquelini T.A. de M. Monterosato, 1878; Mangilia vauquelini (Payraudeau, 1826); Pleurotoma vauquelini Payraudeau, 1826

= Mangelia vauquelini =

Species of gastropod

Mangelia vauquelini is a species of sea snail, a marine gastropod mollusk in the family Mangeliidae.

== Description ==
The length of the shell varies between 9 mm and 15 mm.

The shell is pale yellowish or almost white. It shows distant strong ribs. The shoulder has brown dashes or spots, appearing on the ribs only. There is usually, on the body whorl a central line of spots, also on the ribs.

== Distribution ==
This species occurs in European waters off Portugal and Spain and in the Mediterranean Sea off Apulia, Italy, and Greece .
