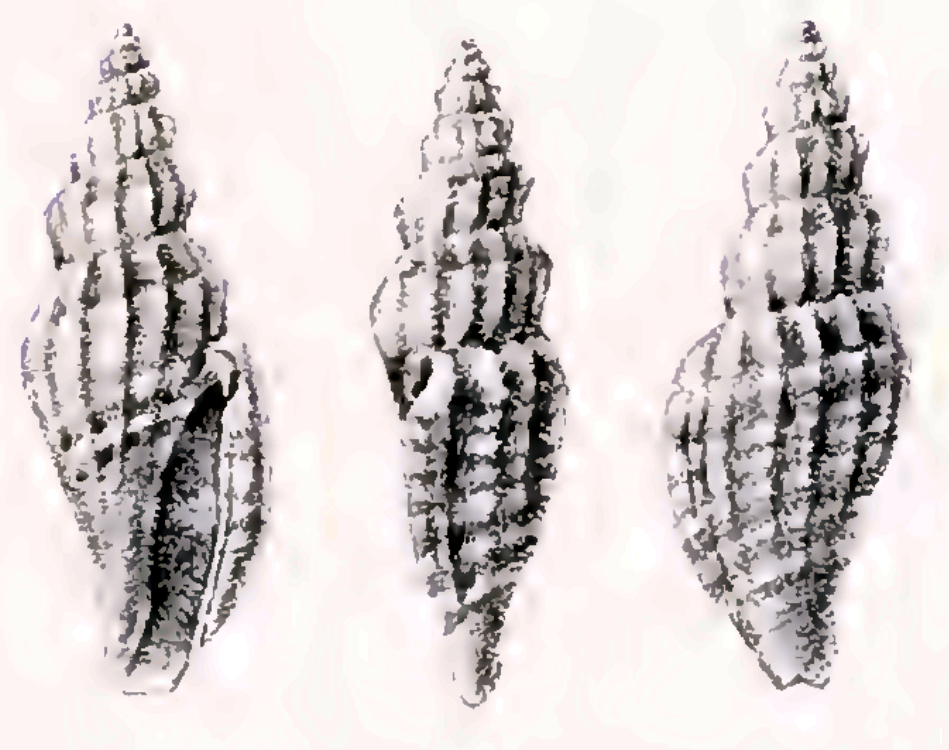
- Original image of a shell of Citharomangelia africana

Scientific classification
- Kingdom: Animalia
- Phylum: Mollusca
- Class: Gastropoda
- Subclass: Caenogastropoda
- Order: Neogastropoda
- Superfamily: Conoidea
- Family: Mangeliidae
- Genus: Citharomangelia
- Species: C. africana

Binomial name
- Citharomangelia africana (G. B. Sowerby III, 1903)

Synonyms
- Cythara africana (G. B. Sowerby III, 1903); Mangilia (Eucythara) africana G. B. Sowerby III, 1903

= Citharomangelia africana =

Species of gastropod

Citharomangelia africana is a species of sea snail, a marine gastropod mollusk in the family Mangeliidae.

== Description ==
The length of the shell attains 21.4 mm, its diameter 6.4 mm.

(Original description) The shell has a fusiform shape, acuminated at both ends and obtusely angled in the middle. It is somewhat obscurely banded with light and dark brown, with narrow whitish interstices, dark purplish brown between the angle and the suture. The spire is rather long and acute. The shell contains 7 whorls, angularly convex, finely spirally striated throughout and longitudinally regularly ribbed. The ribs are narrow, rather distant (12 on the penultimate whorl). The body whorl is longer than the spire, angular above, then slightly convex, attenuated towards the base, terminating in a short narrow slightly recurved rostrum. The aperture is long, rather wide in the middle, and narrower at each end. The interior is closely plicated, dark brown with a whitish median band. The columella is rather straight, recurved at the base and is furnished with numerous small plicae. The outer lip is sharp at the edge, externally thickened by a stout rounded varix. The posterior sinus is shallow, but rather wide.

== Distribution ==
This marine species occurs off Mozambique, and off KwaZulu-Natal, South Africa, at depths between 34 m and 50 m.
