= Phuti =

Phuti may refer to:

== People ==
- Phuti Mahanyele (born c. 1971), a South African business executive
- Phuti Lekoloane (born c. 1991), a South African footballer and LGBTQ activist
- Lako Phuti Bhutia (born 1994), an Indian women footballer

== Others ==
- Phuti karpas, a variety of Gossypium arboreum
- Phuti Masjid, a mosque in Kumarpur, India

== See also ==
- Puti (disambiguation)
- Putti (disambiguation)
- Putty (disambiguation)
- Potti (disambiguation)
- Putte (disambiguation)
