= Putt (surname) =

Putt is a surname. Notable people with the surname include:

- Amanda Putt (born 1990), American middle-distance runner
- Albert Putt (1927–2007), New Zealand cricketer
- Andrew Putt (born 1998), American motorcycle trials rider
- Archibald Putt (20th century), American writer
- Dean Putt (born 1989), Australian rules footballer
- Gorley Putt (1913–1995), British academic and author
- Leo Putt (born 1976), Thai singer
- Nixon Putt (born 1995), Papua New Guinean rugby league footballer
- Peg Putt (born 1953), Australian
- Thomas Putt, 1st Baronet (1644–1686), English politician

Nickname

- Putt Choate (born 1956), American football linebacker

== See also ==
- Putt (disambiguation)
- Putte (disambiguation)
