= Van Putten =

Van Putten is a Dutch toponymic surname meaning "from Putten". Most often Putten would have referred to the town Putten in Gelderland or the former island of Putten in South Holland. People with this name include:

- Evalina van Putten (born 1992), Curaçaoan beauty pageant winner
- Maartje van Putten (born 1951), Dutch politician
- Marijn van Putten (born 1988), Dutch historical linguist

== See also ==
- Putten (disambiguation)
- Van de Putte - surname
- Van Putte - surname (especially in the United States)
- Van der Putten - surname
- Van Petten (disambiguation)
- Gwendoline van Putten School, sole secondary school on the island of Sint Eustatius
