= Put =

Put or PUT may refer to:

== Finance ==
- Put option, a financial contract between a buyer and a seller
- CBOE S&P 500 PutWrite Index (ticker symbol)

== Science and technology ==
- Programmable unijunction transistor

=== Computing ===
- Parameterized unit testing, in computer programming
- Put, a Hypertext Transfer Protocol request method
- Put, a File Transfer Protocol option to copy a file to a remote system; see List of FTP commands
- Put, an output procedure in Pascal, Turing, and other programming languages
  - In C, simple functions, puts and puts(), that put text on the screen

== Education ==
- Petroleum University of Technology, Abadan, Ahvaz, Mahmud Abad and Tehran, Iran
- Poznań University of Technology, Poland (Polish name: Politechnika Poznańska)

== Transportation ==
- Pui To stop (MTR station code), Hong Kong
- Putney railway station (National Rail station code), London
- Sri Sathya Sai Airport (IATA code), Puttaparthi, Andhra Pradesh, India

== Other uses ==
- Phut or Put, Biblical grandson of Noah
- Put (band), from Rijeka, Croatia
- Put (card game), a 16th-century card game

== See also ==
- Putt (disambiguation)
- Putte (disambiguation)
