= Putt =

Putt can refer to:

- Putt (golf), golf stroke
- Putt (surname)
- Putt baronets, a title in the Baronetage of England
- Pitch and putt, sport similar to golf
- Miniature golf, also known as mini-putt or putt-putt
- Putt (card game), a trick-taking game

== See also ==
- Put (disambiguation)
- Putt-Putt (disambiguation)
- Putte (disambiguation)
