= Woensdrecht (village) =

- Village
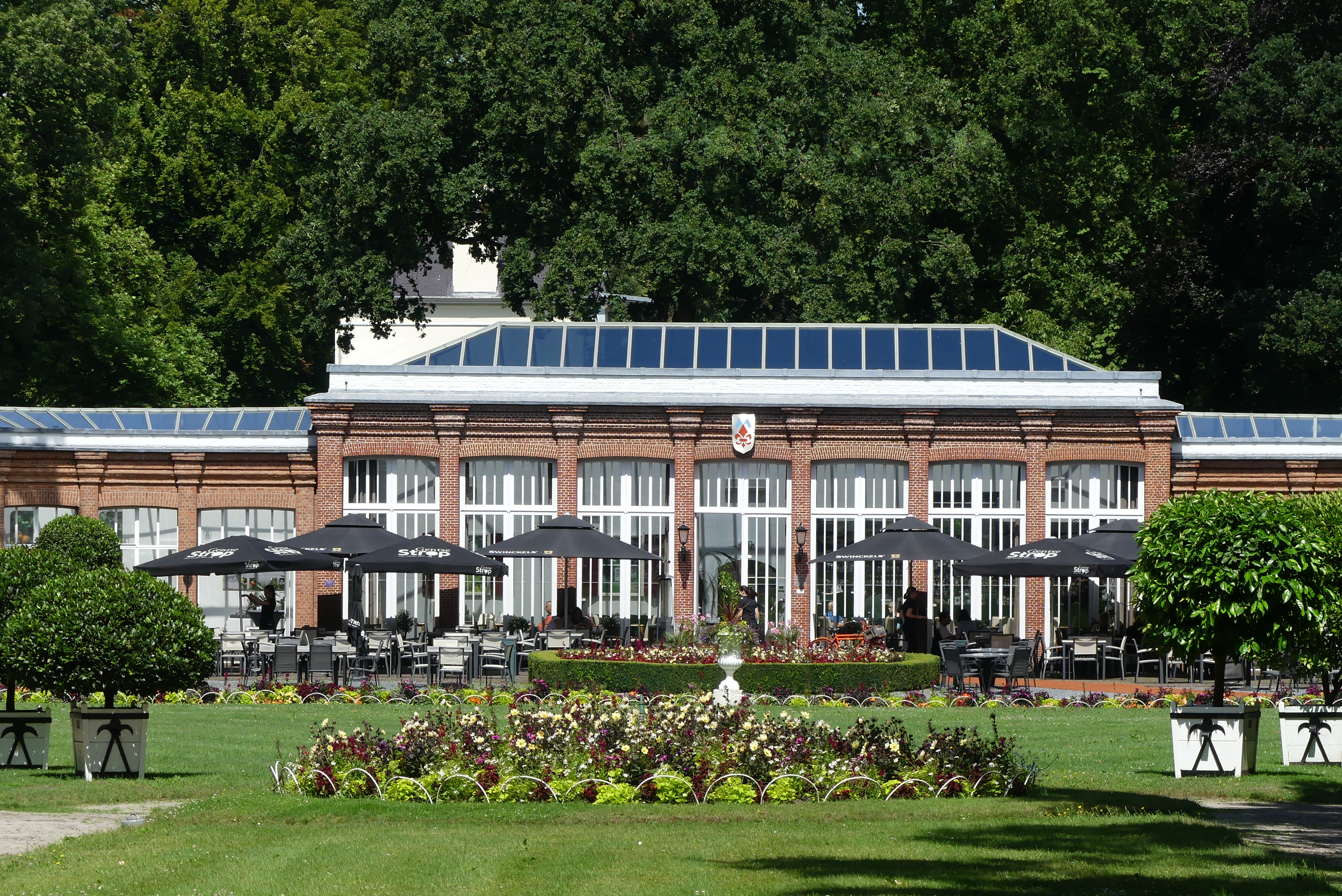
- Mattemburgh

- Location in the province of North Brabant in the Netherlands Woensdrecht (Netherlands)
- Coordinates: 51°25′46″N 4°17′57″E
- Country: Netherlands
- Province: North Brabant
- Municipality: Woensdrecht

Area
  - Total: 14.94 km^{2} (5.77 sq mi)
- Elevation: 1.2 m (3.9 ft)

Population (2021)
  - Total: 1,475
  - Density: 98.73/km^{2} (255.7/sq mi)
- Time zone: UTC+1 (CET)
  - Summer (DST): UTC+2 (CEST)
- Postal code: 4634
- Dialing code: 0164

Woensdrecht is a village in the municipality of Woensdrecht, North Brabant, Netherlands. Woensdrecht is known for Woensdrecht Air Base, a military air base.

== History ==
The village was first mentioned in 1249 as Wunsdrecht. The etymology is unclear. Woensdrecht developed in the Middle Ages on the border of sand and clay ground. In 1583 and 1584, the village was destroyed during the Eighty Years' War and was resettled after 1590.

Woensdrecht was home to 792 people in 1840. During the 20th century, Woensdrecht and Hoogerheide merged into a single urban area. In 1935, a little airfield was built near the village. During World War II, Woensdrecht Air Base became a large military airport, and remained a military airport after the war. In 1944, it was severely damaged by war, and the ruinous church tower has remained.

In 1983, it was announced that 48 nuclear cruise missiles were to be installed in Woensdrecht and the village became the site of frequent anti-nuclear protests. Despite strong opposition against nuclear weapons, the government decided to place the cruise missiles, but with a two-year delay. On 8 December 1987, the Intermediate-Range Nuclear Forces Treaty was signed which resulted in a cancellation of the cruise missiles in the Netherlands.
