= Potti (disambiguation) =

Potti, also written as Potty, is a sect of Brahmins in the Kerala state of India.

Potti may also refer to:

== People ==
- Anil Potti, physician
- A. V. Vasudevan Potti, Indian poet
- Sukumaran Potti, Indian writer
- Potti Prasad, Indian actor
- Potti Sreeramulu, Indian revolutionary
- Potti Veeraiah, Indian actor and comedian

== Organisms ==
- Leiocithara potti, a species of sea snail
- Drillia potti, a species of sea snail

== See also ==
- Potty (disambiguation)
- Poti, place in Samegrelo-Zemo Svaneti, Georgia
- "Potti Kadai" Pazhani, a fictional character in the 2014 Indian film Jigarthanda, played by Sangili Murugan
