= Jakob Birnbaum =

Polish diamond dealer

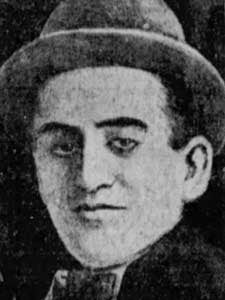
- Born: August 24, 1887; Kraków, Austria-Hungary
- Died: April 15, 1912 (aged 24); Atlantic Ocean
- Other name: Jacob Bernbaun
- Occupation: Diamond Dealer

Jakob Brinbaum (August 24, 1887 – April 15, 1912) was a Polish Jewish diamond dealer who died during the sinking of the Titanic.

== Early life ==
Jakob was born in 1887 in Kraków, Austria, to Austrian Jews Jeruchim Birnbaum (1856–1931) and Theophila Cypres (1863–1946). Jakob moved to San Francisco, California in 1909 and established a diamond firm called Jacob Birnbaum & Co. of San Francisco. In 1910, he lived as a boarder in the household of Ernest and Sophie Dreyfuss at 47 West 117th Street in Manhattan, New York City. In 1912, he traveled to a house he owned in Antwerp, Belgium on a business trip.

== RMS Titanic ==
Jakob was originally going to return to the U.S. at an earlier date but was persuaded to stay with his family to celebrate Passover. After celebrating with his family, Jakob bought a first class ticket for the RMS Titanic for £26 and boarded the ship at Cherbourg-Octeville on April 10, 1912. Jakob died during the sinking and his body was discovered by the CS Mackay-Bennett:

NO. 148. - MALE. - ESTIMATED AGE, 28. - DARK HAIR.

CLOTHING - Light grey overcoat; blue pajamas.

EFFECTS - Gold glasses; gold ring marked "J. B."; 2 pairs tweezers; 2 bunches keys; 1 gold watch chain; scissors; papers; nail file; 2 memo books; pocket knife; diamond solitaire tie pin; purse.

FIRST CLASS NAME - JACOB BERNBAUN, San Francisco.

Jakob's body was transported to and buried in a Jewish cemetery in a town Putte.
