= Woensdrecht Air Base =

Woensdrecht Air Base Vliegbasis Woensdrecht

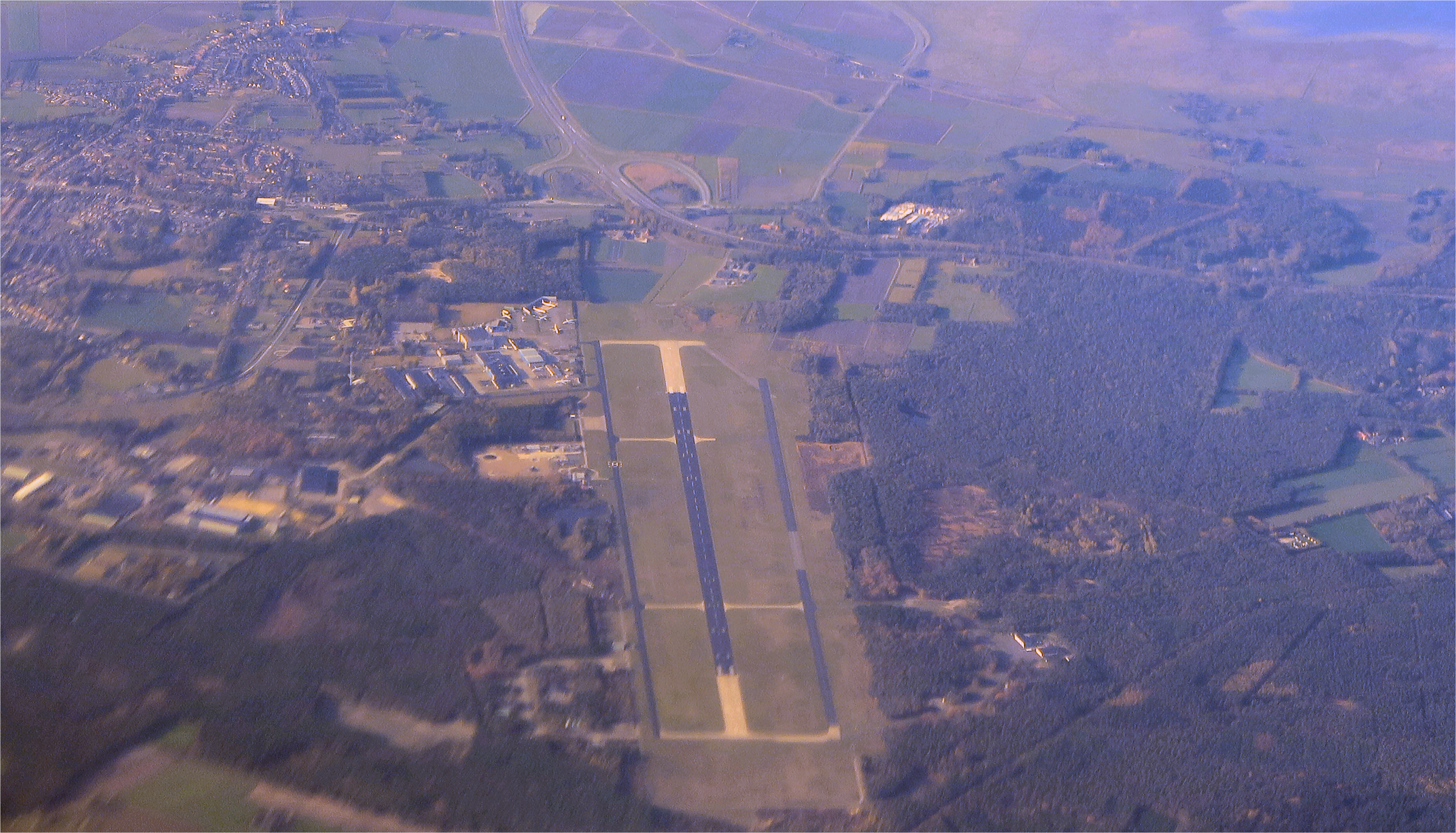
- IATA: WOE; ICAO: EHWO

Summary
- Airport type: Military
- Operator: Royal Netherlands Air and Space Force
- Serves: Bergen op Zoom, Netherlands
- Location: Woensdrecht
- Elevation AMSL: 63 ft (19 m)
- Coordinates: 51°26′56″N 004°20′30″E

Map
- Location of Woensdrecht Air Base

Runways
Direction	Length		Surface
Direction	m	ft	Surface
07/25	2,440	8,005	Concrete/asphalt

Woensdrecht Air Base (Dutch: Vliegbasis Woensdrecht) (IATA: WOE, ICAO: EHWO) is a military airport between the villages of Woensdrecht and Huijbergen, about 10 kilometres (6.2 mi) south of the city of Bergen op Zoom in the Netherlands. It is located near the A58 motorway and the border with Belgium.

The airport was founded in 1934 as a glider and training airfield for the Royal Netherlands Air Force (RNLAF). During German occupation in the Second World War, the airfield was expanded. Messerschmitt Bf 109 and later Focke-Wulf Fw 190 aircraft were deployed here by the Luftwaffe. The airfield was captured by Allied forces in December 1944 and used as an Advanced Landing Ground. After the war, it was used once again by the RNLAF for training purposes. In 1983 it was decided that Woensdrecht would house 48 Ground Launched Cruise Missiles fitted with nuclear warheads for the 486th Tactical Missile Wing of the U.S. Seventeenth Air Force. The missile wing would have had a maximum complement of 1100 personnel. However, just after completion of the required facilities, the Intermediate-Range Nuclear Forces Treaty put a halt to these plans.

The airport currently has one runway, 07/25, which is 2,440 metres (8,010 ft) long. It is now mainly used by the Royal Netherlands Air and Space Force as a training and logistical base and normally does not house any combat units. It currently also has one civilian user, Fokker Services, a company providing maintenance, primarily but not exclusively for Fokker aircraft. Because of the presence of Fokker Services, many Fokker aircraft are usually present at the airfield. The RNLASF mainly operates the Pilatus PC-7 for elementary flying training from this air base.
