= Potty =

Potty may refer to:

- Chamber pot
- Potty chair

== People ==
- Maxime Potty, Belgian race car driver
- P. Aisha Potty, Indian politician

== See also ==
- Poti
- Potti (disambiguation)
- Potty mouth (disambiguation)
