= Putte =

- Municipality
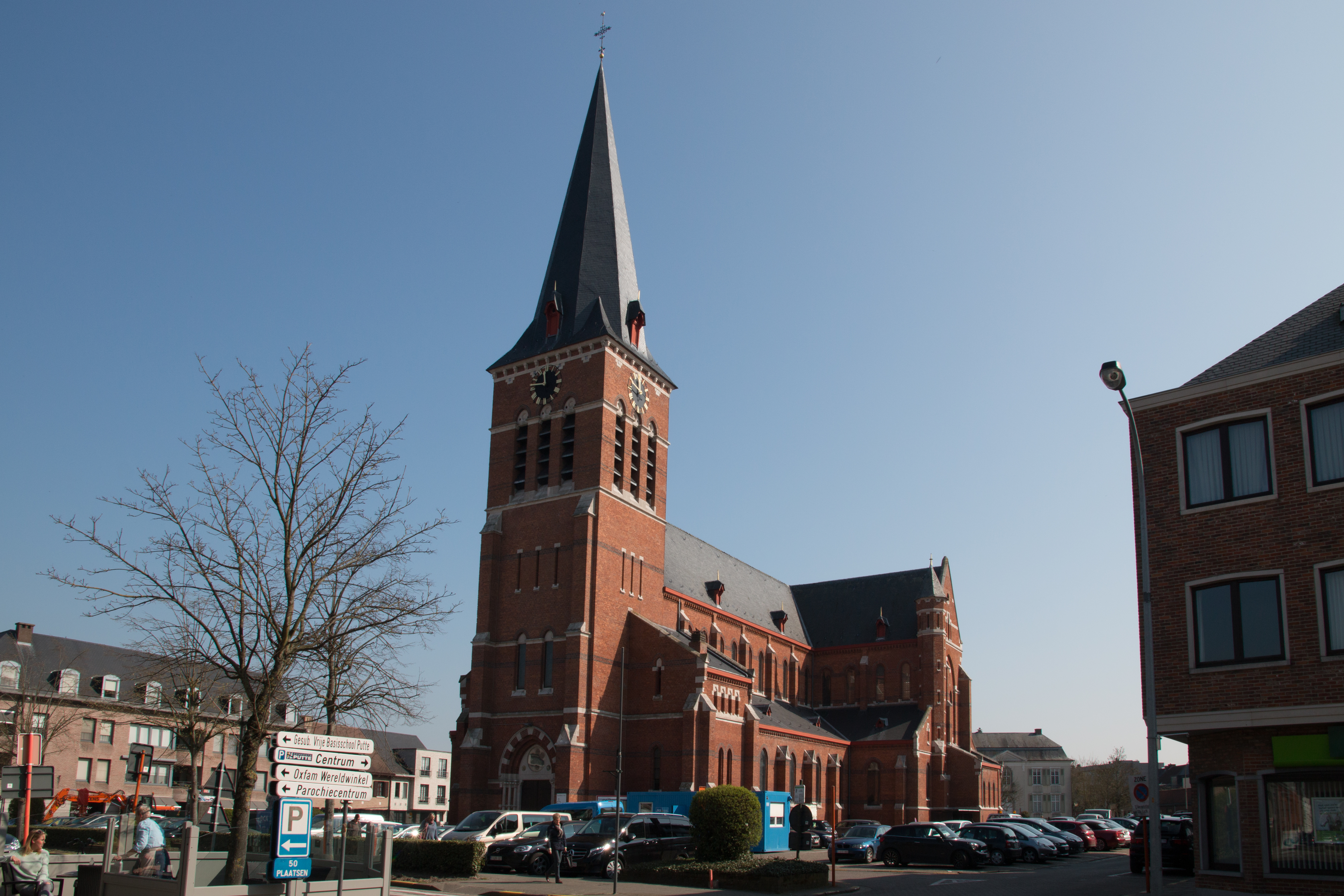

- Flag Coat of arms

- Location of Putte in the province of Antwerp
- Interactive map of Putte
- Location in Belgium
- Coordinates: 51°03′N 04°38′E
- Country: Belgium
- Community: Flemish Community
- Region: Flemish Region
- Province: Antwerp
- Arrondissement: Mechelen

Government
  - Mayor: Peter Gysbrechts (Open Vld)
  - Governing parties: Open Vld, N-VA

Area
  - Total: 35.16 km^{2} (13.58 sq mi)

Population (2018-01-01)
  - Total: 17,584
  - Density: 500.1/km^{2} (1,295/sq mi)
- Postal codes: 2580
- NIS code: 12029
- Area codes: 015, 03
- Website: www.putte.be

Putte (Dutch pronunciation: [ˈpʏtə]) is a municipality located in the Belgian province of Antwerp. The municipality includes the towns of Putte, Beerzel, and the hamlets Grasheide and Peulis. The town of Putte is around 8 kilometres (5.0 mi) east of Mechelen. In 2021, Putte had a total population of 18,109. The total area is 34.96 km^{2}.

With an altitude of 51.60 metres (169.3 ft), the Beerzelberg in Beerzel is the highest point of the Antwerp province.

Putte should not be confused with the homonymous municipality in the region of Kempen, split by the border into Putte, Netherlands and Putte, Kapellen.

== See also ==
- Van de Putte and Van der Putten
