= Puddy =

Puddy may refer to:

== People ==
- Bill Puddy (1916–1999), Canadian swimmer
- Don Puddy (1937–2004), NASA flight controller
- Hal Puddy (1924–1975), American football player
- Maude Mary Puddy (1883–1974), Australian pianist
- Will Puddy (born 1987), English footballer

== Fictional characters ==
- David Puddy, recurring character on Seinfeld (1995–1998)
- Puddy the Pup, character in Terrytoons short films (1935–1942)
- Puddy Tat, nickname for Sylvester the Cat by Tweety Bird in Looney Tunes cartoons

== See also ==
- Putty (disambiguation)
