= Putte (disambiguation) =

Putte is a Belgian municipality in the Province of Antwerp, near Mechelen

Putte may also refer to:

Places

Villages on the border between the Netherlands and Belgium:

- Putte, Kapellen, part of the Belgian municipality of Kapellen (and Stabroek)
- Putte, Netherlands, part of the municipality of Woensdrecht

People

- nickname of Ingvar Carlsson (ice hockey) (born 1942), Swedish retired ice hockey player and head coach
- nickname of Götrik Frykman (1891-1944), Swedish bandy and football player
- nickname of Rudolf Putte Kock (1901–1979), Swedish football, ice hockey and bridge player
- Hans Olof Putte Wickman (1924-2006), Swedish jazz clarinetist

== See also ==
- Putt (disambiguation)
- Putten (disambiguation)
- Van De Putte, a surname
- Putti (disambiguation)
