= Leiocithara translucens =

Scientific classification
- Kingdom: Animalia
- Phylum: Mollusca
- Class: Gastropoda
- Subclass: Caenogastropoda
- Order: Neogastropoda
- Superfamily: Conoidea
- Family: Mangeliidae
- Genus: Leiocithara
- Species: L. translucens

Binomial name
- Leiocithara translucens (Barnard, 1958)

Synonyms
- Mangilia translucens Barnard, 1958 (original combinatio

Species of gastropod

Leiocithara translucens is a species of sea snail, a marine gastropod mollusk in the family Mangeliidae.

== Description ==
The length of the shell attains 5 mm, its diameter 2.3 mm.

== Distribution ==
This species occurs off Transkei, South Africa, at a depth between 50 m and 120 m.
