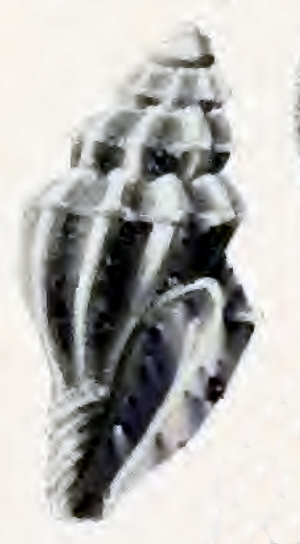
- Original image of a shell of Leiocithara infulata

Scientific classification
- Kingdom: Animalia
- Phylum: Mollusca
- Class: Gastropoda
- Subclass: Caenogastropoda
- Order: Neogastropoda
- Superfamily: Conoidea
- Family: Mangeliidae
- Genus: Leiocithara
- Species: L. infulata

Binomial name
- Leiocithara infulata (Hedley, 1909)

Synonyms
- Eucithara infulata (Hedley, 1909); Mangelia infulata Hedley, 1909 (original combination)

= Leiocithara infulata =

Species of gastropod

Leiocithara infulata is a species of sea snail, a marine gastropod mollusk in the family Mangeliidae.

== Description ==
The length of the shell attains 3.5 mm, its diameter 1.7 mm.

(Original description) The small shell is very solid, regularly biconical and sharply angled at the shoulder. Its colour is white, or pale buff with narrow bands of darker buff. It contains 5 whorls, including a protoconch of two smooth rounded whorls. The body whorl measures two-thirds of the shell's length.

Sculpture: on the body- whorl are eight widely spaced thick and prominent vertical ribs radiating from the suture, and vanishing on the base. On the shoulder these are linked and overrun by a spiral cord of nearly equal calibre. This sculpture is repeated on the penultimate whorl, where the radials are smaller and closer. On the antepenultimate whorl the spiral cord degenerates, and the radials are closer, rounder, and more oblique. Apart from this, the shell has, in general, a smooth expression, but a few faint spirals mark the base, while still fainter scratches traverse the rest of the shell. The aperture is narrow, protected by a heavy outstanding varix, anteriorly with a semicircular excavation, followed by a tubercle on either side. The siphonal canal is short, broad and effuse.

== Distribution ==
This marine species is endemic to Australia and occurs off Queensland.
