= Leiocithara macrocephala =

Scientific classification
- Kingdom: Animalia
- Phylum: Mollusca
- Class: Gastropoda
- Subclass: Caenogastropoda
- Order: Neogastropoda
- Superfamily: Conoidea
- Family: Mangeliidae
- Genus: Leiocithara
- Species: L. macrocephala

Binomial name
- Leiocithara macrocephala (Thiele, 1925)

Synonyms
- Mangelia macrocephala Thiele, 1925 (original combination)

Species of gastropod

Leiocithara macrocephala is a species of sea snail, a marine gastropod mollusk in the family Mangeliidae.

== Distribution ==
This species occurs off Sumatra, Indonesia.
