= Beerzel =

Village in the Flemish Region of Belgium

- Village
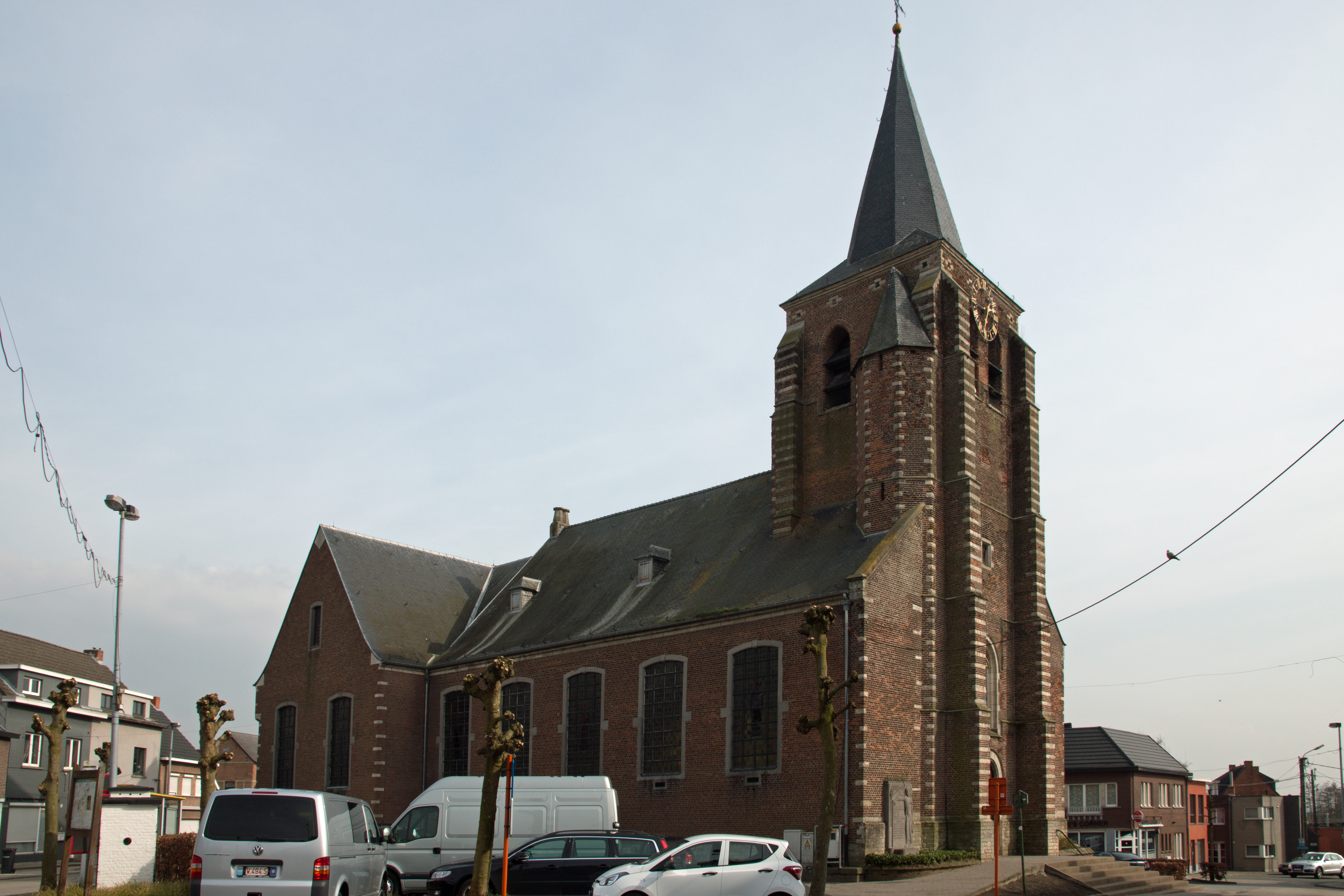
- Saint Remigus Church

- Location in Belgium
- Coordinates: 51°04′N 4°40′E
- Country: Belgium
- Region: Flemish Region
- Province: Antwerp
- Municipality: Putte

Area
  - Total: 7.81 km^{2} (3.02 sq mi)

Population (2021)
  - Total: 6,204
  - Density: 794/km^{2} (2,060/sq mi)
- Time zone: CET

Beerzel (Dutch: [ˈbeːrzəl]) is a Belgian village in Antwerp Province and a deelgemeente of the municipality Putte. Beerzel was a municipality until 1977, at which time it had an area of 7.83 square kilometres (3.02 sq mi) with 4,971 inhabitants in 1995. At 51.6 metres (169 ft), Antwerp's highest point—the Beerzelberg—is located in Beerzel.

== History ==
Pottery from the early Bronze age had been discovered in Beerzel. The village was first mentioned as Barsale in 1151. Until the World War I, a large beech was located at the top of the Beerzelberg. Beerzel was an independent municipality until 1977 when it merged into Putte.

== Notable people ==
- Jos Huysmans (1941–2012), road bicycle racer.

== Gallery ==
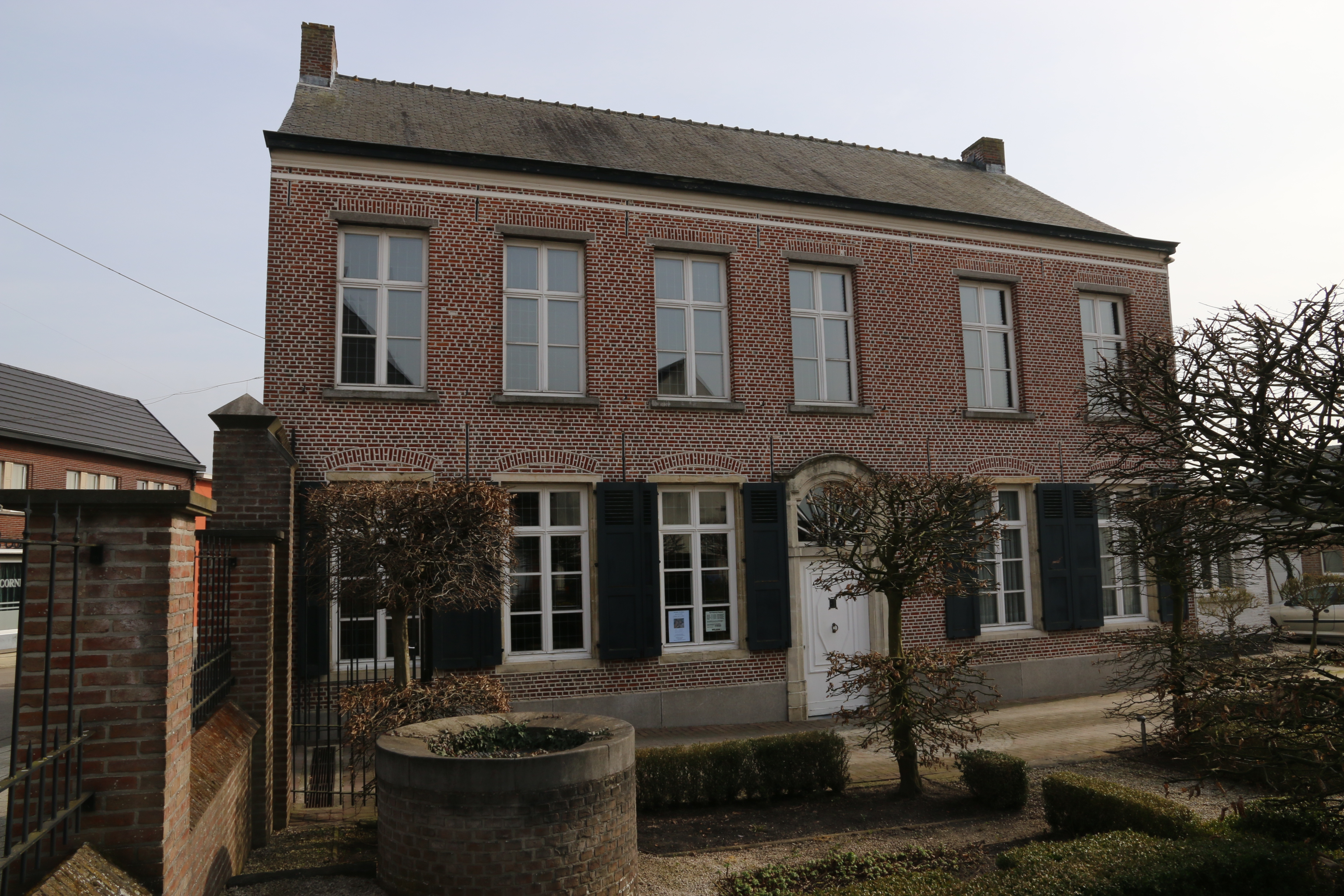
Clergy house

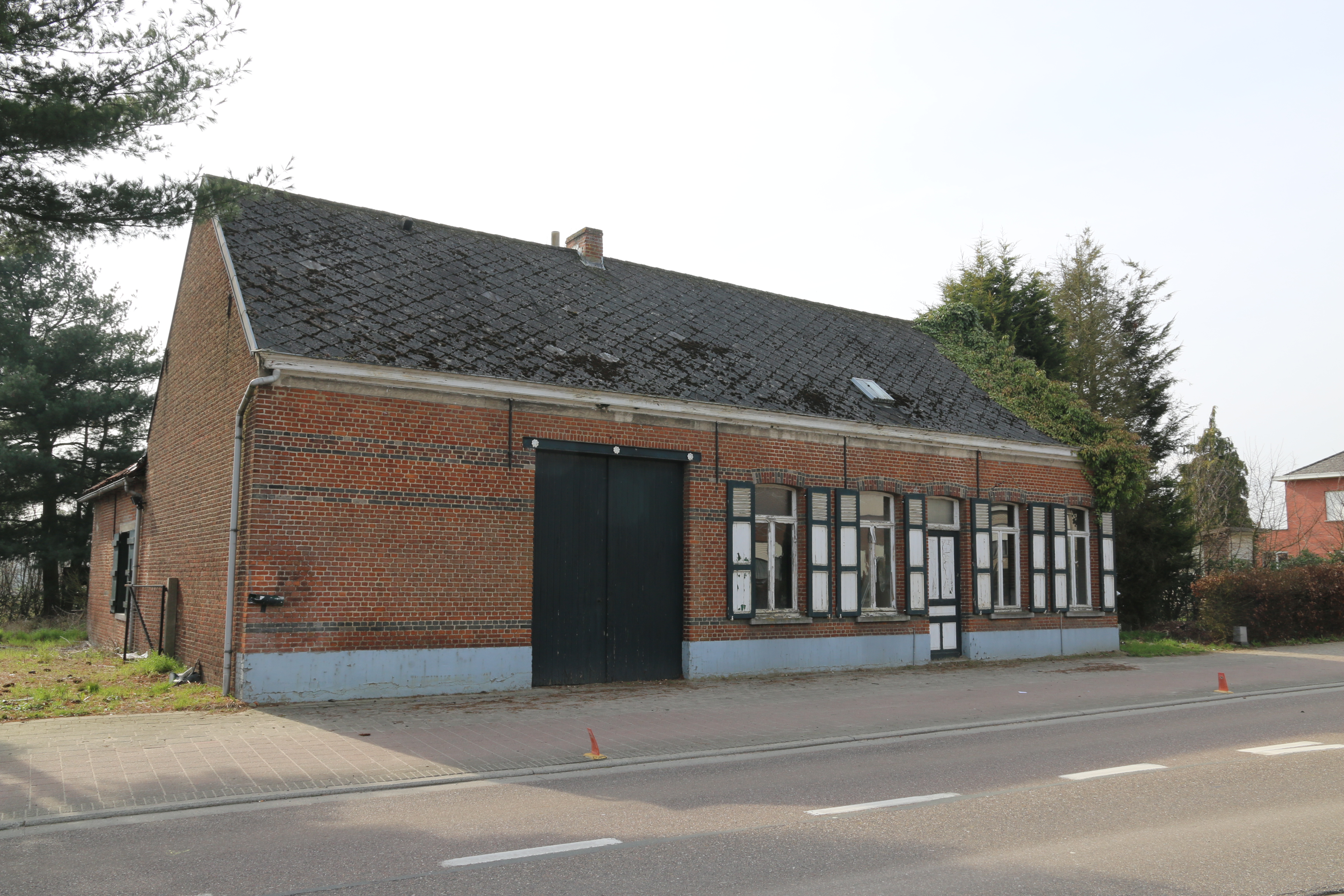
Farm in Beerzel

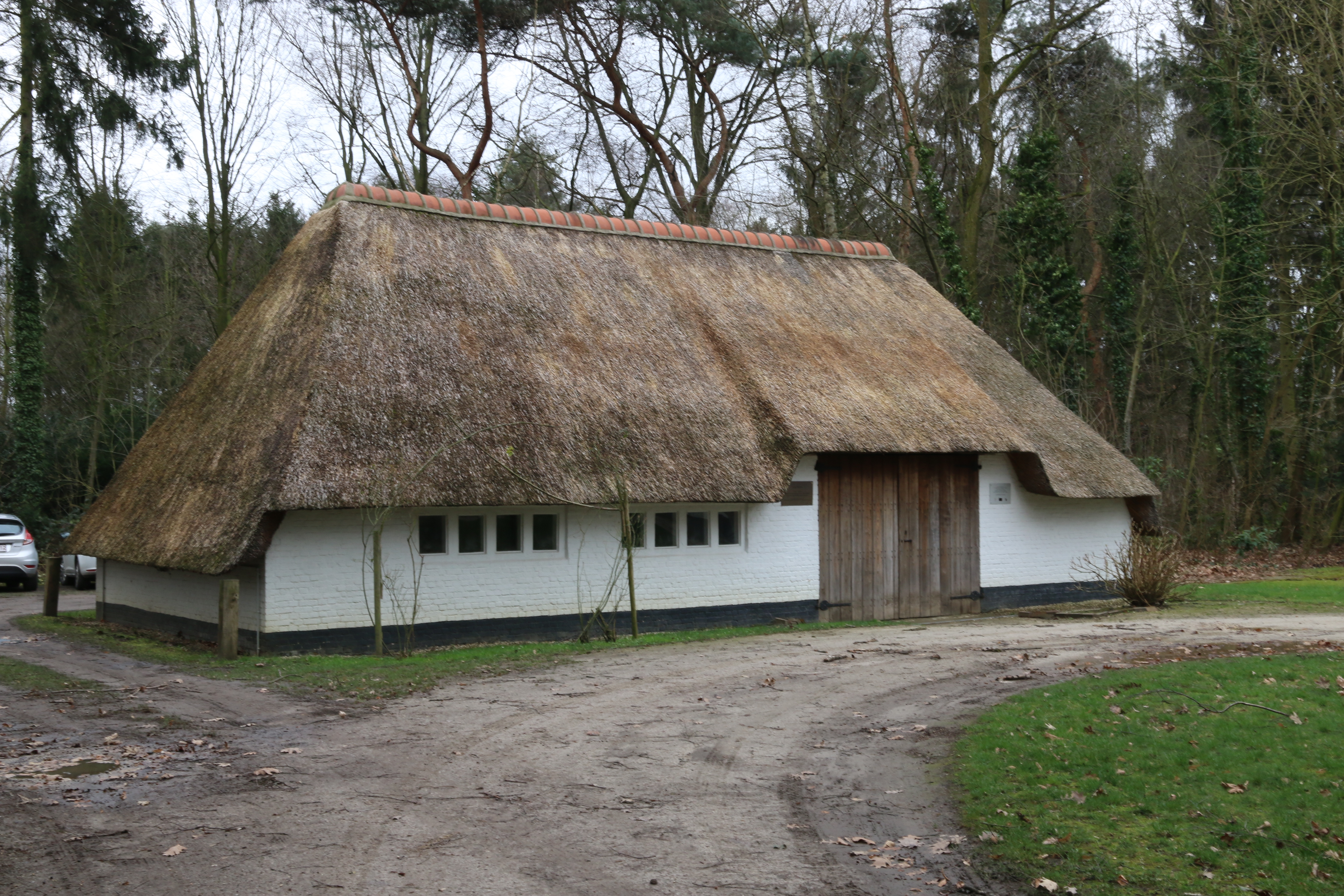
Barn Hof ter Speelbergen
