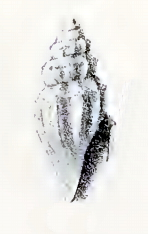
- Original image of a shell of Leiocithara apollinea

Scientific classification
- Kingdom: Animalia
- Phylum: Mollusca
- Class: Gastropoda
- Subclass: Caenogastropoda
- Order: Neogastropoda
- Superfamily: Conoidea
- Family: Mangeliidae
- Genus: Leiocithara
- Species: L. apollinea

Binomial name
- Leiocithara apollinea (Melvill, 1904)

Synonyms
- Bela apollinea (Melvill, 1904); Mangilia apollinea Melvill, 1904 (original combination)

= Leiocithara apollinea =

Species of gastropod

Leiocithara apollinea is a species of sea snail, a marine gastropod mollusk in the family Mangeliidae.

== Description ==
The length of the shell attains 5 mm, its diameter 1.75 mm.

This white shell is a scalate Leiocithara .It has an ovate fusiform shape and contains 5 whorls. It is principally conspicuous for its thickened longitudinal ribs, 9–10 in number on the body whorl. The interstices are quite smooth. One spiral keel alone, a little below the sutures, crosses the ribs at right angles, and at the point of junction bears a beaded point. The aperture is oblong and becomes narrower at its base. The outer lip is incrassate.

== Distribution ==
This species occurs in the Gulf of Oman.
