= Putt-Putt =

Putt-Putt may refer to:

- Putt-putt golf or miniature golf
- Putt-Putt (series), a children's adventure and puzzle computer game series
- Putt-Putt Fun Center, a chain of amusement centers and miniature golf courses
- Railroad speeder or putt-putt, a small motorized vehicle used on railroads
- Putt-putt, a test rocket used during Project Orion
- Putt-Putt, an auxiliary power unit aboard an aircraft
- Putt-Putt Bar & Grill, a location in the 2008 Belize mass shooting

== See also ==
- Putt (disambiguation)
