= Leiocithara =

Scientific classification
- Kingdom: Animalia
- Phylum: Mollusca
- Class: Gastropoda
- Subclass: Caenogastropoda
- Order: Neogastropoda
- Superfamily: Conoidea
- Family: Mangeliidae
- Genus: Leiocithara; Hedley, 1922

Type species
- Mangelia infulata Hedley, 1909

Species
- See text

Synonyms
- Eucithara porcellanea (Kilburn, 1992); Leiocythara [sic] (misspelling)

Genus of gastropods

Leiocithara is a genus of sea snails, marine gastropod mollusks in the family Mangeliidae.

Ch. Hedley originally proposed Leiocithara as a subgenus of Eucithara for a group of smooth shells having the contour of Eucithara, but without the characteristic grain sculpture.

== Species ==
Species within the genus Leiocithara include:

- Leiocithara angulata (Reeve, 1846)
- Leiocithara apollinea (Melvill, 1904)
- Leiocithara costellarioides Kilburn, 1992
- Leiocithara infulata (Hedley, 1909)
- Leiocithara lischkei (E. A. Smith, 1888)
- Leiocithara longispira (E. A. Smith, 1879)
- Leiocithara macrocephala (Thiele, 1925)
- Leiocithara musae (Thiele, 1925)
- Leiocithara opalina (E. A. Smith, 1882)
- Leiocithara perlucidula Kilburn, 1992
- Leiocithara porcellanea Kilburn, 1992
- Leiocithara potti (Sturany, 1900)
- Leiocithara translucens (Barnard, 1958)
- Leiocithara zamula Kilburn, 1992
