= Leiocithara perlucidula =

Scientific classification
- Kingdom: Animalia
- Phylum: Mollusca
- Class: Gastropoda
- Subclass: Caenogastropoda
- Order: Neogastropoda
- Superfamily: Conoidea
- Family: Mangeliidae
- Genus: Leiocithara
- Species: L. perlucidula

Binomial name
- Leiocithara perlucidula Kilburn, 1992

Species of gastropod

Leiocithara perlucidula is a species of sea snail, a marine gastropod mollusk in the family Mangeliidae.

== Description ==
The length of the shell attains 5 mm, its diameter is 2.3 mm.

== Distribution ==
This species occurs off Northern Zululand to Eastern Cape Province, South Africa, at depths between 40 m and 150 m.
