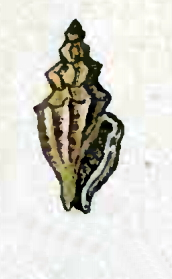
- Drawing of a shell of Leiocithara angulata

Scientific classification
- Kingdom: Animalia
- Phylum: Mollusca
- Class: Gastropoda
- Subclass: Caenogastropoda
- Order: Neogastropoda
- Superfamily: Conoidea
- Family: Mangeliidae
- Genus: Leiocithara
- Species: L. angulata

Binomial name
- Leiocithara angulata (Reeve, 1846)

Synonyms
- Cythara angulata Brazier, 1876; Eucithara angulata (Reeve, 1846); Mangelia angulata Reeve, 1846 (original combination)

= Leiocithara angulata =

Species of gastropod

Leiocithara angulata is a species of sea snail, a marine gastropod mollusc in the family Mangeliidae.

== Description ==
The length of the shell attains 5 mm.

The whorls are sharply angulated, with a few sharp narrow longitudinal ribs, crossing the shoulder to the suture, no revolving striae. The shell is yellowish brown, lineated with pale chestnut.

== Distribution ==
This marine species occurs off the Philippines and Queensland, Australia
