= Putten (disambiguation) =

Putten is a municipality in the province of Gelderland, Netherlands.

It can also refer to:

- Putten, a neighborhood in Eindhoven, Netherlands
- Putten Island, former island now part of Voorne-Putten, an island in South Holland, Netherlands
- Dutch surnames:
  - Van Putten
  - Van der Putten

== See also ==
- Putte (disambiguation)
