= Leiocithara opalina =

Scientific classification
- Kingdom: Animalia
- Phylum: Mollusca
- Class: Gastropoda
- Subclass: Caenogastropoda
- Order: Neogastropoda
- Superfamily: Conoidea
- Family: Mangeliidae
- Genus: Leiocithara
- Species: L. opalina

Binomial name
- Leiocithara opalina (E. A. Smith, 1882)

Synonyms
- Pleurotoma (Mangilia) opalina E.A. Smith, 1882

Species of gastropod

Leiocithara opalina is a species of sea snail, a marine gastropod mollusk in the family Mangeliidae.

== Description ==
The length of the shell attains 8 mm, its diameter 3 mm.

The ovate-fusiform shell has a pale reddish to white color. It contains 8 whorls, of which two convex, vitreous whorls in the protoconch. The subsequent whorls are slightly concave and subangulate in their middle. The longitudinal sculpture consists of 12 slightly arcuate ribs. The spiral lirae number six to seven, forming slight nodules when crossing the axials, but number 24 on the body whorl. The narrow aperture measures about half the total length of the shell. The outer lip is without teeth and has in the middle a small reddish spot and is slightly sinuate at the top. The columella shows a parietal nodule. The siphonal canal is short and narrow. The entire surface is finely reticulated by the wavy lines of growth and spiral striations; but these are not visible under an ordinary lens.

== Distribution ==
The type locality is unknown.

== Bibliography ==
- Kilburn R.N. 1992. Turridae (Mollusca: Gastropoda) of southern Africa and Mozambique. Part 6. Subfamily Mangeliinae, section 1. Annals of the Natal Museum, 33: 461–575
