= Leiocithara lischkei =

Scientific classification
- Kingdom: Animalia
- Phylum: Mollusca
- Class: Gastropoda
- Subclass: Caenogastropoda
- Order: Neogastropoda
- Superfamily: Conoidea
- Family: Mangeliidae
- Genus: Leiocithara
- Species: L. lischkei

Binomial name
- Leiocithara lischkei (E.A. Smith, 1888)

Synonyms
- Mangelia lischkei (E.A. Smith, 1888); Pleurotoma (Mangilia) lischkei E.A. Smith, 1888

Species of gastropod

Leiocithara lischkei is a species of sea snail, a marine gastropod mollusk in the family Mangeliidae.

== Description ==
The length of the shell attains 6.5 mm, its diameter 2.5 mm.

The ovate-fusiform shell is turreted. Its color is dark white with very indistinct spiral reddish lines, of which there appear to be three on the body whorl. The shell contains six whorls with a distinct peripheral angle as the result of the presence of a weakly developed peripheral cord. The protoconch is conical and contains 3.5 whorls. The longitudinal sculpture consists of twelve ribs. The spiral sculpture is almost obsolete. The aperture measures about half the total length of the shell. The outer lip is incrassate and slightly sinuate at the top. The short siphonal canal is narrow.

It is closely related to Leiocithara porcellanea Kilburn, 1992 from South Africa.

== Distribution ==
This species occurs in the seas off Japan.
