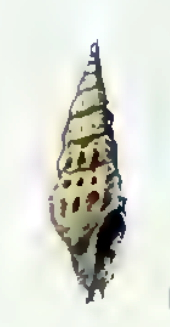
- Original image of a shell of Leiocithara longispira

Scientific classification
- Kingdom: Animalia
- Phylum: Mollusca
- Class: Gastropoda
- Subclass: Caenogastropoda
- Order: Neogastropoda
- Superfamily: Conoidea
- Family: Mangeliidae
- Genus: Leiocithara
- Species: L. longispira

Binomial name
- Leiocithara longispira (E. A. Smith, 1879)

Synonyms
- Drillia longispira E. A. Smith, 1879 (original combination)

= Leiocithara longispira =

Species of gastropod

Leiocithara longispira is a species of sea snail, a marine gastropod mollusk in the family Mangeliidae.

== Description ==
The length of the shell attains 16.5 mm, its diameter 4.5 mm.

(Original description) The slender shell has a fusiform shape. It is whitish, banded with brown between the ribs; zones two in number on the upper whorl—one a little below the upper suture, and the other at the base. The shell contains 10 whorls, the two first smooth, convex, the rest somewhat excavated above, obtusely angled at the middle, obliquely costate and spirally striated. There are about six ribs on a whorl, oblique, subnodose at the middle, attenuating at both extremities and not reaching to the upper suture. The transverse striae are rather coarse, minutely decussated by the flexuous lines of growth. The body whorl shows a third brown zone below the middle. The aperture is whitish within, ornamented with the three exterior bands, occupying about four elevenths of the entire length of the shell. The sinus is deep, situated in the upper part of the lip, which is thin, has a second shallow sinuation near the base, and is much produced and arcuate in outline in the middle. The columella is straightish, but a trifle oblique, covered with a thin callosity terminating in a tubercle at its junction with the upper extremity of the outer lip. The siphonal canal is short and recurved.

== Distribution ==
This species occurs off Japan.
