= Leiocithara costellarioides =

Scientific classification
- Kingdom: Animalia
- Phylum: Mollusca
- Class: Gastropoda
- Subclass: Caenogastropoda
- Order: Neogastropoda
- Superfamily: Conoidea
- Family: Mangeliidae
- Genus: Leiocithara
- Species: L. costellarioides

Binomial name
- Leiocithara costellarioides Kilburn, 1992

Species of gastropod

Leiocithara costellarioides is a species of sea snail, a marine gastropod mollusk in the family Mangeliidae.

== Description ==
The length of the shell attains 6 mm, its diameter 2.5 mm.

== Distribution ==
This species occurs in shallow waters off Northern Zululand to East Transkei, South Africa
