= Leiocithara zamula =

Scientific classification
- Kingdom: Animalia
- Phylum: Mollusca
- Class: Gastropoda
- Subclass: Caenogastropoda
- Order: Neogastropoda
- Superfamily: Conoidea
- Family: Mangeliidae
- Genus: Leiocithara
- Species: L. zamula

Binomial name
- Leiocithara zamula Kilburn, 1992

Species of gastropod

Leiocithara zamula is a species of sea snail, a marine gastropod mollusk in the family Mangeliidae.

== Description ==
The length of the shell attains 5.5 mm, its diameter 2.5 mm.

== Distribution ==
This species occurs off Transkei, South Africa, at depths between 160 m and 350 m.
