= Leiocithara porcellanea =

Scientific classification
- Kingdom: Animalia
- Phylum: Mollusca
- Class: Gastropoda
- Subclass: Caenogastropoda
- Order: Neogastropoda
- Superfamily: Conoidea
- Family: Mangeliidae
- Genus: Leiocithara
- Species: L. porcellanea

Binomial name
- Leiocithara porcellanea Kilburn, 1992

Species of gastropod

Leiocithara porcellanea is a species of sea snail, a marine gastropod mollusk in the family Mangeliidae.

== Description ==
The length of the shell attains 9.1 mm, its diameter 3.8 mm. It is closely related to Leiocithara lischkei (E. A. Smith, 1888) from Japan, but otherwise it displays shell characters of both Leiocithara and Citharomangelia.

== Distribution ==
This species occurs off Zululand, South Africa, at depths between 75 m and 160 m.
