= Van Petten =

Van Petten may refer to:

- Van Petten, Illinois, unincorporated community in the United States, named for A. G. Van Petten
- John B. Van Petten (1827-1908), American educator, general and politician
