= Puti =

Puti may refer to:

- Puti (title), an Indonesian title of nobility denoting Minangkabau origin
- Puti (film), a Filipino psychological thriller
- Puti Kaisar-Mihara, Austrian model of Minangkabau descent
- Puti Tipene Watene, New Zealand politician
- Puti (पुती), a vulgar term in Nepali that refers to the vagina.

== See also ==
- Bodhi Tree
- Putti (disambiguation)
