= Woensdrecht =

- Municipality
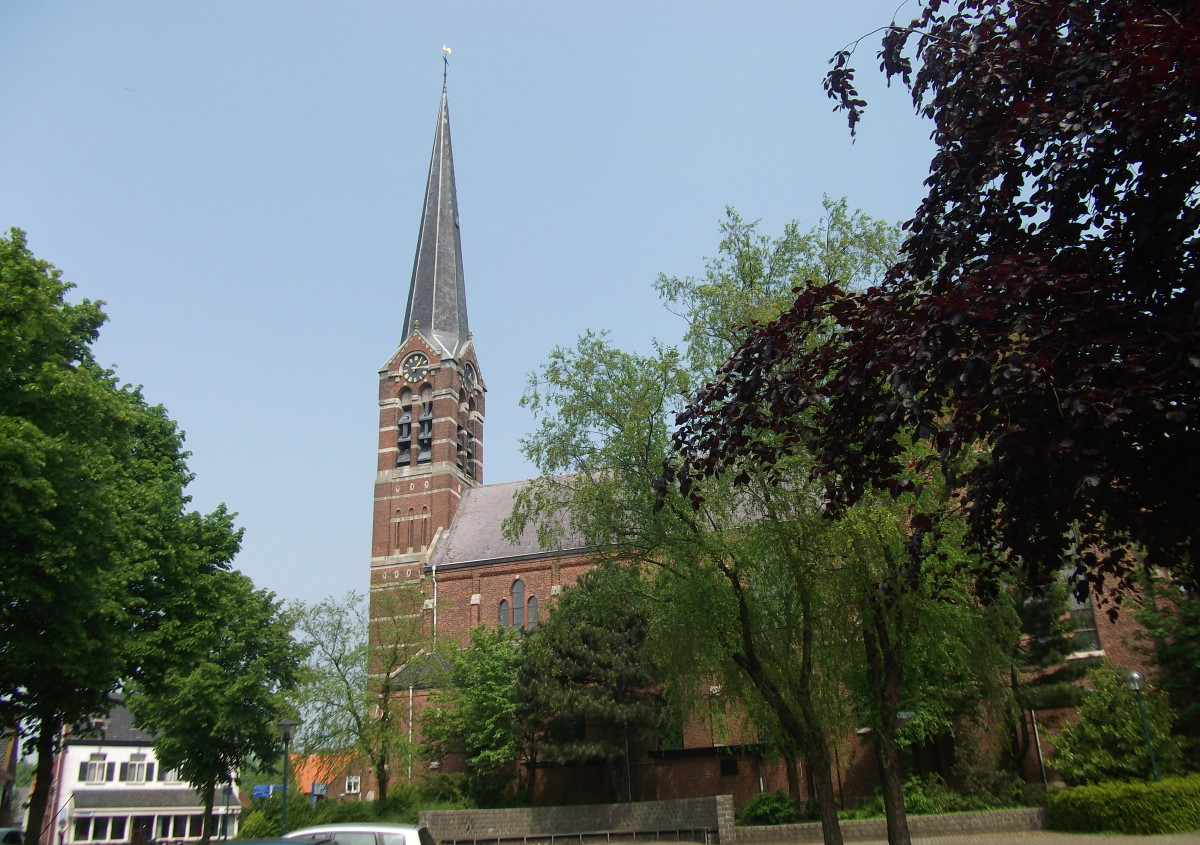
- Sint Gertrudiskerk, Ossendrecht

- Flag Coat of arms

- Location in North Brabant
- Coordinates: 51°25′N 4°20′E
- Country: Netherlands
- Province: North Brabant

Government
  - Body: Municipal council
  - Mayor: Steven Adriaansen (VVD)

Area
  - Total: 91.97 km^{2} (35.51 sq mi)
  - Land: 91.66 km^{2} (35.39 sq mi)
  - Water: 0.31 km^{2} (0.12 sq mi)
- Elevation: 24 m (79 ft)

Population (January 2021)
  - Total: 22,028
  - Density: 240/km^{2} (620/sq mi)
- Demonym: Woensdrechter
- Time zone: UTC+1 (CET)
  - Summer (DST): UTC+2 (CEST)
- Postcode: 4630–4645
- Area code: 0164
- Website: www.woensdrecht.nl

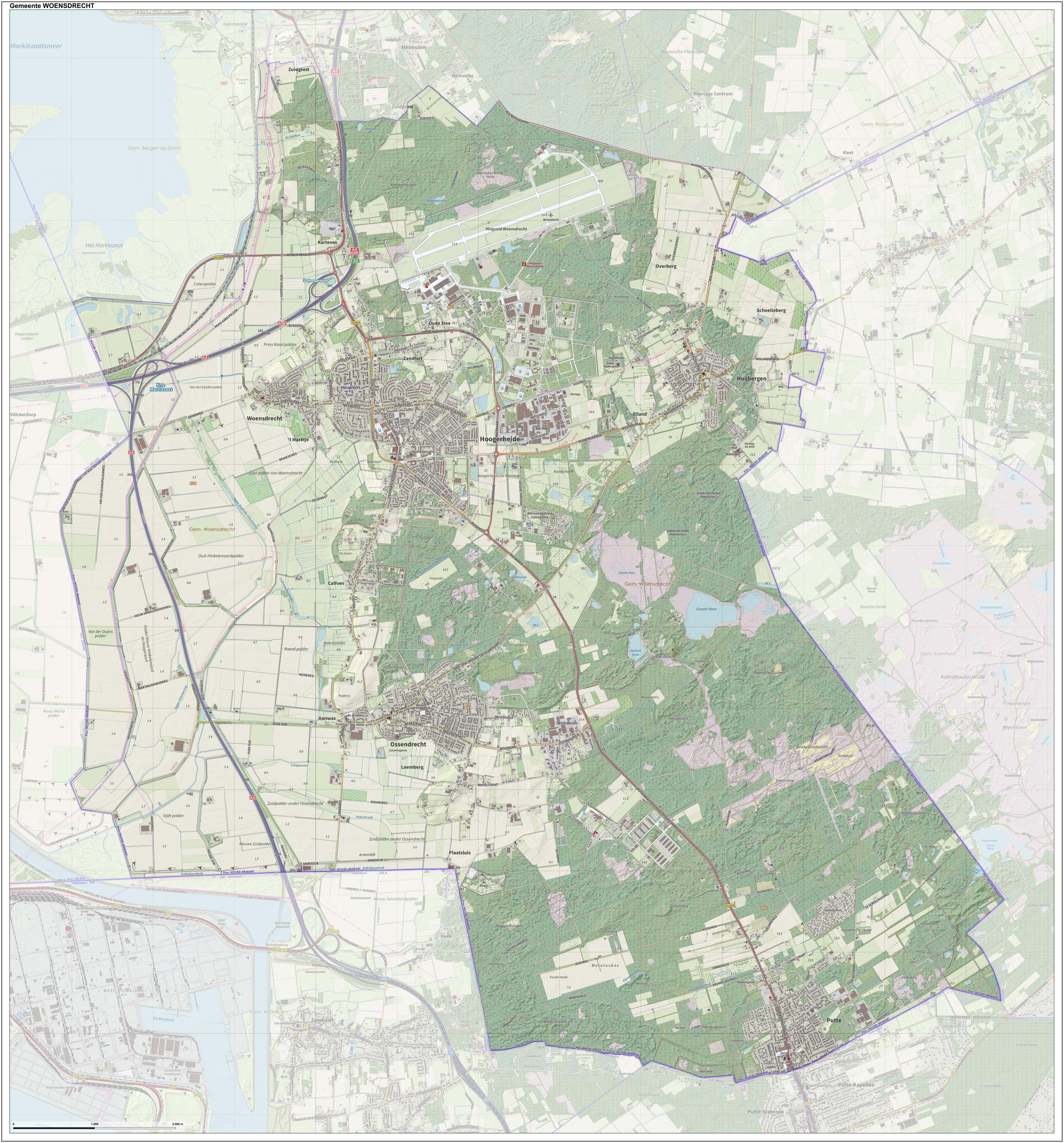
Dutch Topographic map of Woensdrecht, June 2015

Woensdrecht (Dutch pronunciation: [ˈʋunzdrɛxt]) is a municipality (named after the village) in the southern Netherlands.

Woensdrecht is the home of the Woensdrecht Air Base, which is located to the north-east of the village of Woensdrecht and to the north-west of Huijbergen.

== History ==
=== Second World War ===
On 2 October 1944, at the beginning of the Battle of the Scheldt (2 October-8 November 1944), the Canadian 2nd Division began its advance north from Antwerp. Stiff fighting at Woensdrecht ensued on 6 October, the objective of the first phase. The Germans, reinforced by Battle Group Chill, saw the priority in holding there, controlling direct access to South Beveland and Walcheren Island. There were heavy casualties as the Canadians attacked over open, flooded land. Driving rain, booby traps and land mines made the advance very difficult. On 13 October, what would come to be known as "Black Friday", the Canadian 5th Infantry Brigade's Black Watch was virtually wiped out in an unsuccessful attack. The Calgary Highlanders were to follow up with a more successful action, and their Carrier Platoon succeeded in taking the rail station at Korteven. Heavy fighting at Hoogerheide also ensued, but by 16 October, Woensdrecht was secured, cutting the land link to South Beveland and Walcheren. The Canadians were successful in completing their objective.

After that the Buffaloes, ground forces dedicating to causing as much impact to the enemy troops during the barrage, secured the Breskens pocket on the north side of the Scheldt river.

=== Cold War era ===
In 1983, it was decided that the United States would station 48 nuclear armed cruise missiles at the air base in the district, unless the USSR reduced their number of SS-20 missiles to 378. Since the number was still higher in 1985, stationing was to proceed. Among the Dutch population there was protest against this. The plan was cancelled in 1987 due to the Intermediate-Range Nuclear Forces Treaty.

== Population centres ==
- Hoogerheide (population: 8,268)
- Ossendrecht (5,300)
- Putte (3,860)
- Huijbergen (2,180)
- Woensdrecht (village) (1,470)

== Climate ==
The climate in this area has mild differences between highs and lows, and there is adequate rainfall year-round. According to the Köppen Climate Classification system, Woensdrecht has a marine west coast climate, abbreviated "Cfb" on climate maps.

== Notable people ==
- René Pijnen (born 1946) former racing cyclist, Olympic champion in the 100 km team time-trial in the 1968 Summer Olympics
- Adri van der Poel (born 1959) retired Dutch cyclist
- Demi de Jong (born 1995) road cyclist

== Gallery ==
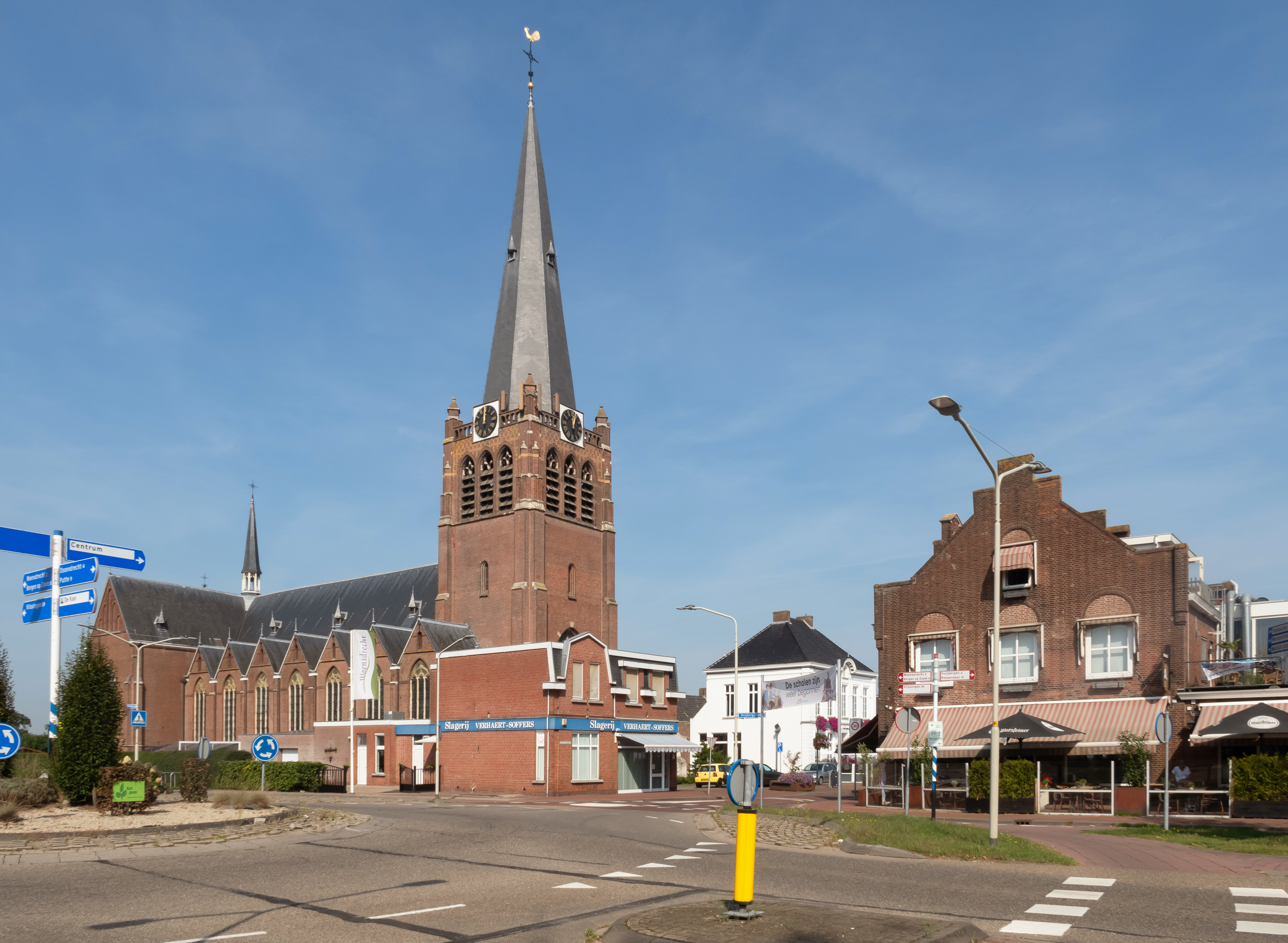
Hoogerheide, de Onze Lieve Vrouw Hemelvaartkerk

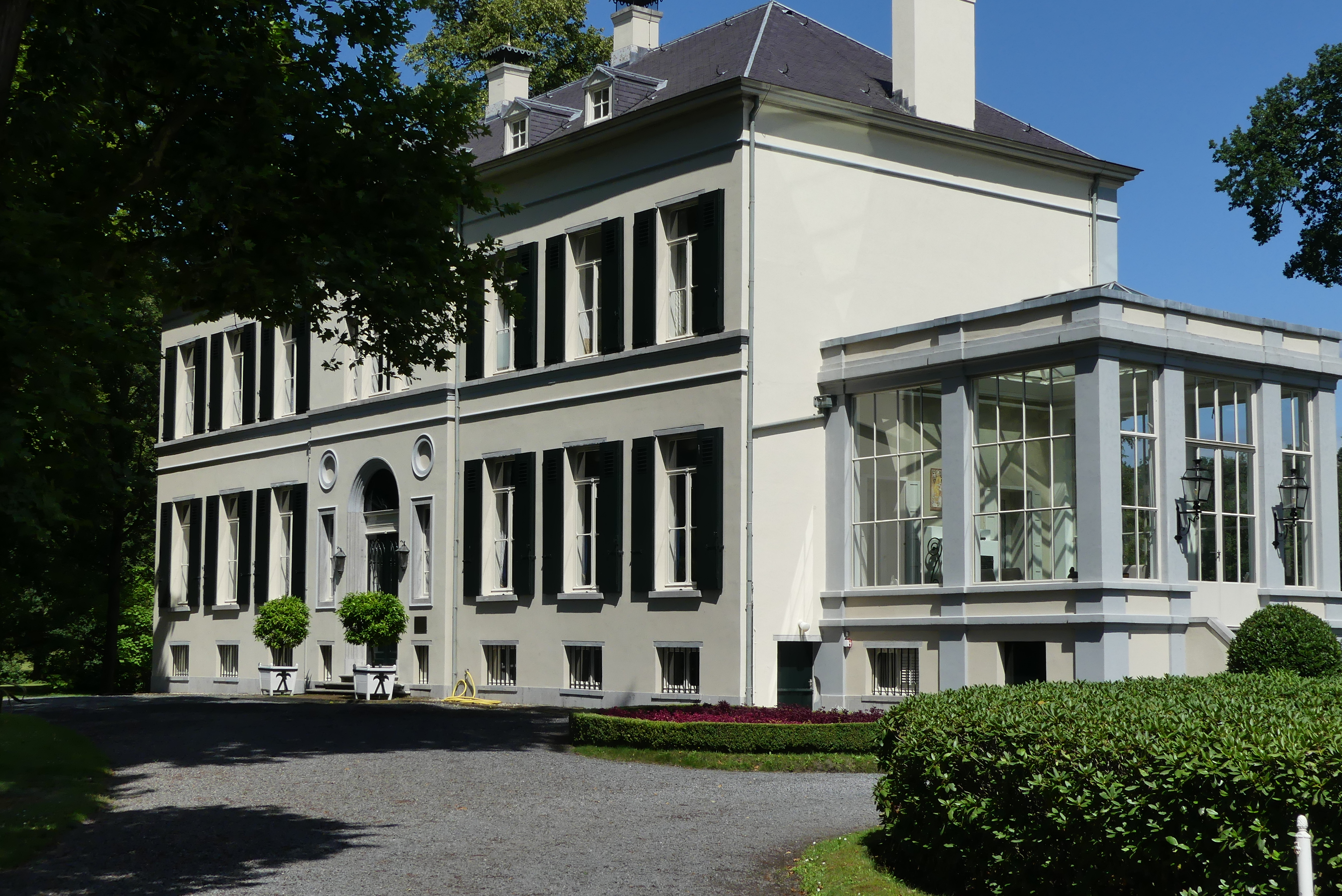
Mattemburgh

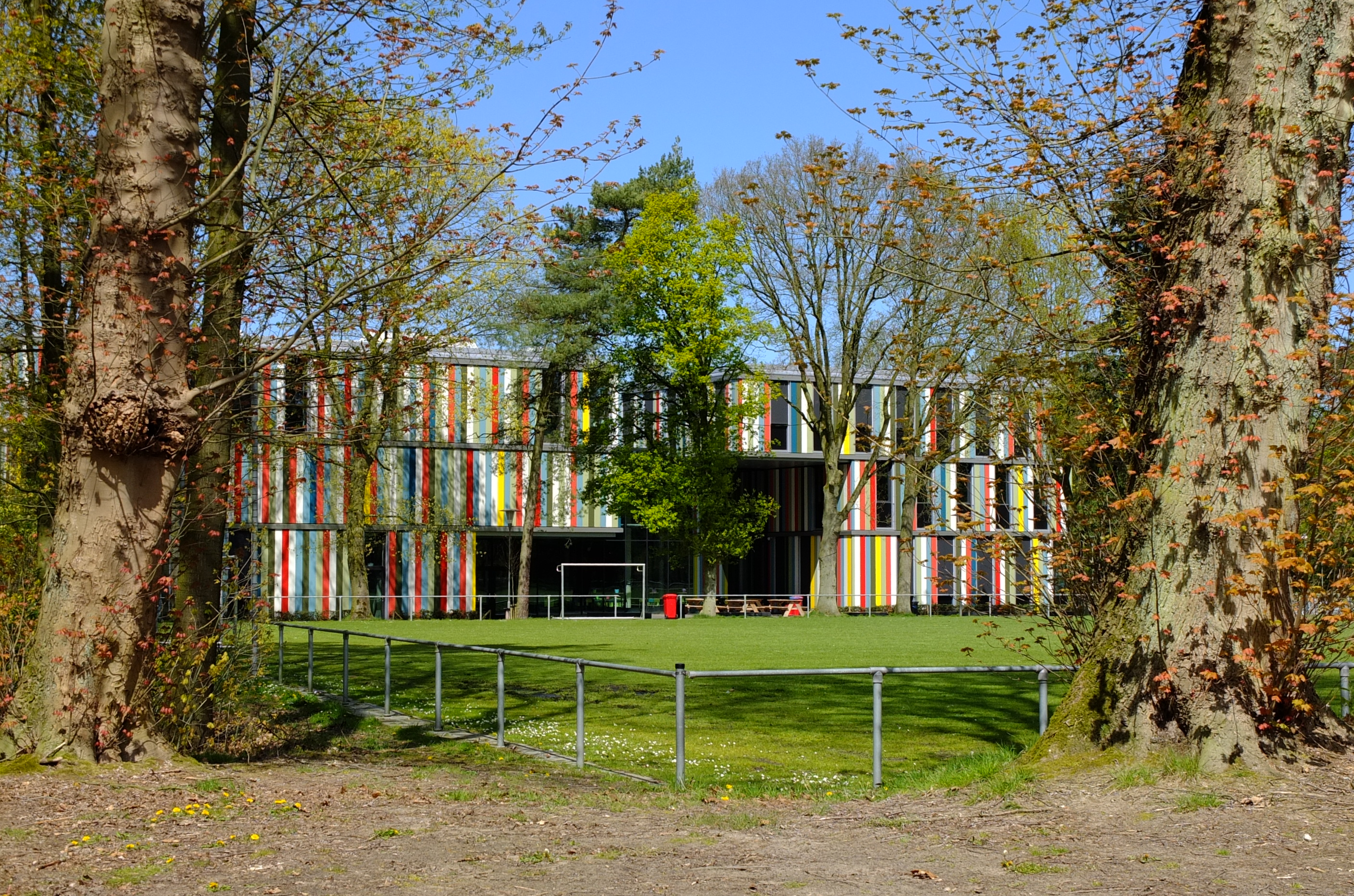
Ossendrecht

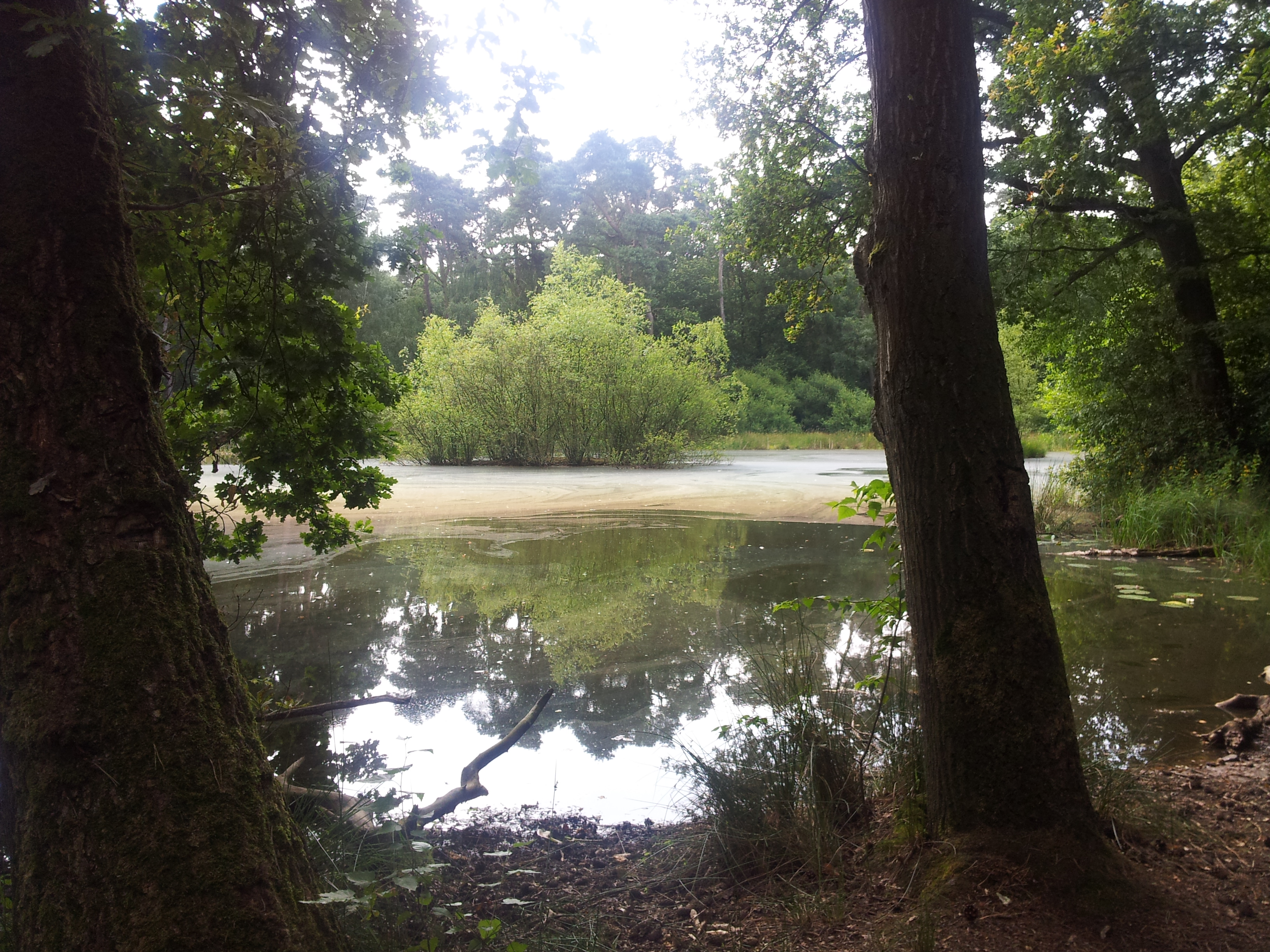
Meeven
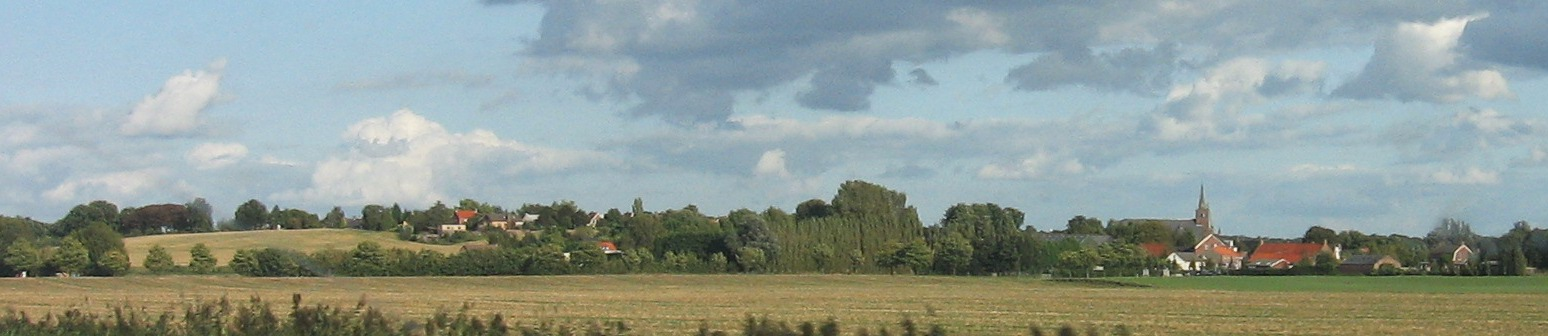
Brabantse Wal - Woensdrecht
