= Putti (disambiguation) =

Putti (singular putto) are chubby male infants in classical painting.

Putti may also refer to:

- Putti, Uganda, village in Pallisa District
- Lya De Putti (1897–1931) Hungarian film actress

== See also ==
- Putti Plutti Pott and Santa's Beard, Norwegian children's musical in which Putti Plutti Pott is Santa's grandson
- Puti (disambiguation)
- Putte (disambiguation)
- Puttee, strip of cloth wrapped around the lower leg
- Putty (disambiguation)
