= Huijbergen =

- Village
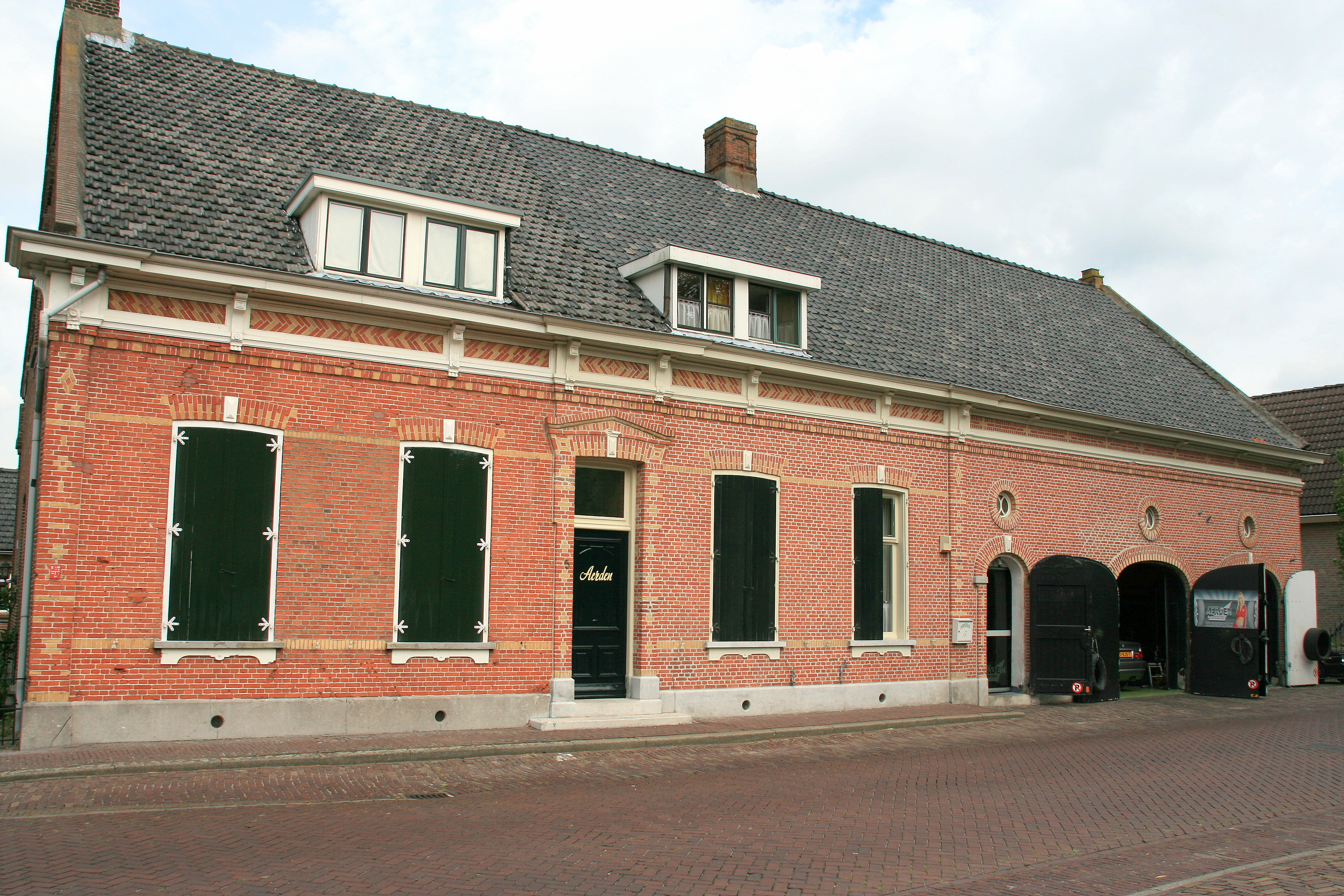
- Former brewery

- Coat of arms

- Location in the province of North Brabant in the Netherlands Huijbergen (Netherlands)
- Coordinates: 51°25′N 4°22′E
- Country: Netherlands
- Province: North Brabant
- Municipality: Woensdrecht

Area
  - Total: 10.37 km^{2} (4.00 sq mi)
- Elevation: 20 m (66 ft)

Population (2021)
  - Total: 1,930
  - Density: 186/km^{2} (482/sq mi)
- Time zone: UTC+1 (CET)
  - Summer (DST): UTC+2 (CEST)
- Postal code: 4635
- Dialing code: 0164

Huijbergen is a village in the Dutch province of North Brabant. It is located in the municipality of Woensdrecht, about 9 kilometres (5.6 mi) southeast of Bergen op Zoom, close to the Belgian border.

== History ==
The village was first mentioned in 1264 as in Huybergen. The etymology is unclear. In 1264, Hendrik V van Schoten, Lord of Breda, sold the moorland around Huijbergen for cultivation. The village developed in 1278 around the monastery of the Hermits of Saint William.

Only the gate wing of the monastery from the early-17th century remains. In 1847, an orphanage by the Brothers of Our Lady was established at the site. The building were severely damaged in 1944, and rebuilt in the 1950s in traditional style.

The grist mill Johanna was built in 1862. In 1918, the miller was struck by lightning and died several month later. It was already a ruin in the 1940s. In 1966, it was sold to the municipality, and restored between 1967 and 1969.

Huijbergen was home to 507 people in 1840. The village was severely damaged by war in 1944. Huijbergen was a separate municipality until 1997, when it became a part of Woensdrecht. In 2012, it held the national cyclo-cross championships, which was won by Lars Boom.

== Notable people ==
- Maria Hertogh, lived in Huijbergen from 2004 until her death in 2009.

== Gallery ==
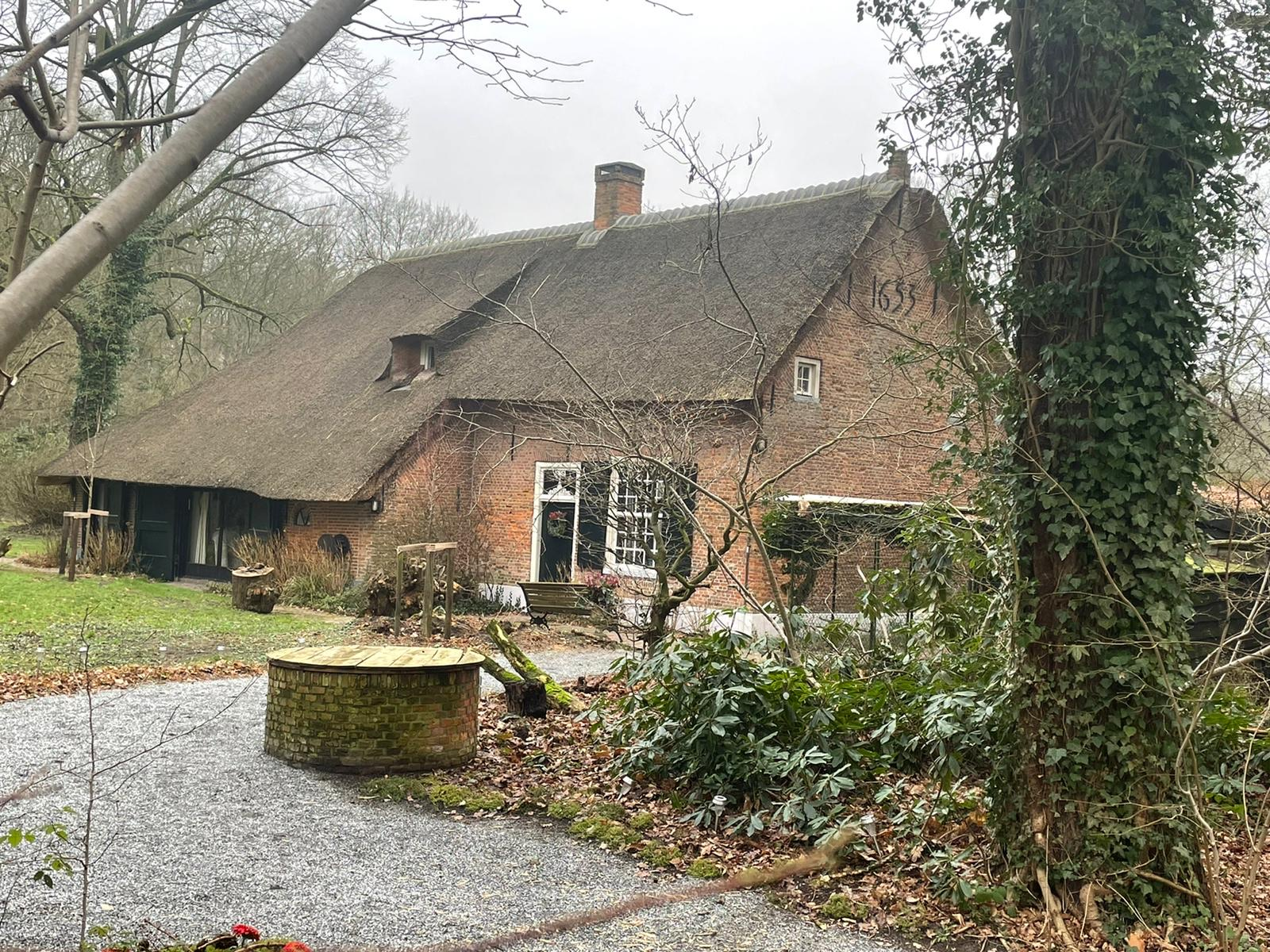
Farm in Huijbergen

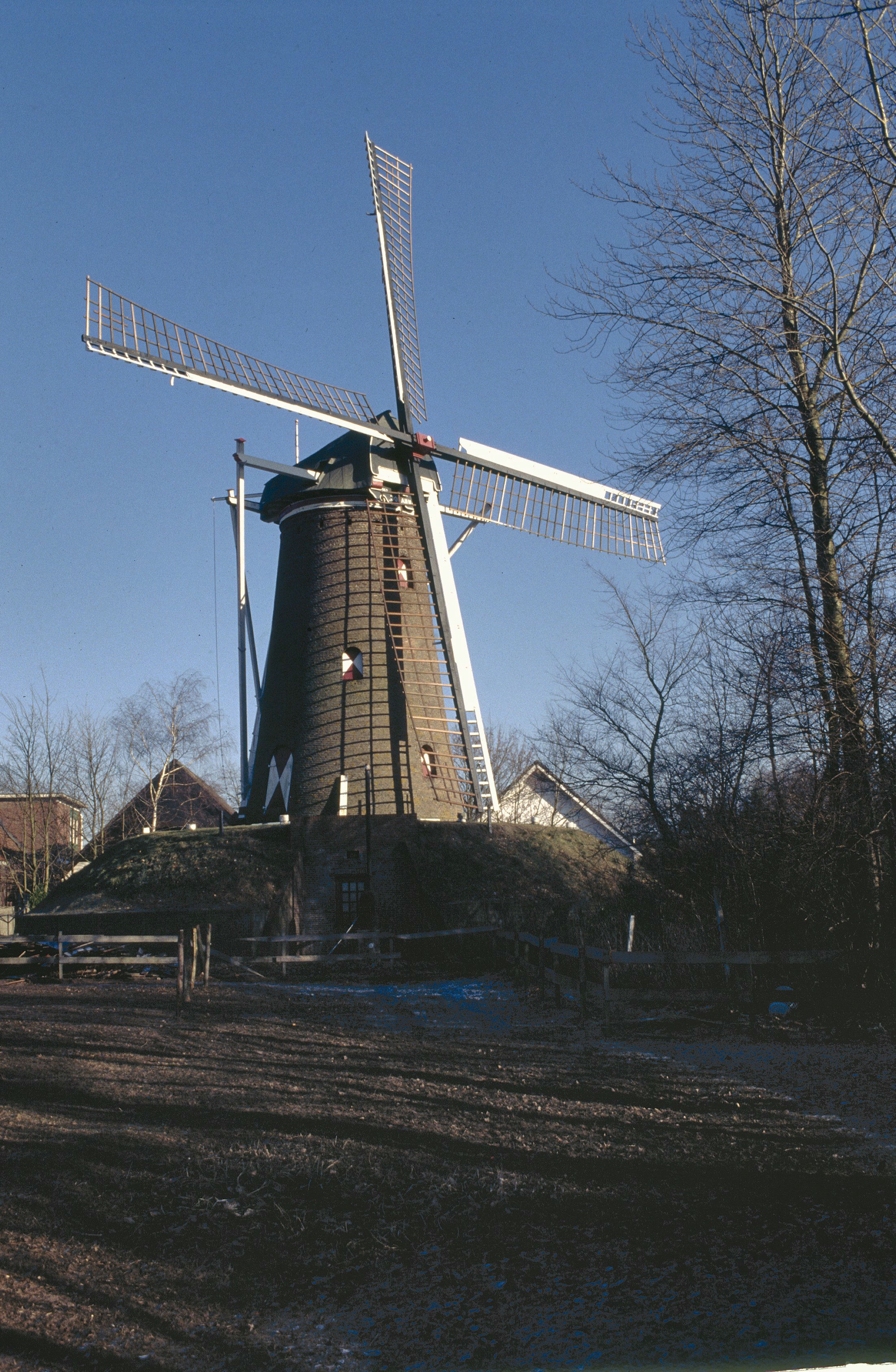
Wind mill Johanna
