= Leiocithara potti =

- Original image of a shell of Leiocithara potti

Scientific classification
- Kingdom: Animalia
- Phylum: Mollusca
- Class: Gastropoda
- Subclass: Caenogastropoda
- Order: Neogastropoda
- Superfamily: Conoidea
- Family: Mangeliidae
- Genus: Leiocithara
- Species: L. potti

Binomial name
- Leiocithara potti (Sturany, 1900)

Synonyms
- Pleurotoma (Drillia) potti Sturany, 1900 (basionym); Pleurotoma potti Sturany, 1900 (original combination)

Species of gastropod

Leiocithara potti is a species of sea snail, a marine gastropod mollusk in the family Mangeliidae.

== Description ==
The length of the shell attains 12.4 mm, its diameter 4.3 mm. The length of the aperture measures 6.0 mm; its diameter 2.2 mm.

(Original description in German) The shell is spindle-shaped and composed of nearly eight whorls. It is colored a yellowish-brown and retains faint traces of approximately six to seven brown spiral bands, which are only clearly visible on the swelling just before the aperture. The initial whorls are smooth, shining, and rounded, while the remaining whorls are equipped with nine to ten strong, obliquely set, and angled transverse folds; these give the entire whorl a distinctly angular appearance.

On the body whorl, the number of primary transverse folds reduces to eight, and several indistinct secondary folds are interspersed between them. Situated immediately before the aperture is a massive, rib-like thickening that runs all the way from the suture to the base. The spiral sculpture is only hinted at at the base of the body whorl, appearing as lines that run obliquely across the stalk-shaped canal. The aperture is elongated and features a slightly recurved siphonal canal, a sharp outer edge that is lipped with white on the interior, and a rounded notch.

== Distribution ==
This species occurs in the Red Sea and off Eritrea.
