= Sir Thomas Putt, 1st Baronet =

English Baronet

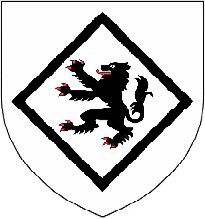
Putt arms: Argent, a lion rampant within a mascle sable

Sir Thomas Putt, 1st Baronet (1644–1686), of Combe, Gittisham, Devon, was an English politician.

He was a Member (MP) of the Parliament of England for Honiton in March 1679, October 1679, 1681, 16 April – 15 June 1685 and 3 October 1685 – 25 June 1686. He was Mayor of Honiton in 1685. He was succeeded by Sir Thomas Putt, 2nd Baronet.

Baronetage of England
New creation	Baronet (of Combe); 1666–1686	Succeeded by Thomas Putt
