= Van De Putte =

Van De Putte, Van de Putte, Vandeputte, or Van der Putte is a surname meaning "from Putte".

Notable people with the surname include:

- Fabrice Vandeputte (born 1969), French football manager and former player
- Isaäc Dignus Fransen van de Putte (1822–1902), Dutch politician
- Leticia R. Van de Putte (born 1954), American politician
- Lorca Van De Putte (born 1988), Belgian footballer
- Robert Vandeputte, Belgian economist, civil servant and politician
- Samuel van de Putte (1690–1745), Dutch explorer
- Jari Vandeputte (born 1996), Belgian footballer

== See also ==
- Van der Putten - surname
- Putte (disambiguation)
