= Putte, Kapellen =

Putte
- Village
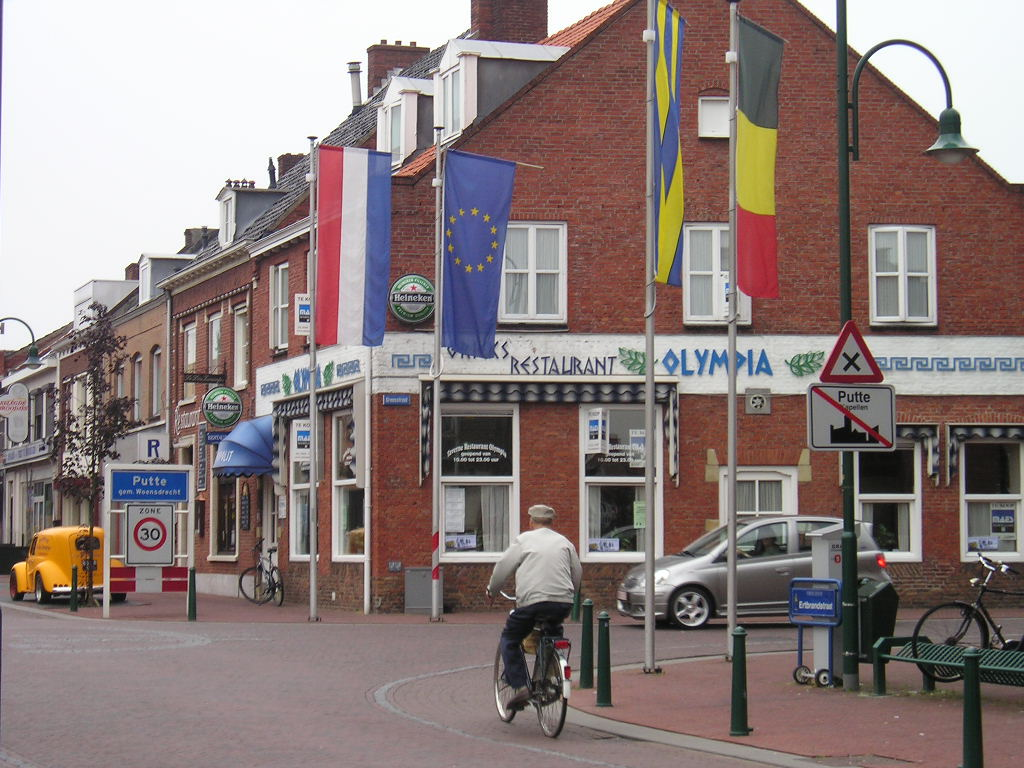
- The border between Belgium and the Netherlands in Putte.

- Location in Belgium
- Coordinates: 51°21′02″N 4°23′52″E
- Country: Belgium
- Region: Flemish Region
- Province: Antwerp
- Municipality: Kapellen

Area
  - Total: 5.81 km^{2} (2.24 sq mi)

Population (2021)
  - Total: 3,833
  - Density: 660/km^{2} (1,710/sq mi)
- Time zone: CET

Putte is a village on the border between Belgium and the Netherlands.

The village is marked by the borders that run through it. The Dutch part is in Woensdrecht, North Brabant. The Belgian part is mostly the municipality of Kapellen and a small part in the municipality of Stabroek, both are in the province of Antwerp.

The Nationale Sluitingsprijs, the last road bicycle racing of the season, is held in Putte.

== History ==
The village became the property of the Duke of Hoogstraten in 1714. In 1828, the village was divided into a Dutch and Belgian part. The main part of the village is on the Belgian side. The population of the village in 2007 was 3,464 people.

== Gallery ==
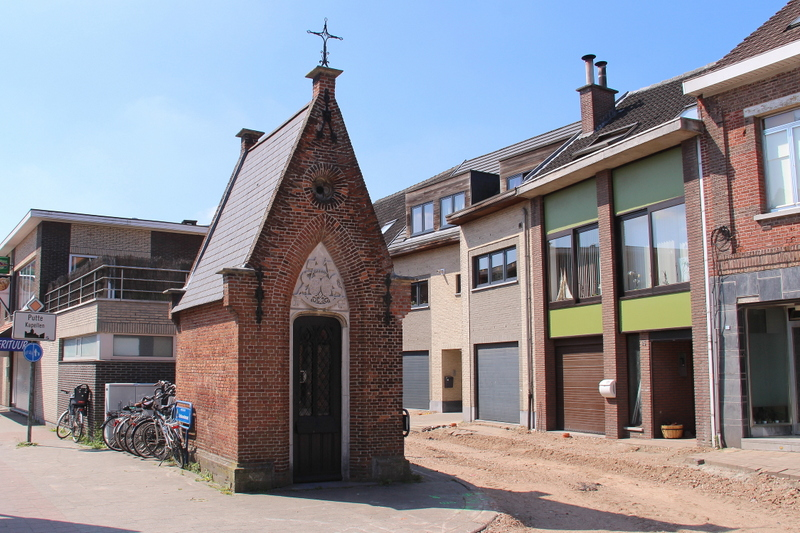
Chapel in Putte

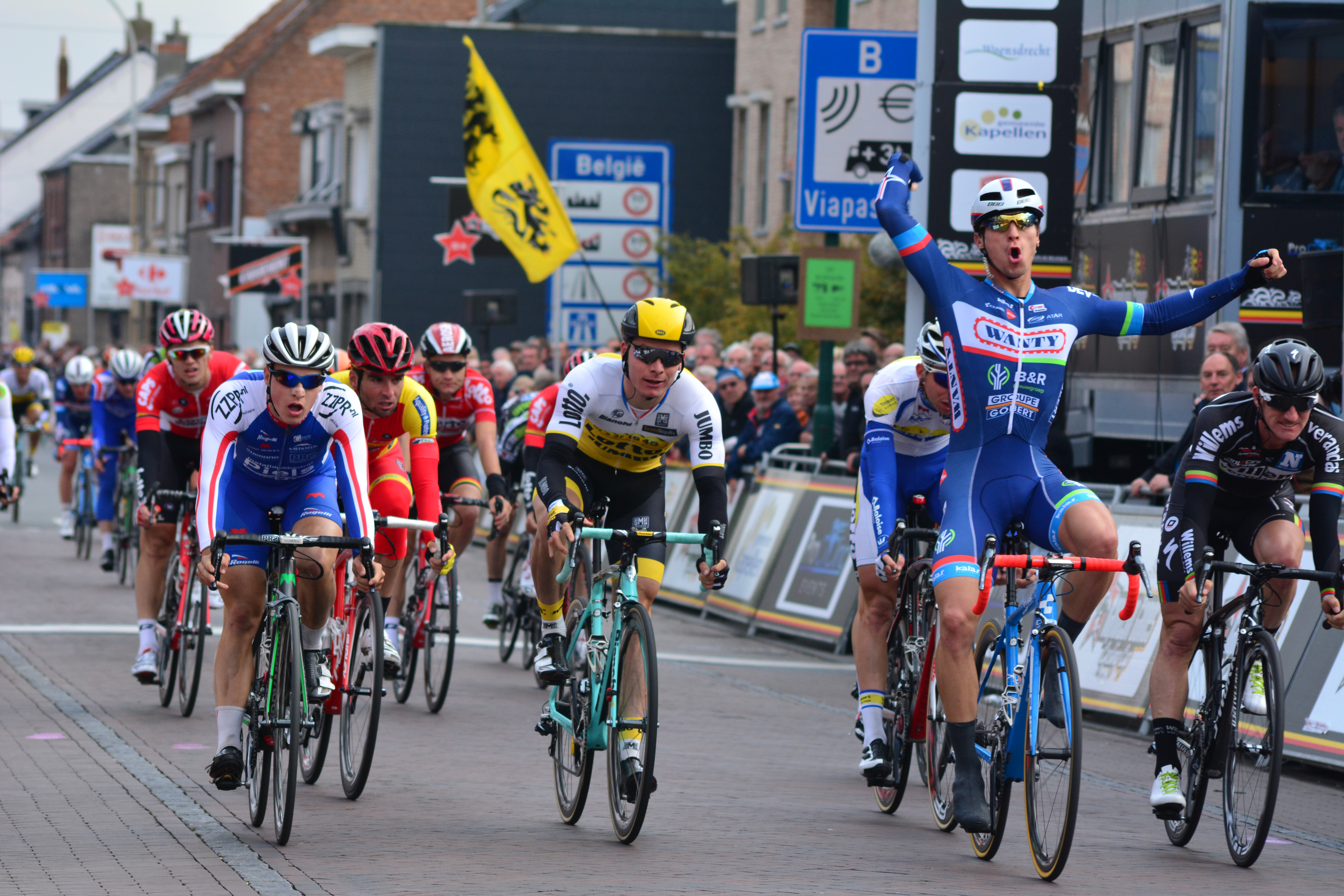
Nationale Sluitingsprijs 2016

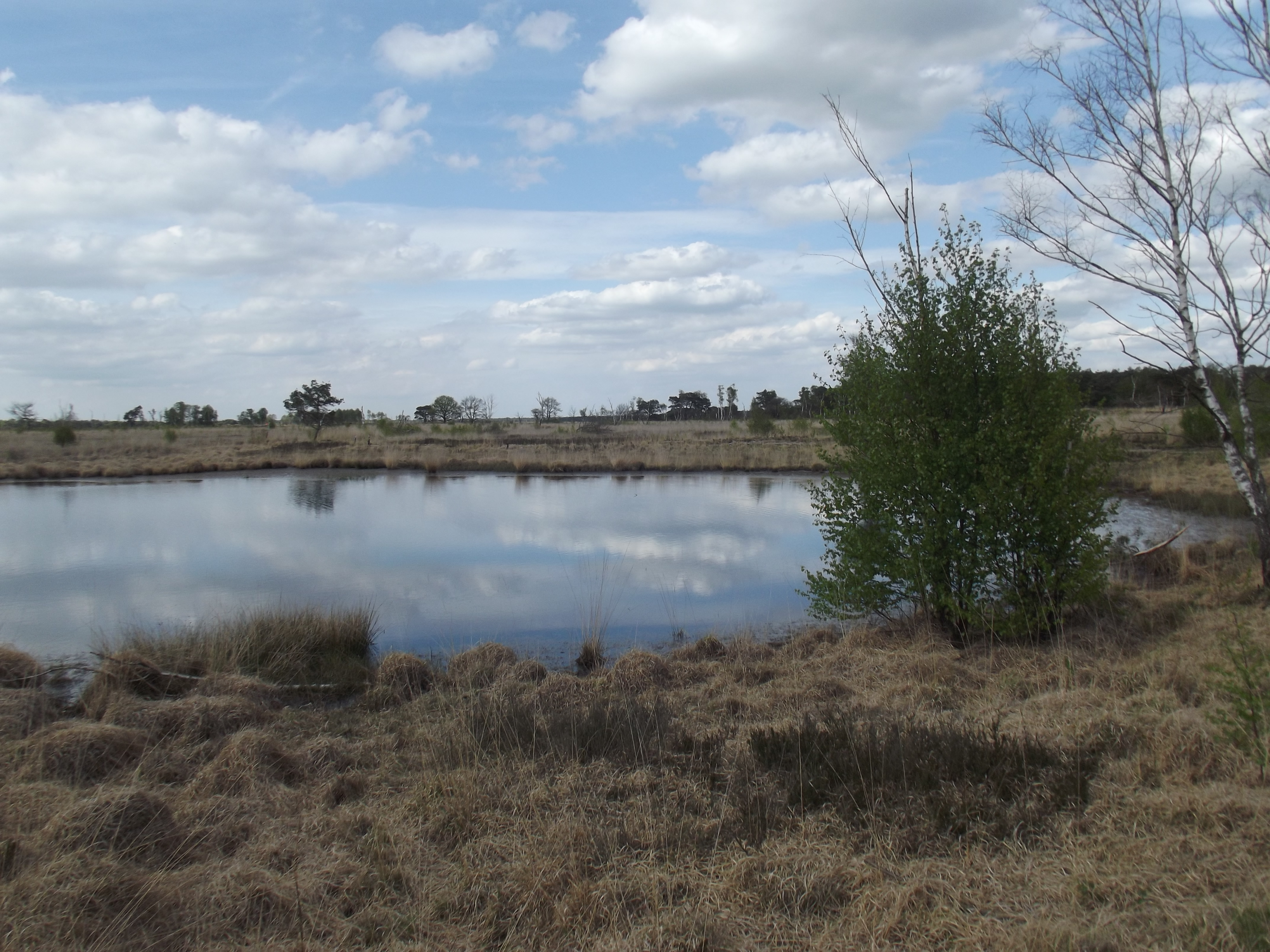
Nature area Putse Moer

== See also ==
- Putte, Netherlands
