= Putt baronets =

Extinct baronetcy in the Baronetage of England

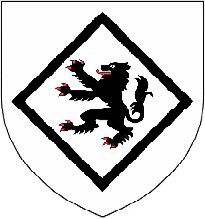
Putt arms: Argent, a lion rampant within a mascle sable

The Putt Baronetcy, of Combe in the County of Devon, was a title in the Baronetage of England. It was created on 20 July 1666 for Thomas Putt, of Combe, Gittisham, Devon, later member of parliament for Honiton. The title became extinct on the death of the second baronet in 1721.

== Putt baronets, of Combe (1666) ==
- Sir Thomas Putt, 1st Baronet (1644–1686)
- Sir Thomas Putt, 2nd Baronet (c. 1675–1721)
