= Hoogerheide =

- Village
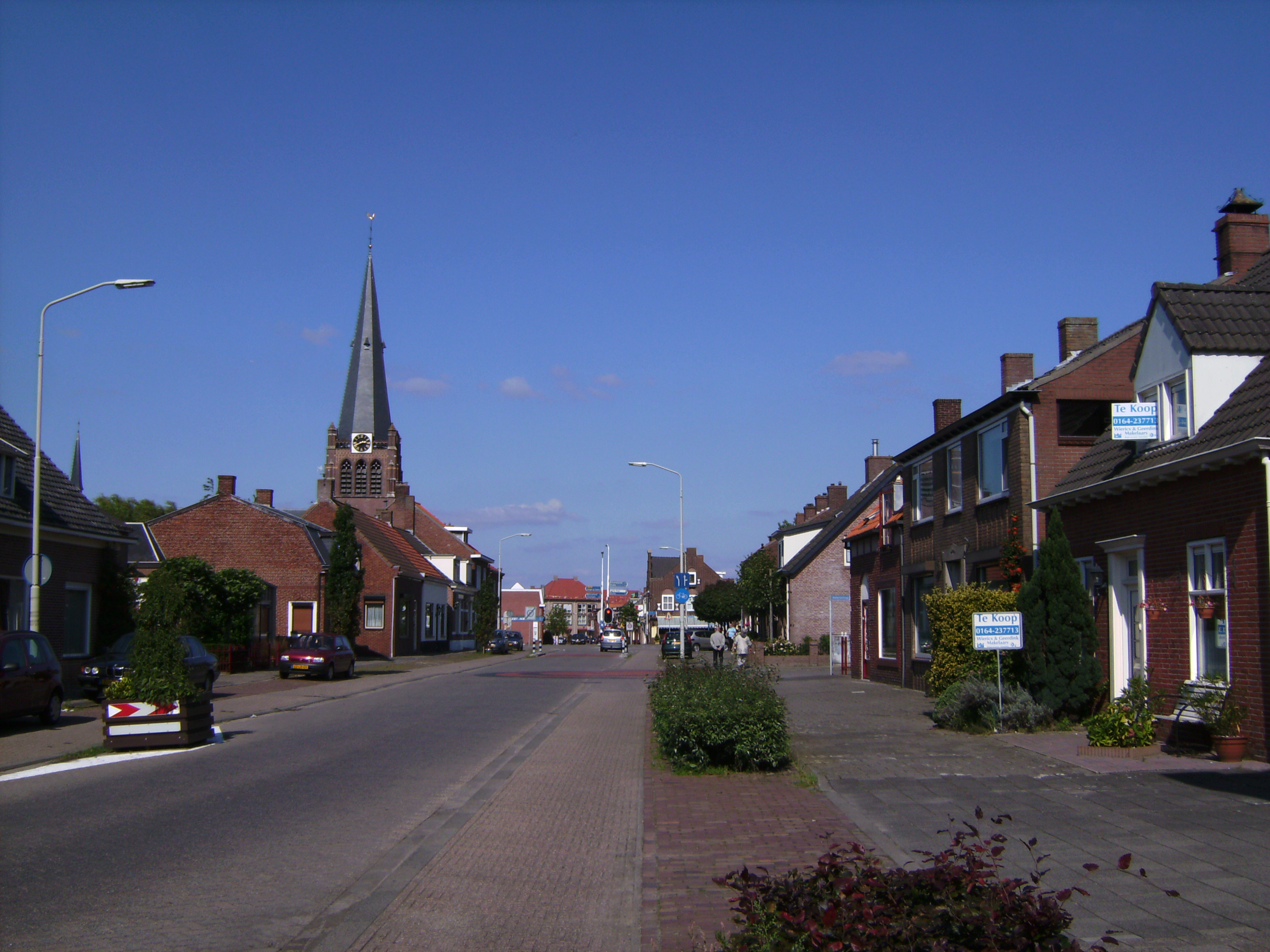
- Center of the village

- Location in the province of North Brabant in the Netherlands Hoogerheide (Netherlands)
- Coordinates: 51°25′3″N 4°19′26″E
- Country: Netherlands
- Province: North Brabant
- Municipality: Woensdrecht

Area
  - Total: 16.33 km^{2} (6.31 sq mi)
- Elevation: 16 m (52 ft)

Population (2021)
  - Total: 6,190
  - Density: 379/km^{2} (982/sq mi)
- Time zone: UTC+1 (CET)
  - Summer (DST): UTC+2 (CEST)
- Postal code: 4631
- Dialing code: 0164

Hoogerheide is a village in the municipality of Woensdrecht, North Brabant, Netherlands. The name "Hoogerheide" means "High Heath" in English. The Grand Prix Adri van der Poel cyclo-cross race is held annually in Hoogerheide.

The village was first mentioned in 1319 as "die hoeghe heide". Hooger (higher) has been added to distinguish from Nederheide. Hoogerheide developed after the Reformation around a clandestine church.

The Assumption of Mary Church was built in 1882 in Gothic Revival style. It was expanded in 1910. Mattenburgh is an estate to the north of the village. It is located on both sides of the Bergen op Zoom to Woensdrecht road.

Hoogerheide was home to 235 people in 1840. During the 20th century, Woensdrecht and Hoogerheide merged into a single urban area.

== Gallery ==
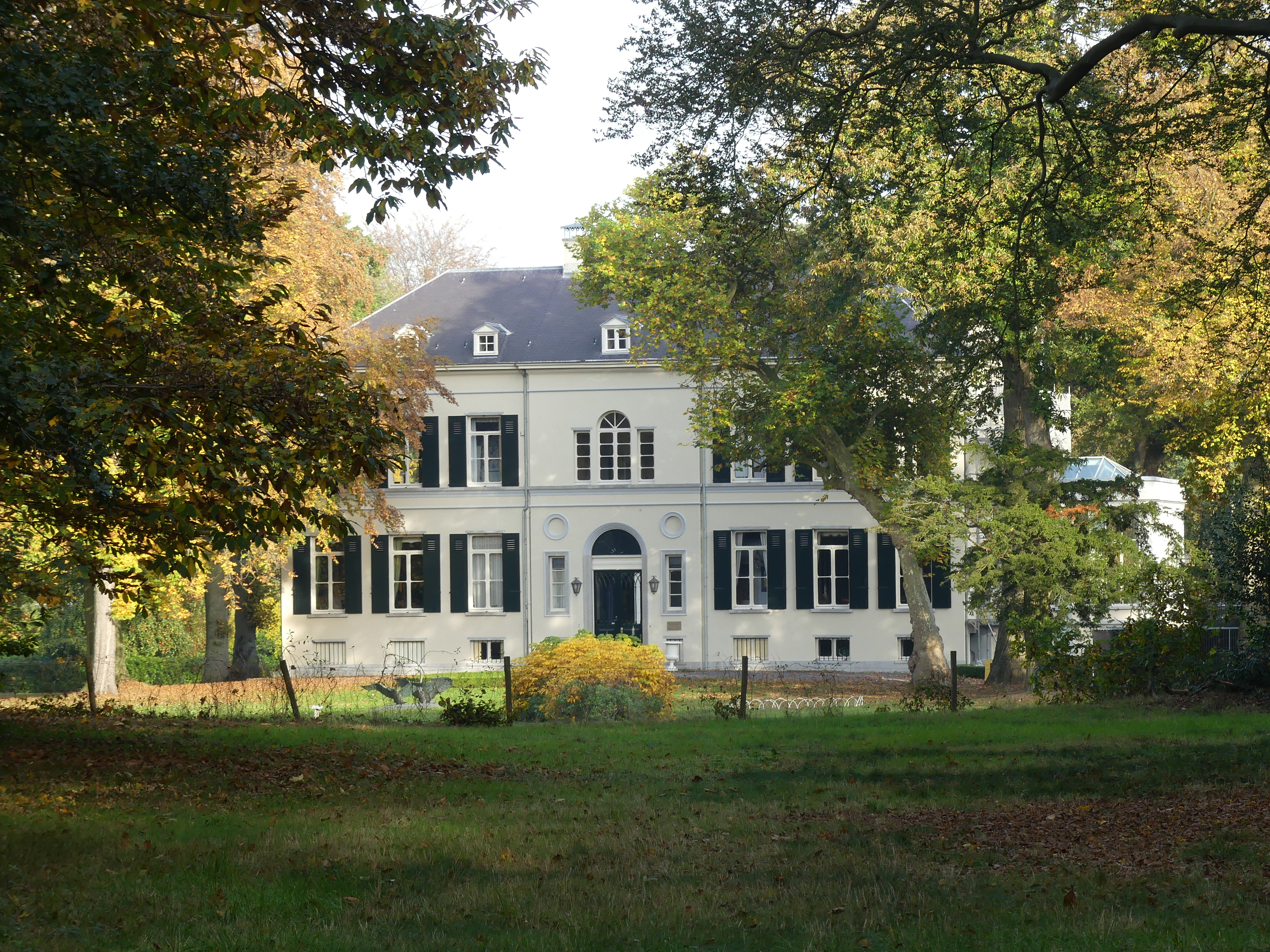
Estate Mattemburgh

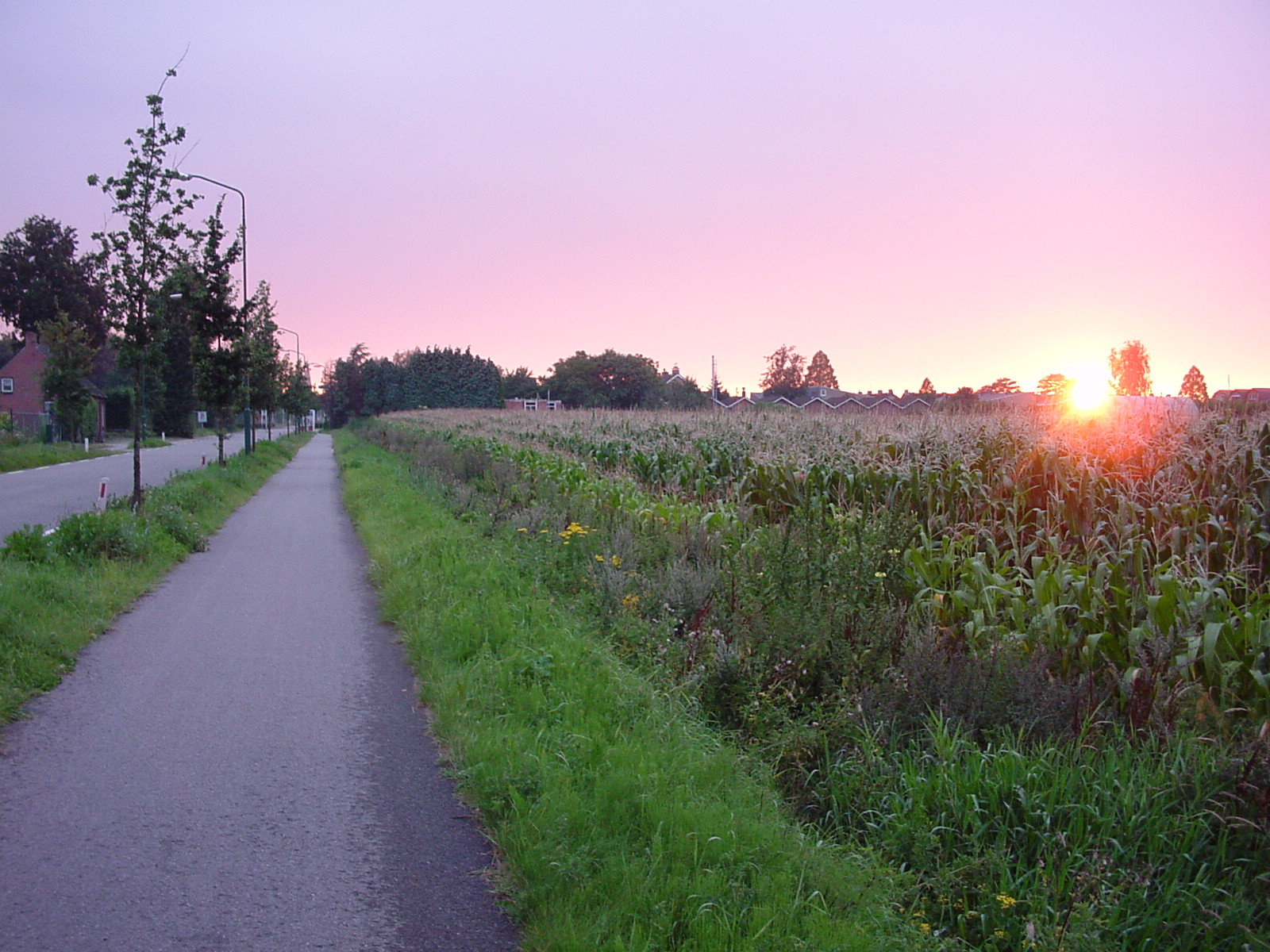
Landscape near Hoogerheide

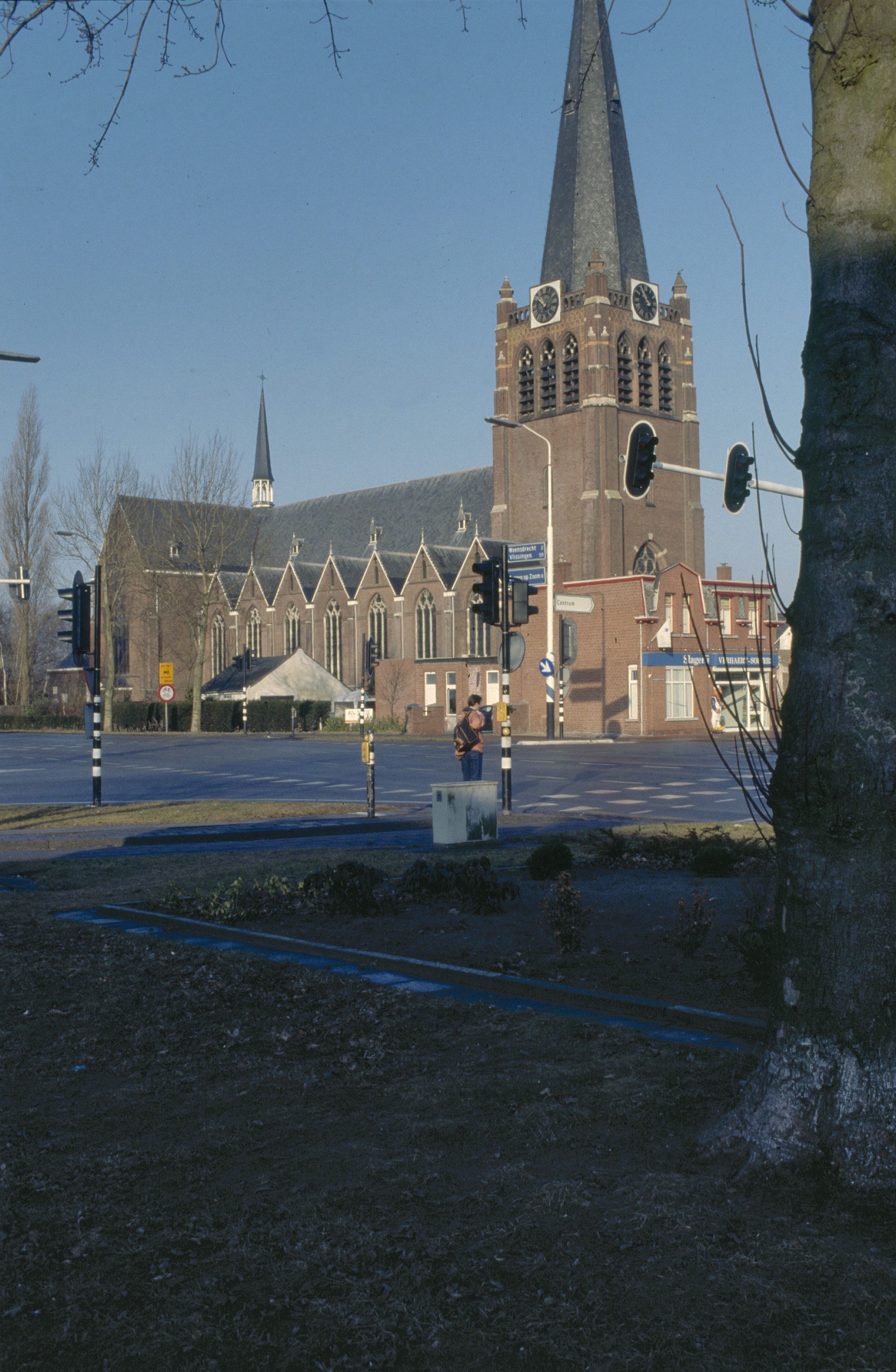
Assumption of Mary Church
