= Potty mouth =

Potty Mouth may refer to:

- Profanity, or a regular user of profanities
- Potty Mouth (Codename: Kids Next Door), toilet-headed villain from the animated television series Codename: Kids Next Door
- "Potty Mouth", episode 74 of The Loud House
- Pottymouth, first studio album by the American punk rock band Bratmobile
- Potty Mouth (band), a Los Angeles-based punk rock band.
- Potty Mouth (EP), EP by the band Potty Mouth
- Potty Mouth (song), by Tyga featuring Busta Rhymes
