= Van der Putten =

van der Putten or Vander Putten is a surname. Notable people with the surname include:

- Debbie van der Putten (born 1985), Dutch model
- Philippe Vander Putten (born 1959), Belgian businessman
- Kai Van Der Putten (born 1978), Film Writer/Director

== See also ==
- Van de Putte - surname
- Van Putten - surname
- Putten (disambiguation)
