= Putty (disambiguation) =

Putty may refer to:

- Putty, plastic material
- PuTTY, ssh/telnet client and terminal emulator
- Putty (computer game)
- Silly Putty, children's toy
- Putty, New South Wales, a small town north west of Sydney
- Putty Patrollers, from Mighty Morphin Power Rangers
- "Jeweler's putty", tin (IV) oxide, formerly known as stannic oxide
- Putty Thing, the villain in The Mask: Animated Series

== See also ==
- Putti (disambiguation)
- Puttee, covering for the lower part of the leg from the ankle to the knee
