= Putte, Netherlands =

Putte
- Village
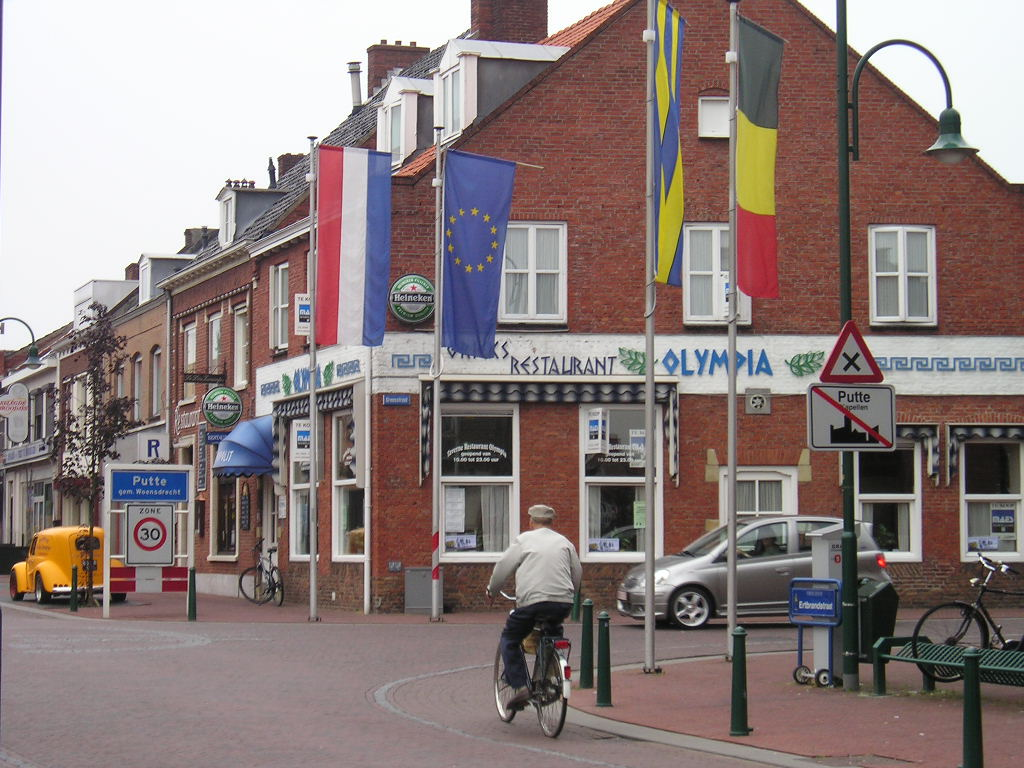
- The border between Belgium and the Netherlands in Putte.

- Location in the province of North Brabant in the Netherlands Putte (Netherlands) Putte (Benelux)
- Coordinates: 51°22′N 4°23′E
- Country: Netherlands
- Province: North Brabant
- Municipality: Woensdrecht

Area
  - Total: 18.51 km^{2} (7.15 sq mi)
- Elevation: 12 m (39 ft)

Population (2021)
  - Total: 3,785
  - Density: 204.5/km^{2} (529.6/sq mi)
- Time zone: UTC+1 (CET)
  - Summer (DST): UTC+2 (CEST)
- Postal code: 4645
- Dialing code: 0164

Putte is part of the Dutch municipality of Woensdrecht, and had 3751 inhabitants as of 1 January 2008. The village lies on and extends over the border between the Netherlands and Belgium, the Belgian part being Putte, Kapellen.

== History ==
The village was first mentioned in 1277 as Pitte and means well. Putte developed around the 14th century Ravenhof Castle which is located in Belgium, but whose park is mainly in the Netherlands. In 1839, the border was defined and the village started to develop along the border road. In 1648, at the Peace of Münster, the border between the Dutch Republic and the Spanish Netherlands was drawn through the village of Putte.

The Catholic St Dionysius Church was built in 1865. The church was destroyed in 1940 by war. In 1950, the tower was rebuilt. The church was rebuilt in 1953 at a distance from the tower. The Moretusbosch is a forest which used to belong to Castle Ravenhof, and contains hexagon Rococo tea house.

Putte was home to 671 people in 1840. During World War I, the border was sealed off and the Wire of Death was constructed to prevent refugees from entering the Netherlands. The former municipality (which merged with several other communities to form the municipality of Woensdrecht in 1997) covered 18,56 sq. kilometres, of which much is forest and moorland.

== Notable people ==
Putte is the burial place of the 17th century Antwerp painter Jacob Jordaens who, as a Protestant, could not be buried in his Roman Catholic hometown. A Jordaens monument stands on the place of the former Protestant cemetery. The village also has three extensive Jewish cemeteries with many graves of Belgian Jews.

The noted artist Marguerite Wildenhain, who was forced to leave her teaching post in Germany because of her Jewish ancestry, came to Putte in 1933. She and her husband Franz established in the town a pottery shop called Het Kruikje (Little Jug) - which existed until the German invasion of the Netherlands in 1940, when Wildenhain was able to find refuge in the US.

== Gallery ==
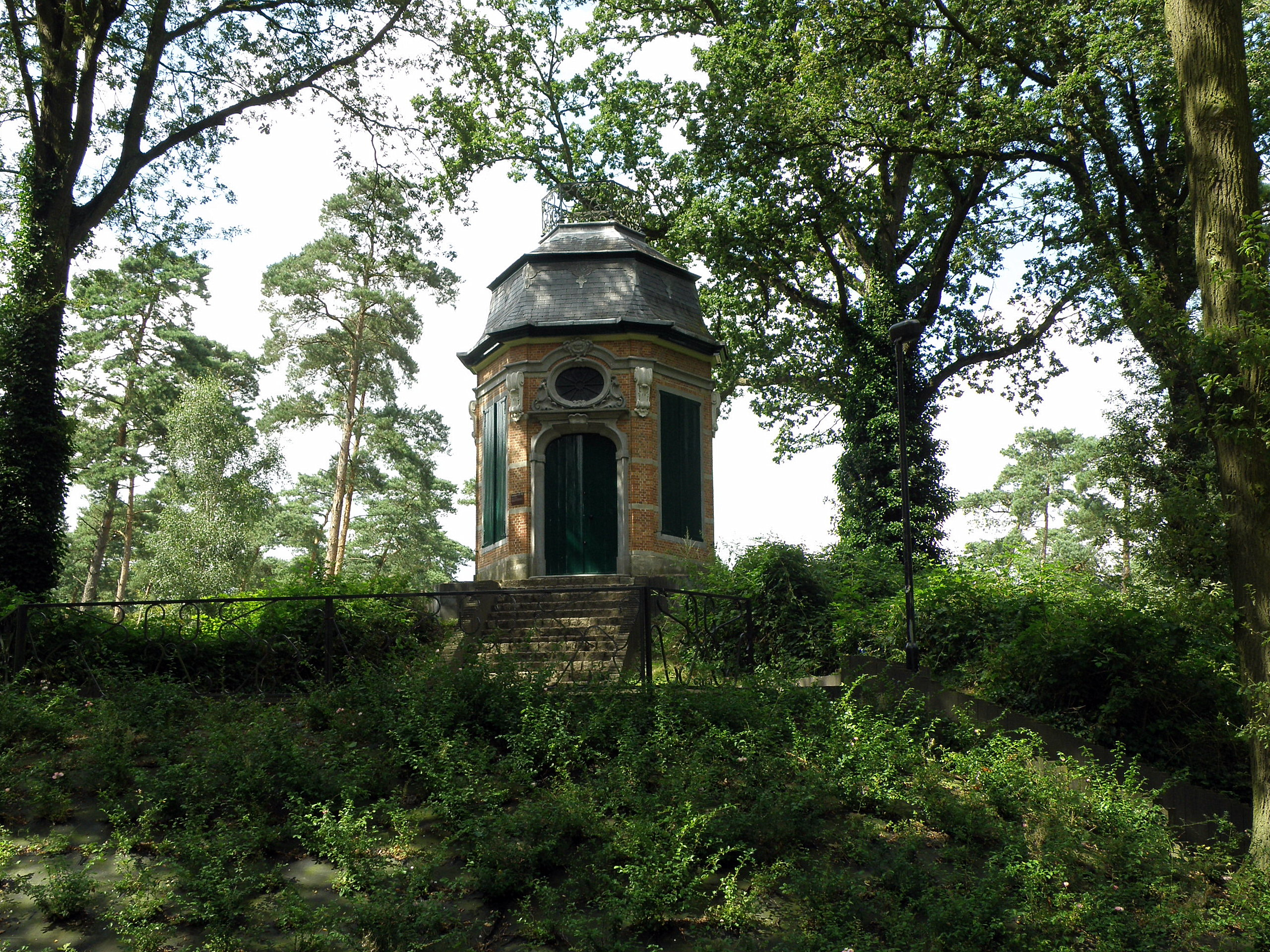
Tea house Ravenhof

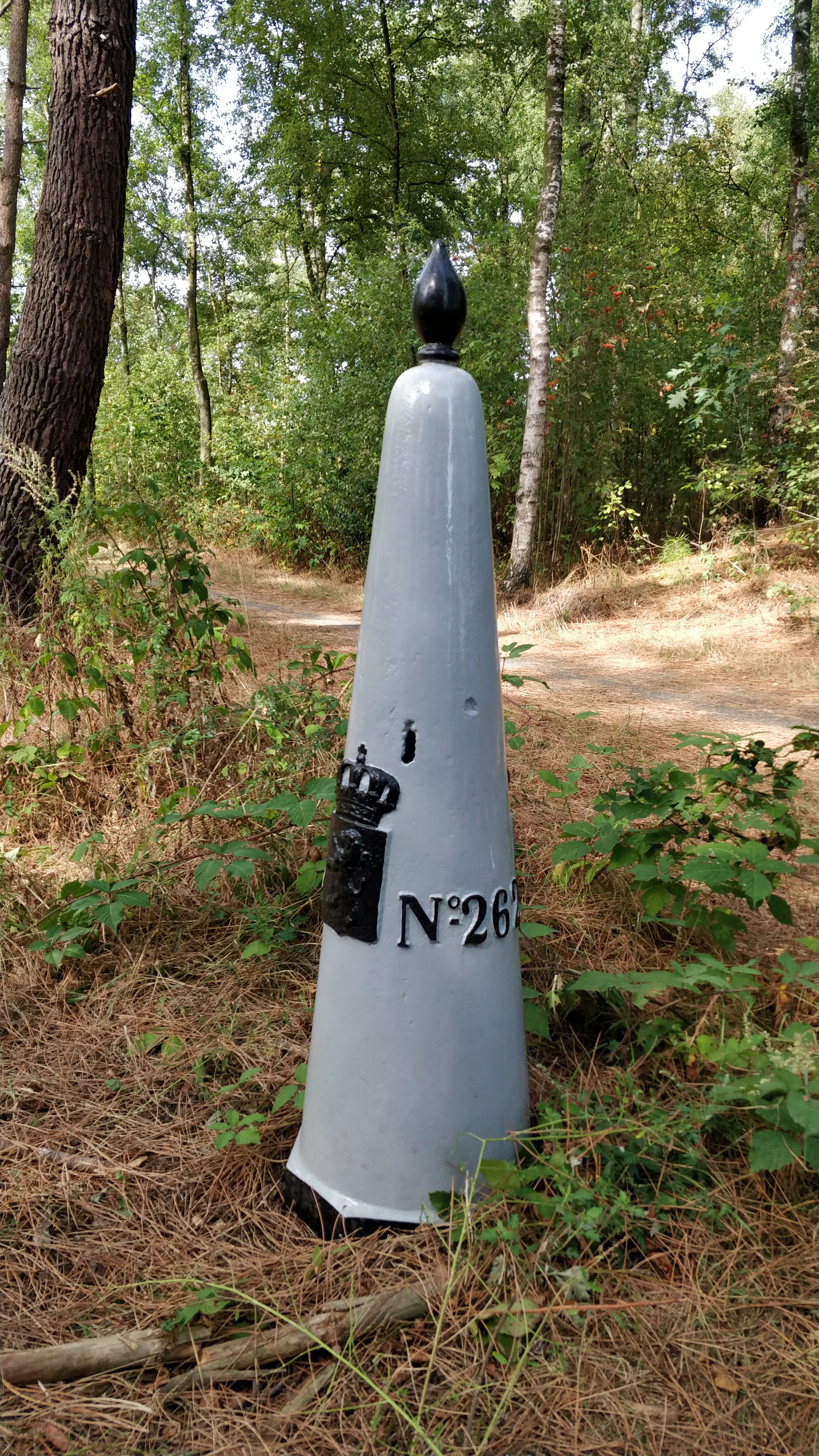
Border pole #262

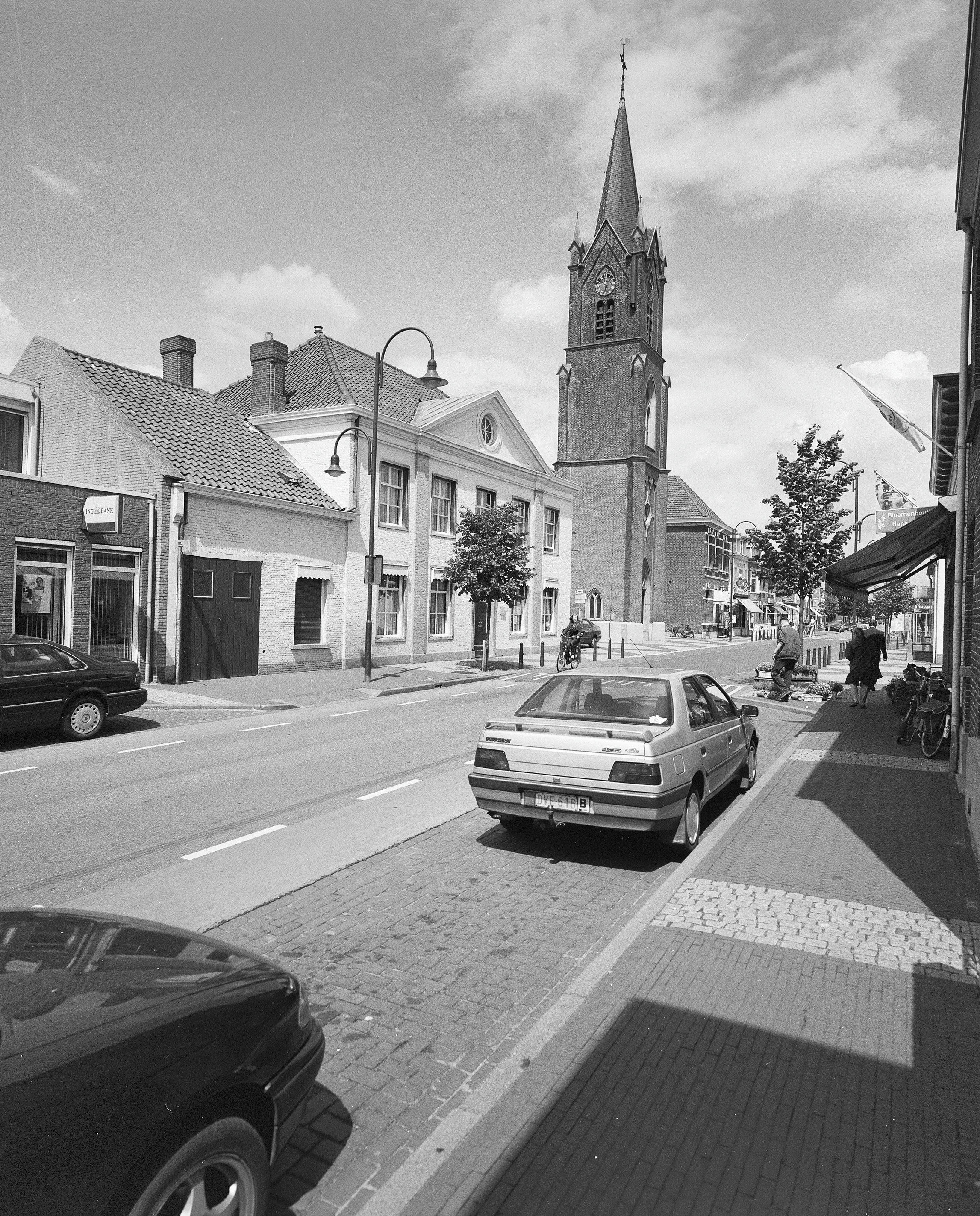
Street view

== See also ==
- Putte, Kapellen
