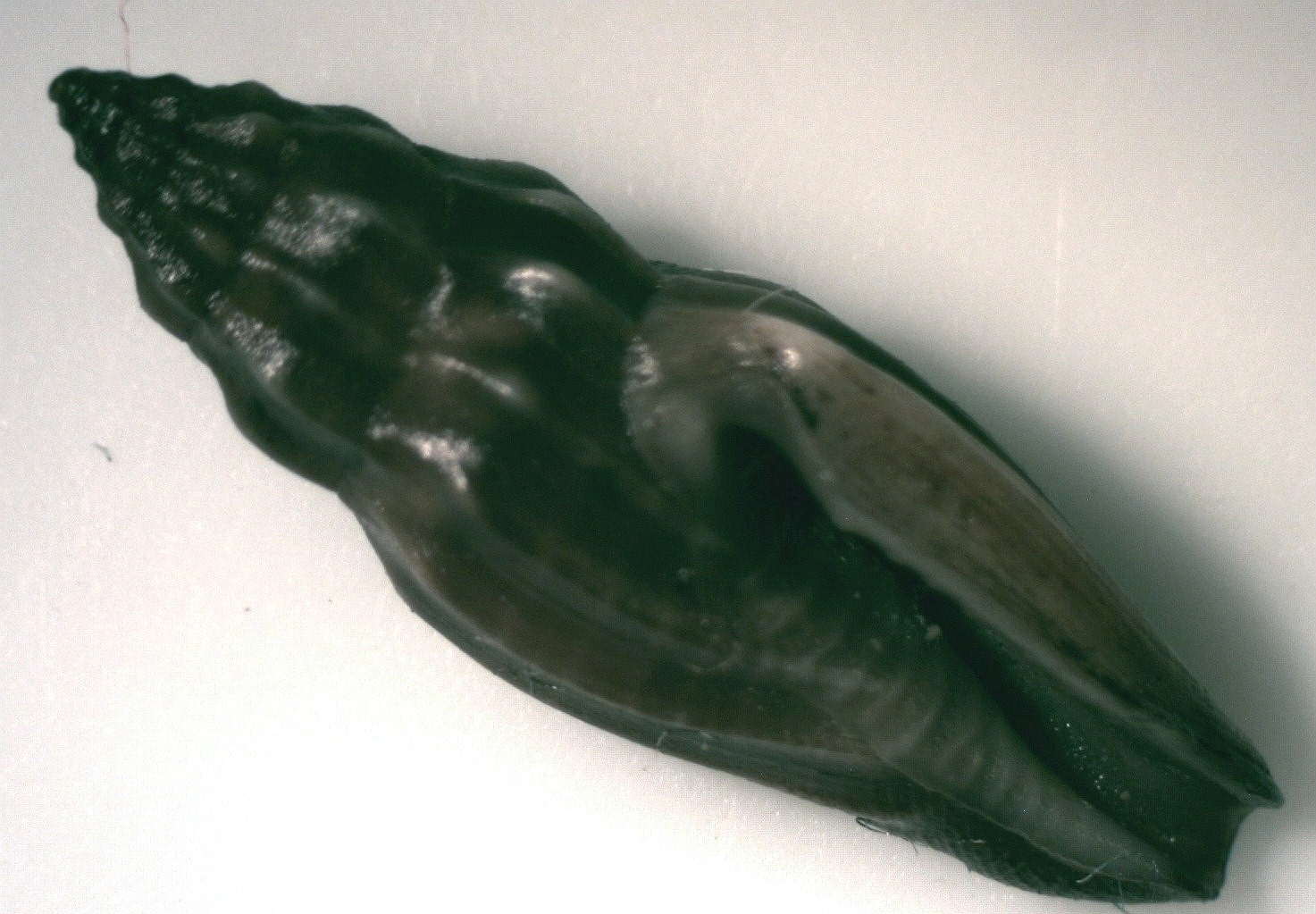
- Apertural view of a shell of Eucithara stromboides

Scientific classification
- Kingdom: Animalia
- Phylum: Mollusca
- Class: Gastropoda
- Subclass: Caenogastropoda
- Order: Neogastropoda
- Superfamily: Conoidea
- Family: Mangeliidae
- Genus: Eucithara
- Species: E. stromboides

Binomial name
- Eucithara stromboides (Reeve, 1846)

Synonyms
- Cithara delaaouriana Crosse, 1869; Cithara stromboides (Reeve, 1846); Mangelia stromboides Reeve, 1846 (original combination)

= Eucithara stromboides =

Species of gastropod

Eucithara stromboides is a small sea snail, a marine gastropod mollusk in the family Mangeliidae.

Kilburn (1992) listed this as a possible synonym of Eucithara fusiformis (Reeve, 1846) and designated a lectotype.

== Description ==
The length of the shell attains 14 mm.

The interstices of the ribs show fine revolving striae. The color of the shell is yellowish white.

== Distribution ==
This marine species occurs off the Philippines and Guam, Queensland (Australia), the New Hebrides and the Red Sea and the Mascarene Basin.
