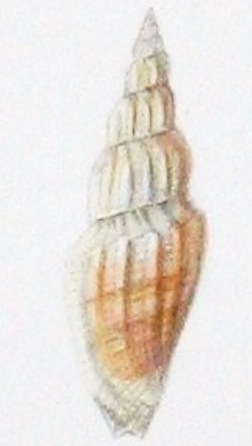
- Shell of Eucithara fusiformis

Scientific classification
- Kingdom: Animalia
- Phylum: Mollusca
- Class: Gastropoda
- Subclass: Caenogastropoda
- Order: Neogastropoda
- Superfamily: Conoidea
- Family: Mangeliidae
- Genus: Eucithara
- Species: E. fusiformis

Binomial name
- Eucithara fusiformis (Reeve, 1846)

Synonyms
- Eucithara hypercalles J.C. Melvill, 1898; Mangelia fusiformis Reeve, 1846 (original combination)

= Eucithara fusiformis =

Species of gastropod

Eucithara fusiformis is a small sea snail, a marine gastropod mollusk in the family Mangeliidae.

== Description ==
The length of the shell varies between 12.7 mm and 16.3 mm.

The shell is yellowish white, stained or interruptedly fasciated with orange-brown. The outer lip has 13-14 teeth, the inner lip 17-18.

== Distribution ==
This marine species occurs off the Philippines and Vanuatu.
