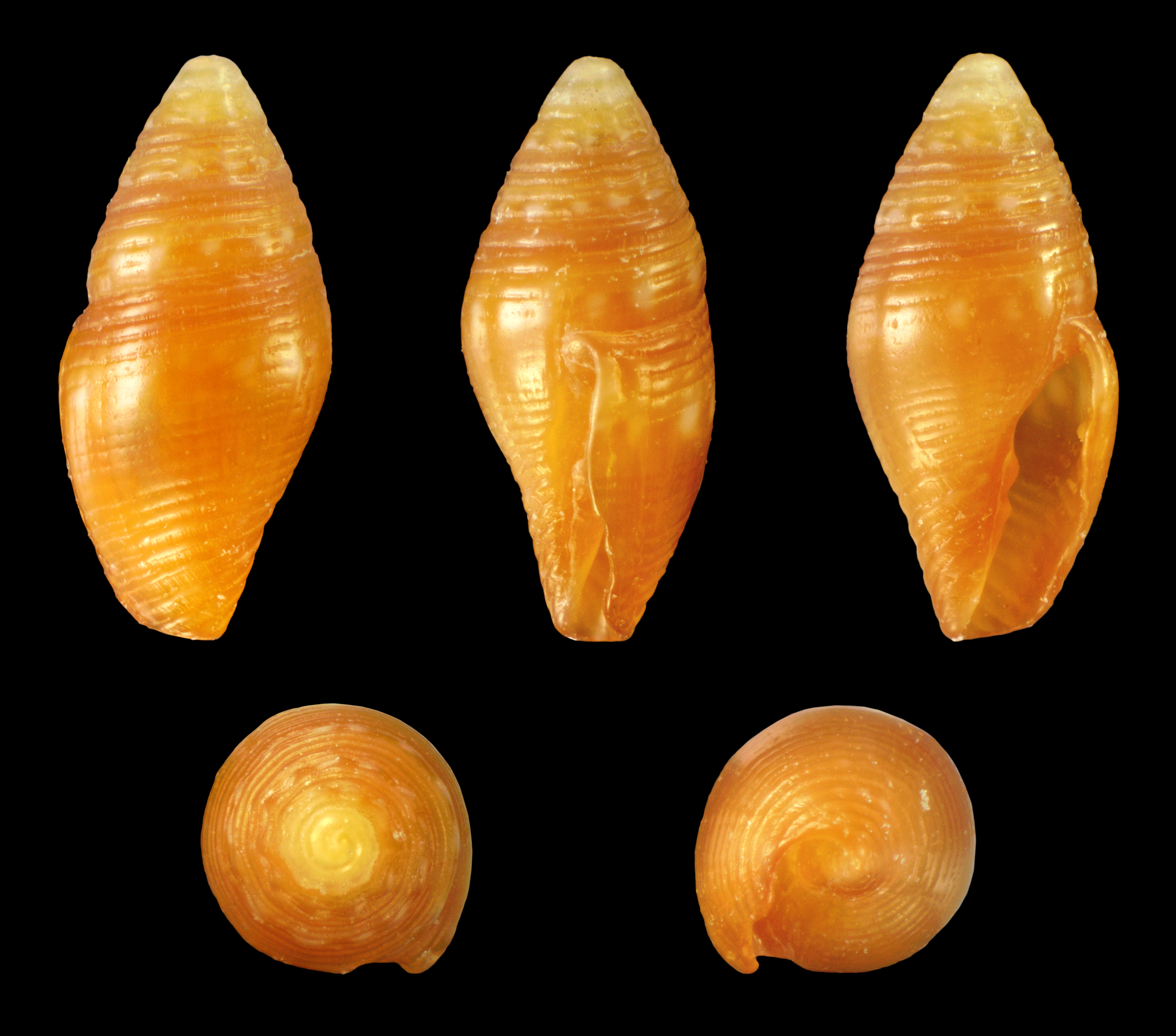
- Mitromorpha canariensis shell

Scientific classification
- Kingdom: Animalia
- Phylum: Mollusca
- Class: Gastropoda
- Subclass: Caenogastropoda
- Order: Neogastropoda
- Superfamily: Conoidea
- Family: Mitromorphidae
- Genus: Mitromorpha; Carpenter, 1865

Type species
- Daphnella filosa Carpenter, 1864

Species
- See text

Synonyms
- †Clinomitra Bellardi, 1889; Cymakra Gardner, 1937; †Diptychomitra Bellardi, 1889; Helenella Casey, 1904; Mitramorpha (variant spelling); Mitrithara Hedley, 1922; Mitrolumna Bucquoy, Dautzenberg & Dollfus, 1883; Mitromorpha (Mitrolumna) Bucquoy, Dautzenberg & Dollfus, 1883· accepted, alternate representation; Mitromorpha (Mitromorpha) Carpenter, 1865· accepted, alternate representation

= Mitromorpha =

Genus of gastropods

Miltromorpha is a genus of sea snails, marine gastropod mollusks in the family Mitromorphidae, in the superfamily Conoidea the cone snails and their allies. This genus was originally described by Carpenter off the west coast of the United States. The species occur mainly on the continental shelf and in insular environments. Their real diversity is poorly understood.

Mitromorpha was previously categorized under the family Conidae, subfamily Clathurellinae..

The genus Mitrolumna Bucquoy, Dautzenberg & Dollfus, 1883 is currently treated as a synonym or subgenus of Mitromorpha, but is available for the Eastern Atlantic and Mediterranean species, if these are considered to form a distinct radiation. The same genus is also used for a number of extinct species:

- Mitrolumna atypica Lozouet, 2015 †
- Mitrolumna hortiensis Lozouet, 1999 †
- Mitrolumna oligomiocenica Lozouet, 2015 †
- Mitrolumna peyroti Lozouet, 2015 †
- Mitrolumna raulini Peyrot, 1928 †
- Mitrolumna titanocola Lozouet, 1999 †
- Mitrolumna ventriosa Lozouet, 2015 †

== Description ==
The small shells have an elongate fusiform shape. They are generally strongly spirally sculptured. The flattened shells are crossed by longitudinal plicae and revolving lirae. The aperture is long and narrowly oval. The anal sinus is in most cases obsolete. The outer lip is acute, smooth within, occasionally scarcely sinuated posteriorly. The columella is straight, bearing a number of short plicae or teeth upon it in the middle and slightly transversely lirate.

== Species ==
Species within the genus Mitromorpha include:

- Mitromorpha alabaster Ortega & Gofas, 2019
- Mitromorpha alba (Petterd, 1879)
- Mitromorpha albosideralis Chino & Stahlschmidt, 2009
- Mitromorpha alphonsiana (Hervier, 1899)
- Mitromorpha alyssae Amati, Smriglio & Oliverio, 2015
- Mitromorpha amphibolos Kilburn, 1986
- Mitromorpha angusta Verco, 1909
- Mitromorpha annobonensis Rolán & Gori, 2012
- Mitromorpha apollinis Thiele, 1925
- Mitromorpha aspera (Carpenter, 1864)
- Mitromorpha axicostata Verco, 1909
- Mitromorpha axiscalpta (Verco, 1909)
- Mitromorpha azorensis Mifsud, 2001
- Mitromorpha barrierensis (Powell, 1942)
- Mitromorpha bassiana (Gabriel, 1956)
- Mitromorpha bella Espinosa & Ortea, 2014
- Mitromorpha benthicola (Dell, 1962)
- Mitromorpha biplicata Dall, 1889
- Mitromorpha bogii Amati, Smriglio & Oliverio, 2015
- † Mitromorpha brachyspira (Suter, 1917)
- Mitromorpha braziliensis Mifsud, 2009
- Mitromorpha brevispira Kilburn, 1986
- Mitromorpha cachiai Mifsud, 2001
- Mitromorpha canariensis Mifsud, 2001
- Mitromorpha candeopontis Chino & Stahlschmidt, 2009
- Mitromorpha canopusensis Mifsud, 2009
- Mitromorpha carpenteri Glibert, 1954
- Mitromorpha chelonion Kilburn, 1986
- Mitromorpha columbellaria (Scacchi, 1836)
- Mitromorpha columnaria (Hedley, 1922)
- Mitromorpha commutabilis (E. A. Smith, 1890)
- Mitromorpha confortinii Horro, Gori, Rosado & Rolán, 2021
- Mitromorpha cossyrae Amati, Smriglio & Oliverio, 2015
- Mitromorpha crassilirata Verco, 1909
- Mitromorpha crenipicta (Dautzenberg, 1889)
- Mitromorpha cubana (Espinosa & Ortea, 2013)
- Mitromorpha dalli Dautzenberg & Fischer, 1896
- Mitromorpha decussata (Dujardin, 1837)
- Mitromorpha denizi Mifsud, 2001
- Mitromorpha diaoyuensis Mifsud, 2013
- Mitromorpha dormitor (Sowerby I, 1844)
- Mitromorpha drivasi (Z.-G. Chang, 1995)
- Mitromorpha engli Mifsud, 2001
- Mitromorpha erycinella (Espinosa & Ortea, 2009)
- Mitromorpha exigua (Von Maltzan, 1884)
- † Mitromorpha fenestrata (A. W. B. Powell, 1944)
- Mitromorpha fischeri (Hervier, 1900)
- Mitromorpha flammulata Chino & Stahlschmidt, 2009
- † Mitromorpha formosa (Marwick, 1931)
- Mitromorpha gemmata Suter, 1908
- Mitromorpha gofasi Mifsud, 2001
- Mitromorpha gracilior (Tryon, 1884)
- Mitromorpha grammatula (Dall, 1927)
- Mitromorpha granulifera (Powell, 1937)
- † Mitromorpha granum (Marwick, 1928)
- Mitromorpha hardyi Horro, Gori, Rosado & Rolán, 2021
- Mitromorpha haycocki (Dall & Bartsch, 1911)
- Mitromorpha herilda (Bartsch, 1915)
- Mitromorpha hernandezi Rolán & Gori, 2012
- Mitromorpha hewitti (Tomlin, 1921)
- Mitromorpha hierroensis Mifsud, 2001
- Mitromorpha iki (Kay, 1979)
- Mitromorpha incerta (Pritchard & Gatliff, 1902)
- Mitromorpha insolens (Casey, 1904)
- Mitromorpha iozona (Hervier, 1899)
- Mitromorpha iridescens Kilburn, 1986
- Mitromorpha jaguaensis Espinosa & Ortea, 2017
- Mitromorpha jovis Thiele, 1925
- Mitromorpha karpathensis (Nordsieck, 1969)
- Mitromorpha keenae (Emerson & Radwin, 1969)
- Mitromorpha kennellyi Kilburn, 1986
- Mitromorpha kilburni Drivas & Jay, 1986
- Mitromorpha laeta (Brazier, 1877)
- Mitromorpha macphersonae (Gabriel, 1956)
- Mitromorpha maculata Sysoev, 1990
- Mitromorpha maraisi Kilburn, 1986
- Mitromorpha mariottinii Amati, Smriglio & Oliverio, 2015
- Mitromorpha mifsudi Amati, Smriglio & Oliverio, 2015
- Mitromorpha mirim Simone & Cunha, 2012
- Mitromorpha monodi (Knudsen, 1956)
- Mitromorpha multicostata May, 1911
- Mitromorpha multigranosa (Smith E. A., 1890)
- Mitromorpha nodilirata Kilburn, 1986
- Mitromorpha nofronii Amati, Smriglio & Oliverio, 2015
- Mitromorpha oliva Chino & Stahlschmidt, 2009
- Mitromorpha olivoidea (Cantraine, 1835)
- Mitromorpha orcutti (Dall, 1920)
- † Mitromorpha panaulax Cossmann, 1901
- Mitromorpha paucilirata Verco, 1909
- Mitromorpha paula Verco, 1909
- Mitromorpha philippinensis Mifsud, 2001
- Mitromorpha pinguis (Hervier, 1900)
- Mitromorpha platacme Kilburn, 1986
- Mitromorpha pleurotomoides (E. A. Smith, 1890)
- Mitromorpha popeae (Faber, 2006)
- Mitromorpha proles (Hedley, 1922)
- Mitromorpha purae Horro, Gori, Rosado & Rolán, 2021
- Mitromorpha regis (Powell, 1937)
- Mitromorpha rotundicostata Kilburn, 1986
- Mitromorpha ryalli Horro, Gori, Rosado & Rolán, 2021
- Mitromorpha sama Simone & Cunha, 2012
- Mitromorpha sanctaluciaensis Espinosa & Ortea, 2017
- Mitromorpha santosi Lima, Barros & Francisco, 2010
- Mitromorpha saotomensis (Rolan & Boyer, 2001)
- Mitromorpha selene (Espinosa & Ortea, 2009)
- Mitromorpha senegalensis (Rolan & Boyer, 2001)
- Mitromorpha separanda (Von Maltzan, 1884)
- Mitromorpha smithi Dautzenberg & Fischer H., 1896
- Mitromorpha spreta (Adams A., 1864)
- Mitromorpha striolata (Turton W. H., 1932)
- Mitromorpha suarezi Rolán & Gori, 2012
- † Mitromorpha subulata Cossmann, 1896
- † Mitromorpha sutherlandica (Powell, 1942)
- Mitromorpha swinneni Mifsud, 2001
- Mitromorpha tagaroae Chino & Stahlschmidt, 2009
- Mitromorpha tenuilirata Kilburn, 1986
- Mitromorpha thalaoides Chino & Stahlschmidt, 2014
- Mitromorpha torticula (Dall, 1889)
- Mitromorpha tricolorata Amati, Smriglio & Oliverio, 2015
- Mitromorpha undulata (Dall, 1927)
- Mitromorpha unilineata Chino & Stahlschmidt, 2014
- Mitromorpha usta (E. A. Smith, 1890)
- Mitromorpha ustulata Kilburn, 1986
- Mitromorpha volva Sowerby III, 1892
- † Mitromorpha waitakiensis (Powell, 1942)
- Mitromorpha wilhelminae (van Aartsen, Menkhorst & Gittenberger, 1984)
- Mitromorpha zilpha (Dall, 1927)

=== Species brought into synonymy ===
- Mitromorpha (Lovellona) Iredale, 1917: synonym of Lovellona Iredale, 1917
- Mitromorpha (Lovellona) stepheni Melvill & Standen, 1897: synonym of Anarithma stepheni (Melvill & Standen, 1897)
- Mitromorpha ambigua Chino & Stahlschmidt, 2009: synonym of Anarithma ambigua (Chino & Stahlschmidt, 2009)
- Mitromorpha atramentosa Reeve, 1849: synonym of Lovellona atramentosa (Reeve, 1849)
- Mitromorpha baileyi (McLean & Poorman, 1971): synonym of Cymakra baileyi McLean & Poorman, 1971
- Mitromorpha brazieri Smith E. A., 1892: synonym of Scrinium brazieri (Smith E. A., 1892)
- Mitromorpha coronata (Reeve, 1849): synonym of Pygmaeconus papalis (Weinkauff, 1875)
- Mitromorpha costifera (May, 1920): synonym of Apaturris costifera May, 1920
- Mitromorpha dorcas (Kuroda, Habe & Oyama, 1971): synonym of Anarithma dorcas Kuroda & Oyama, 1971
- Mitromorpha expeditionis Oliver, 1915: synonym of Apaturris expeditionis (Oliver, 1915)
- Mitromorpha filosa (Carpenter, 1864): synonym of Mitromorpha carpenteri Glibert, 1954
- Mitromorpha flindersi Pritchard, G.B. & J.H. Gatliff, 1899: synonym of Mitromorpha alba (Petterd, 1879)
- Mitromorpha fuscafenestrata Chino & Stahlschmidt, 2014: synonym of Anarithma fuscafenestrata (Chino & Stahlschmidt, 2014)
- Mitromorpha fusiformis Chino & Stahlschmidt, 2009: synonym of Anarithma fusiformis (Chino & Stahlschmidt, 2009)
- Mitromorpha granata (McLean & Poorman, 1971): synonym of Cymakra granata McLean & Poorman, 1971
- Mitromorpha granulata Chino & Stahlschmidt, 2009: synonym of Anarithma granulata (Chino & Stahlschmidt, 2009)
- Mitromorpha jaguaense Espinosa & Ortea, 2017: synonym of Mitromorpha jaguaensis Espinosa & Ortea, 2017
- Mitromorpha lirata Adams A., 1865: synonym of Antimitra lirata (Adams A., 1865)
- Mitromorpha mediterranea Mifsud, 2001: synonym of Mitromorpha columbellaria (Scacchi, 1836)
- Mitromorpha melitensis (Mifsud, 1993): synonym of Mitromorpha olivoidea (Cantraine, 1835)
- Mitromorpha metula (Hinds, 1843): synonym of Anarithma metula (Hinds, 1843)
- Mitromorpha micaria (Hedley, 1912): synonym of Pygmaeconus micarius (Hedley, 1912)
- Mitromorpha mitriformis (Shasky, 1961): synonym of Arielia mitriformis Shasky, 1961
- Mitromorpha nigricingulata Chino & Stahlschmidt, 2009: synonym of Anarithma nigricingulata (Chino & Stahlschmidt, 2009)
- Mitromorpha olivoidea var. granulosa (Bucquoy, Dollfus & Dautzenberg, 1883): synonym of Mitromorpha columbellaria (Scacchi, 1836)
- Mitromorpha pallidula Hedley, 1906: synonym of Aesopus pallidulus (Hedley, 1906)
- Mitromorpha papalis (Weinkauff, 1875): synonym of Pygmaeconus papalis (Weinkauff, 1875)
- Mitromorpha peaseana (Finlay H.J., 1927): synonym of Lovellona peaseana Finlay, 1927
- Mitromorpha poppei Chino & Stahlschmidt, 2009: synonym of Anarithma poppei (Chino & Stahlschmidt, 2009)
- Mitromorpha punctata Chino & Stahlschmidt, 2009: synonym of Anarithma punctata (Chino & Stahlschmidt, 2009)
- Mitromorpha purpurata Chino & Stahlschmidt, 2009: synonym of Anarithma purpurata (Chino & Stahlschmidt, 2009)
- Mitromorpha pylei Chino & Stahlschmidt, 2014: synonym of Anarithma pylei Chino & Stahlschmidt, 2014
- Mitromorpha rubrimaculata Chino & Stahlschmidt, 2009: synonym of Anarithma rubrimaculata (Chino & Stahlschmidt, 2009)
- Mitromorpha salisburyi (Cernohorsky, 1978): synonym of Anarithma salisburyi (Cernohorsky, 1978)
- Mitromorpha sanctaluciaense Espinosa & Ortea, 2017: synonym of Mitromorpha sanctaluciaensis Espinosa & Ortea, 2017 (wrong gender agreement of specific epithet)
- Mitromorpha solida May, 1911: synonym of Aesopus solidus (May, 1911)
- Mitromorpha stepheni (Melvill & Standen, 1897): synonym of Anarithma stepheni (Melvill & Standen, 1897)
- Mitromorpha substriata (Suter, 1899): synonym of Aoteatilia substriata (Suter, 1899)
- Mitromorpha tenuicolor Chino & Stahlschmidt, 2009: synonym of Anarithma tenuicolor (Chino & Stahlschmidt, 2009)
- Mitromorpha suteri Murdoch, 1905: synonym of Maorimorpha suteri (Murdoch, 1905)
- Mitromorpha veneris Barnard, 1964: synonym of Charitodoron veneris (Barnard, 1964)
