= Mitromorpha macphersonae =

Scientific classification
- Kingdom: Animalia
- Phylum: Mollusca
- Class: Gastropoda
- Subclass: Caenogastropoda
- Order: Neogastropoda
- Superfamily: Conoidea
- Family: Mitromorphidae
- Genus: Mitromorpha
- Species: M. macphersonae

Binomial name
- Mitromorpha macphersonae (Gabriel, 1956)

Synonyms
- Mitrithara macphersonae Gabriel, 1956; Mitromorpha (Mitrolumna) macphersonae (Gabriel, 1956)

Species of gastropod

Mitromorpha macphersonae is a species of sea snail, a marine gastropod mollusk in the family Mitromorphidae.

== Distribution ==
This marine species is endemic to Australia and occurs in the Bass Strait, and off Tasmania and Victoria.
