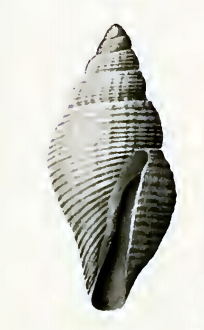
- Original image of a shell of Mitromorpha proles

Scientific classification
- Kingdom: Animalia
- Phylum: Mollusca
- Class: Gastropoda
- Subclass: Caenogastropoda
- Order: Neogastropoda
- Superfamily: Conoidea
- Family: Mitromorphidae
- Genus: Mitromorpha
- Species: M. proles

Binomial name
- Mitromorpha proles (Hedley, 1922)

Synonyms
- Mitrithara proles Hedley, 1922 (original combination); Mitromorpha (Mitrolumna) proles (Hedley, 1922)

= Mitromorpha proles =

Species of gastropod

Mitromorpha proles is a species of sea snail, a marine gastropod mollusk in the family Mitromorphidae.

== Description ==
The length of the shell attains 6 mm, its diameter 2.7 mm.

(Original description) The small, rather thin shell has an ovate-fusiform shape. Its colour is buff, clouded with pale brown on the periphery. The shell contains 6 whorls, including two of the protoconch. The sculpture of the whole shell is overrun with spiral flat-topped cords, which become gradually smaller and closer on approaching the anterior end. There are; twenty-five of these on the body whorl, of which eight ascend the penultimate whorl. The radials are curved delicate riblets, tapering upwards, and vanishing before reaching the summit of the whorl. These riblets disappear on the body whorl. The penultimate carries about twenty five. The aperture is wide. The sinus a slight sigmoid flexure. The outer lip is thin, curved forward; deep within are fifteen short spiral lyrae. There are two small plications on the columella. The siphonal canal is short and broad.

== Distribution ==
This species is endemic to Australia and occurs off New South Wales.
