= Mitromorpha canopusensis =

Scientific classification
- Kingdom: Animalia
- Phylum: Mollusca
- Class: Gastropoda
- Subclass: Caenogastropoda
- Order: Neogastropoda
- Superfamily: Conoidea
- Family: Mitromorphidae
- Genus: Mitromorpha
- Species: M. canopusensis

Binomial name
- Mitromorpha canopusensis Mifsud, 2009

Species of gastropod

Mitromorpha canopusensis is a species of sea snail, a marine gastropod mollusk in the family Mitromorphidae.

== Distribution ==
This marine species occurs in the Western Atlantic Ocean.
