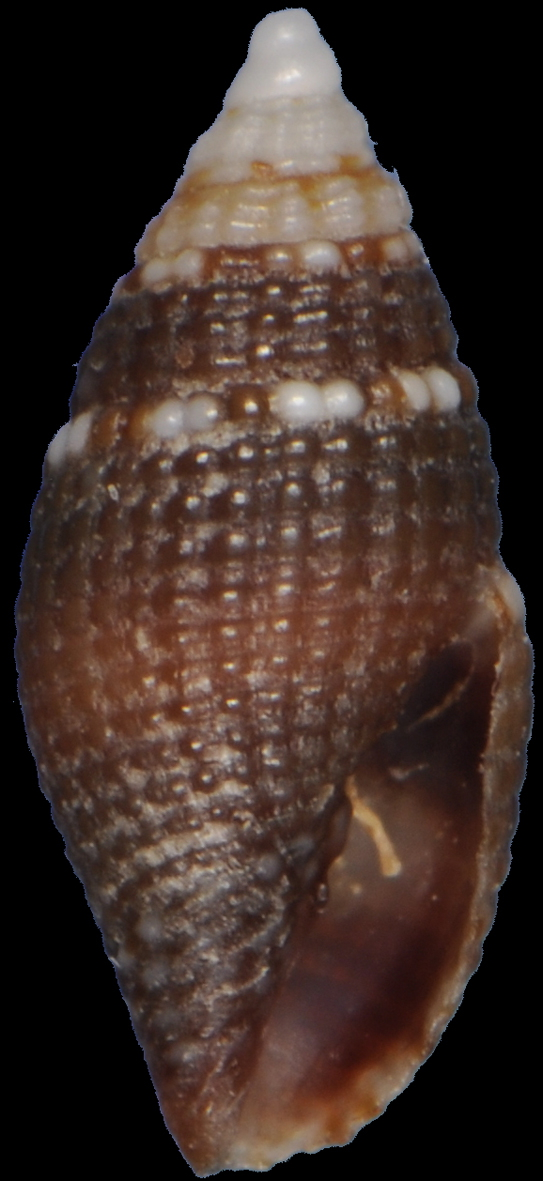
- Shell of Mitromorpha popeae (specimen at MNHN, Paris)

Scientific classification
- Kingdom: Animalia
- Phylum: Mollusca
- Class: Gastropoda
- Subclass: Caenogastropoda
- Order: Neogastropoda
- Superfamily: Conoidea
- Family: Mitromorphidae
- Genus: Mitromorpha
- Species: M. popeae

Binomial name
- Mitromorpha popeae (Faber, 2006)

Synonyms
- Mitrolumna popeae Faber, 2006

= Mitromorpha popeae =

Species of gastropod

Mitromorpha popeae is a species of sea snail, a marine gastropod mollusk in the family Mitromorphidae.

== Distribution ==
This species occurs in the Caribbean Sea off Guadeloupe.
