= Mitromorpha bella =

Scientific classification
- Kingdom: Animalia
- Phylum: Mollusca
- Class: Gastropoda
- Subclass: Caenogastropoda
- Order: Neogastropoda
- Superfamily: Conoidea
- Family: Mitromorphidae
- Genus: Mitromorpha
- Species: M. bella

Binomial name
- Mitromorpha bella Espinosa & Ortea, 2014

Species of gastropod

Mitromorpha bella is a species of sea snail, a marine gastropod mollusk in the family Mitromorphidae.

== Distribution ==
This species occurs in the Caribbean Sea off Cuba.
