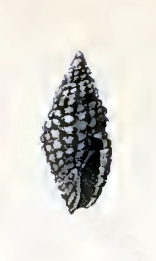
- Original image of a shell of Mitromorpha commutabilis

Scientific classification
- Kingdom: Animalia
- Phylum: Mollusca
- Class: Gastropoda
- Subclass: Caenogastropoda
- Order: Neogastropoda
- Superfamily: Conoidea
- Family: Mitromorphidae
- Genus: Mitromorpha
- Species: M. commutabilis

Binomial name
- Mitromorpha commutabilis (E. A. Smith, 1890)

Synonyms
- Mitrolumna commutabilis (E. A. Smith, 1890); Mitromorpha (Mitrolumna) commutabilis E. A. Smith, 1890; Pleurotoma (Clathurella) commutabilis E. A. Smith, 1890

= Mitromorpha commutabilis =

Species of gastropod

Mitromorpha commutabilis is a species of sea snail, a marine gastropod mollusk in the family Mitromorphidae.

== Description ==
The length of the shell attains 4 mm, its diameter 1.5 mm.

(Original description) This species is very distinctly characterized by its ovate-fusiform form and the coarse style of its sculpture. The longitudinal ribs and the twelve transverse lirae are about equally thick, produced into acute nodules at the points of intersection, and the quadrate interstices are very deeply pitted. The shell contains 5½ slightly convex whorls, including 1½ vitreous whorl in the protoconch. The small aperture is narrow. The outer lip is slightly incrassate. The wide siphonal canal is very short. The small sinus is inconspicuous. The columella is upright and shows two tubercles in the middle.

== Distribution ==
This species occurs in the Atlantic Ocean off St. Helena.
