= Mitromorpha monodi =

Scientific classification
- Kingdom: Animalia
- Phylum: Mollusca
- Class: Gastropoda
- Subclass: Caenogastropoda
- Order: Neogastropoda
- Superfamily: Conoidea
- Family: Mitromorphidae
- Genus: Mitromorpha
- Species: M. monodi

Binomial name
- Mitromorpha monodi (Knudsen, 1956)

Synonyms
- Mitra monodi Knudsen, 1956

Species of gastropod

Mitromorpha monodi is a species of sea snail, a marine gastropod mollusk in the family Mitromorphidae.

== Description ==
The length of the shell attains 4.9 mm.

== Distribution ==
This marine species occurs off Senegal.
