= Mitromorpha erycinella =

Scientific classification
- Kingdom: Animalia
- Phylum: Mollusca
- Class: Gastropoda
- Subclass: Caenogastropoda
- Order: Neogastropoda
- Superfamily: Conoidea
- Family: Mitromorphidae
- Genus: Mitromorpha
- Species: M. erycinella

Binomial name
- Mitromorpha erycinella (Espinosa & Ortea, 2009)

Synonyms
- Mitrolumna biplicata (Dall, 1889); Mitrolumna erycinella Espinosa & Ortea, 2009

Species of gastropod

Mitromorpha erycinella is a species of sea snail, a marine gastropod mollusk in the family Mitromorphidae.

== Distribution ==
This species occurs in the Caribbean Sea off Cuba.
