= Mitromorpha cachiai =

Scientific classification
- Kingdom: Animalia
- Phylum: Mollusca
- Class: Gastropoda
- Subclass: Caenogastropoda
- Order: Neogastropoda
- Superfamily: Conoidea
- Family: Mitromorphidae
- Genus: Mitromorpha
- Species: M. cachiai

Binomial name
- Mitromorpha cachiai Mifsud, 2001

Synonyms
- Mitromorpha (Mitrolumna) cachiai Mifsud, 2001

Species of gastropod

Mitromorpha cachiai is a species of sea snail, a marine gastropod mollusk in the family Mitromorphidae.

== Description ==
The length of the shell varies between 4 mm and 6 mm.

== Distribution ==
This marine species occurs off the Canary Islands.
