= Mitromorpha sanctaluciaensis =

Scientific classification
- Kingdom: Animalia
- Phylum: Mollusca
- Class: Gastropoda
- Subclass: Caenogastropoda
- Order: Neogastropoda
- Superfamily: Conoidea
- Family: Mitromorphidae
- Genus: Mitromorpha
- Species: M. sanctaluciaensis

Binomial name
- Mitromorpha sanctaluciaensis Espinosa & Ortea, 2017

Synonyms
- Mitromorpha sanctaluciaense Espinosa & Ortea, 2017 (wrong gender agreement of specific epithet)

Species of gastropod

Mitromorpha sanctaluciaensis is a species of sea snail, a marine gastropod mollusk in the family Mitromorphidae.

== Distribution ==
This species occurs in the Caribbean Sea off Cuba.
