= Mitromorpha decussata =

Scientific classification
- Kingdom: Animalia
- Phylum: Mollusca
- Class: Gastropoda
- Subclass: Caenogastropoda
- Order: Neogastropoda
- Superfamily: Conoidea
- Family: Mitromorphidae
- Genus: Mitromorpha
- Species: M. decussata

Binomial name
- Mitromorpha decussata (Dujardin, 1837)

Synonyms
- Mitra decussata Dujardin, 1837; Mitra subdecussata d'Orbigny, A.V.M.D., 1852 (unnecessary nomen novum); Mitromorpha (Mitrolumna) decussata (Dujardin, F., 1837)

Species of gastropod

Mitromorpha decussata is a species of sea snail, a marine gastropod mollusk in the family Mitromorphidae.

== Distribution ==
This marine species occurs off France.
