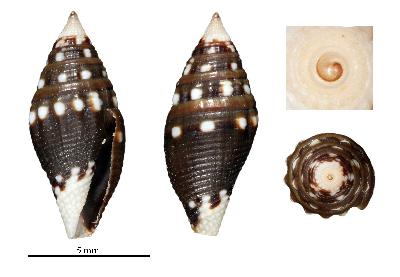
- Shells of Mitromorpha albosideralis (paratype in the MNHN, Paris)

Scientific classification
- Kingdom: Animalia
- Phylum: Mollusca
- Class: Gastropoda
- Subclass: Caenogastropoda
- Order: Neogastropoda
- Superfamily: Conoidea
- Family: Mitromorphidae
- Genus: Mitromorpha
- Species: M. albosideralis

Binomial name
- Mitromorpha albosideralis Chino & Stahlschmidt, 2009

= Mitromorpha albosideralis =

Species of gastropod

Mitromorpha albosideralis is a species of sea snail, a marine gastropod mollusk in the family Mitromorphidae.

== Description ==
The length of the shell varies between 7 mm and 10 mm.

== Distribution ==
This marine species occurs off the Philippines.
