= Mitromorpha keenae =

Scientific classification
- Kingdom: Animalia
- Phylum: Mollusca
- Class: Gastropoda
- Subclass: Caenogastropoda
- Order: Neogastropoda
- Superfamily: Conoidea
- Family: Mitromorphidae
- Genus: Mitromorpha
- Species: M. keenae

Binomial name
- Mitromorpha keenae (Emerson & Radwin, 1969)

Synonyms
- Mitrolumna keenae Emerson & Radwin, 1969

Species of gastropod

Mitromorpha keenae is a species of sea snail, a marine gastropod mollusk in the family Mitromorphidae.

== Distribution ==
This marine species occurs off the Galapagos Islands.
