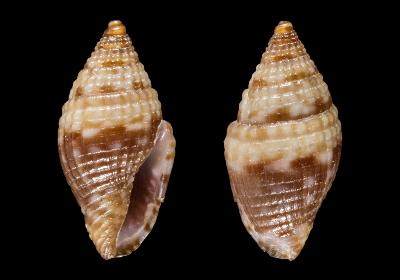
- Shell of Mitromorpha suarezi (holotype at MNHN, Paris)

Scientific classification
- Kingdom: Animalia
- Phylum: Mollusca
- Class: Gastropoda
- Subclass: Caenogastropoda
- Order: Neogastropoda
- Superfamily: Conoidea
- Family: Mitromorphidae
- Genus: Mitromorpha
- Species: M. suarezi

Binomial name
- Mitromorpha suarezi Rolán & Gori, 2012

= Mitromorpha suarezi =

Species of gastropod

Mitromorpha suarezi is a species of sea snail, a marine gastropod mollusk in the family Mitromorphidae. It was described by Rolán and Simone Gori in 2012 and is endemic to the island of Príncipe in the Gulf of Guinea.

== Description ==
The shell reaches a length of approximately 4.7 mm, is slender and fusiform, with fine axial and spiral sculpture. Its coloration is typically pale with darker markings, though exact color patterns may vary slightly among individuals. Detailed morphological traits, including the protoconch structure and aperture features, were documented in the original description.

== Distribution ==
This species is found exclusively in marine waters off Príncipe Island, part of São Tomé and Príncipe in the Gulf of Guinea. The holotype is preserved at the Muséum National d’Histoire Naturelle in Paris. Images and additional shell information are also available via online shell databases.
