= Mitromorpha saotomensis =

Scientific classification
- Kingdom: Animalia
- Phylum: Mollusca
- Class: Gastropoda
- Subclass: Caenogastropoda
- Order: Neogastropoda
- Family: Mitromorphidae
- Genus: Mitromorpha
- Species: M. saotomensis

Binomial name
- Mitromorpha saotomensis (Rolan & Boyer, 2001)

Synonyms
- Mitrolumna saotomensis Rolan & Boyer, 2001; Mitromorpha (Mitrolumna) saotomensis (Rolan & Boyer, 2001)

Species of gastropod

Mitromorpha saotomensis is a species of sea snail, a marine gastropod mollusk in the family Mitromorphidae.

== Distribution ==
This species occurs in the Atlantic Ocean off São Tomé and Príncipe.
