= Mitromorpha denizi =

Scientific classification
- Kingdom: Animalia
- Phylum: Mollusca
- Class: Gastropoda
- Subclass: Caenogastropoda
- Order: Neogastropoda
- Superfamily: Conoidea
- Family: Mitromorphidae
- Genus: Mitromorpha
- Species: M. denizi

Binomial name
- Mitromorpha denizi Mifsud, 2001

Synonyms
- Mitromorpha (Mitrolumna) denizi Mifsud, 2001

Species of gastropod

Mitromorpha denizi is a species of sea snail, a marine gastropod mollusk that belongs to the family Mitromorphidae.

== Description ==
The length of the shell varies between 6 mm and 8 mm.

== Distribution ==
This species is often found in the Atlantic Ocean off the Western Sahara.
