= Mitromorpha barrierensis =

Scientific classification
- Kingdom: Animalia
- Phylum: Mollusca
- Class: Gastropoda
- Subclass: Caenogastropoda
- Order: Neogastropoda
- Superfamily: Conoidea
- Family: Mitromorphidae
- Genus: Mitromorpha
- Species: M. barrierensis

Binomial name
- Mitromorpha barrierensis (Powell, 1942)

Synonyms
- Mitrithara barrierensis Powell, 1942; Mitromorpha (Mitrolumna) barrierensis (Powell, 1942)

Species of gastropod

Mitromorpha barrierensis is a species of sea snail, a marine gastropod mollusk in the family Mitromorphidae.

== Distribution ==
This species is endemic to New Zealand and occurs off Little Barrier Island, North Island.
