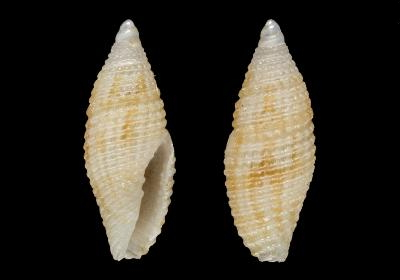
- Shell of Mitromorpha thalaoides (holotype at MNHN, Paris)

Scientific classification
- Kingdom: Animalia
- Phylum: Mollusca
- Class: Gastropoda
- Subclass: Caenogastropoda
- Order: Neogastropoda
- Superfamily: Conoidea
- Family: Mitromorphidae
- Genus: Mitromorpha
- Species: M. thalaoides

Binomial name
- Mitromorpha thalaoides Chino & Stahlschmidt, 2014

= Mitromorpha thalaoides =

Species of gastropod

Mitromorpha thalaoides is a species of sea snail, a marine gastropod mollusk in the family Mitromorphidae.

== Description ==
The length of the shell varies between 3 mm and 4.1 mm.

== Distribution ==
This marine species occurs off the Loyalty Islands, Vanuatu and the Philippines.
