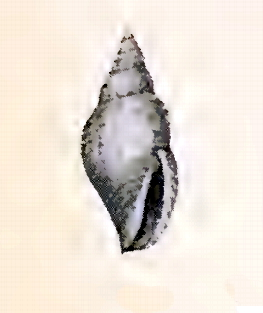
- Original image of a shell of Mitromorpha incerta

Scientific classification
- Kingdom: Animalia
- Phylum: Mollusca
- Class: Gastropoda
- Subclass: Caenogastropoda
- Order: Neogastropoda
- Superfamily: Conoidea
- Family: Mitromorphidae
- Genus: Mitromorpha
- Species: M. incerta

Binomial name
- Mitromorpha incerta (Pritchard & Gatliff, 1902)

Synonyms
- Mangilia incerta Pritchard & Gatliff, 1902

= Mitromorpha incerta =

Species of gastropod

Mitromorpha incerta is a species of sea snail, a marine gastropod mollusk in the family Mitromorphidae.

== Description ==
The length of the shell is 4.1 mm, its diameter 1.6 mm.

(Original description) The uniform light brown shell is small, narrow, somewhat solid and has a fusiform shape. It is composed of 5½ slightly convex whorls, with a well impressed suture. The embryonic portion consists of 1½ whorl smooth and slightly swollen from the dorsal aspect, and apparently with an exsert tip. The penultimate and spire whorls relatively strongly ornate, with close narrow ribs traversed by a few strong spiral threads. On the penultimate whorl itself there are twelve or thirteen ribs which are broader than the interspaces, and there are about five spiral threads, the median one being the coarsest. The ribs gradually fade out on the body whorl, but there are numerous (about fifteen) more or less irregular spiral threads, the strongest being situated at about the shoulder. The aperture is elongate-ovate, a little less than half the length of the shell, with a very broad anterior canal. The columella is smooth, slightly excavated medially, and with a gentle twist towards the anterior end.

The protoconch is conical. The shell shows three subconvex whorls. The suture is shallow. The, whorls are minutely granulated in spiral rows, fifteen in the third whorl.

== Distribution ==
This marine species is endemic to Australia and occurs off Victoria and South Australia.
