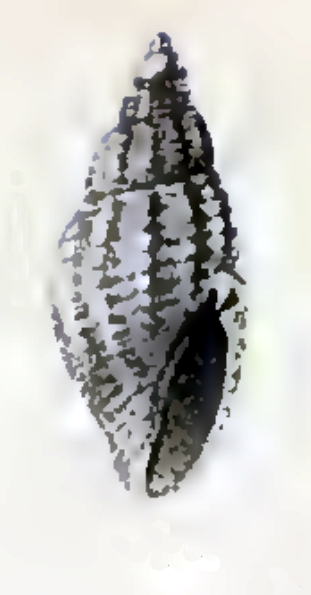
- Original image of a shell of Mitromorpha usta

Scientific classification
- Kingdom: Animalia
- Phylum: Mollusca
- Class: Gastropoda
- Subclass: Caenogastropoda
- Order: Neogastropoda
- Superfamily: Conoidea
- Family: Mitromorphidae
- Genus: Mitromorpha
- Species: M. usta

Binomial name
- Mitromorpha usta (E. A. Smith, 1890)

Synonyms
- Mitrolumna usta (E. A. Smith, 1890); Mitromorpha (Mitrolumna) usta E. A. Smith, 1890; Pleurotoma (Clathurella) usta E. A. Smith, 1890 (basionym)

= Mitromorpha usta =

Species of gastropod

Mitromorpha usta is a species of sea snail, a marine gastropod mollusk in the family Mitromorphidae.

== Description ==
The length of the shell attains 2¾ mm, its diameter 1½ mm.

(Original description) The minute, ovate-fusiform shell contains 5 slightly convex whorls, including 1½ smooth whorls in the protoconch. Its color is blackish to reddish with below the suture a series of white granules. The 12–14 longitudinal ribs are slightly oblique. The sulci (in the upper whorls 4, in the body whorl about 15) cut through the ribs and produce a somewhat granular appearance. The lira beneath the first sulcus below the suture is that which is white upon the riblets in the black variety. The aperture is elongate and narrow. The columella is slightly oblique with a small callus. The outer lip is probably slightly incrassate and at the top slightly sinuate.

== Distribution ==
This species occurs in the Atlantic Ocean off St. Helena.
