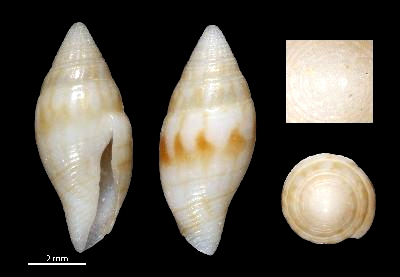
- Shells of Mitromorpha flammulata (paratype in the MNHN, Paris)

Scientific classification
- Kingdom: Animalia
- Phylum: Mollusca
- Class: Gastropoda
- Subclass: Caenogastropoda
- Order: Neogastropoda
- Superfamily: Conoidea
- Family: Mitromorphidae
- Genus: Mitromorpha
- Species: M. flammulata

Binomial name
- Mitromorpha flammulata Chino & Stahlschmidt, 2009

= Mitromorpha flammulata =

Species of gastropod

Mitromorpha flammulata is a species of sea snail, a marine gastropod mollusk in the family Mitromorphidae.

== Description ==
The length of the shell varies between 6.5 mm and 9 mm.

== Distribution ==
This marine species occurs off Okinawa, Japan, Guam, and the Marianas.
