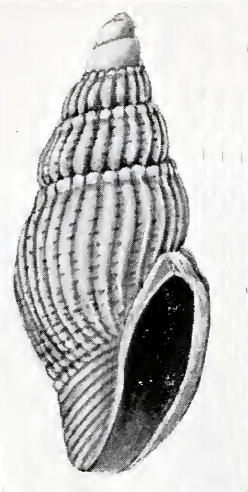
- Original image of a shell of Mitromorpha multicostata

Scientific classification
- Kingdom: Animalia
- Phylum: Mollusca
- Class: Gastropoda
- Subclass: Caenogastropoda
- Order: Neogastropoda
- Superfamily: Conoidea
- Family: Mitromorphidae
- Genus: Mitromorpha
- Species: M. multicostata

Binomial name
- Mitromorpha multicostata May, 1911

Synonyms
- Mitrithara multicostata (May, 1911); Mitromorpha (Mitrolumna) multicostata May, 1911

= Mitromorpha multicostata =

Species of gastropod

Mitromorpha multicostata is a species of sea snail, a marine gastropod mollusk in the family Mitromorphidae.

== Description ==
The length of the shell attains 4.3 mm, its diameter 2 mm.

(Original description) The solid, yellowish shell has an elongate oval shape. It contains five whorls, including a pointed protoconch of two smooth whorls. The spire whorls are convex. The suture is well impressed. The base of the shell is contracted. The aperture is elongate oval, not constricted into a siphonal canal. The outer lip is simple and convex in outline. The columella is slightly curved. The shell shows numerous straight rounded axial ribs that extend across the whorls, and over about two-thirds of the body whorl there are about 24 on the penultimate whorl. They are separated by deep grooves, which are narrower than the ribs. There is one distinct spiral groove or depression below the suture. Numerous faint spirals, which can scarcely be seen without a lens, cross the shell, and are most conspicuous in the grooves. They become much stronger on the base.

== Distribution ==
This marine species is endemic to Australia and occurs off Tasmania.
