= Mitromorpha grammatula =

Scientific classification
- Kingdom: Animalia
- Phylum: Mollusca
- Class: Gastropoda
- Subclass: Caenogastropoda
- Order: Neogastropoda
- Superfamily: Conoidea
- Family: Mitromorphidae
- Genus: Mitromorpha
- Species: M. grammatula

Binomial name
- Mitromorpha grammatula (Dall, 1927)

Synonyms
- Mitra grammatula Dall, 1927; Mitromorpha (Mitrolumna) grammatula Dall, 1927

Species of gastropod

Mitromorpha grammatula is a species of sea snail, a marine gastropod mollusk in the family Mitromorphidae.

== Description ==
The length of the shell attains 4.5 mm, its diameter 2.3 mm.

(Original description) The small shell has a short fusiform shape. It contains about five whorls with a minute smooth protoconch of a 1½ whorl. its color is a color pale brown, darker in the spiral interspaces which show in the aperture as dark lines. The suture is minutely channeled. The spiral sculpture consists of (on the penultimate whorl three, on the body whorl about a dozen) strong squarish cords with narrower interspaces, growing smaller toward the siphonal canal and covering the entire whorl. The cord in front of the suture is separated by a somewhat wider and deeper interspace from those in front of it. The axial sculpture consists of numerous equal regular narrow sulci, cutting the stronger spirals into squarish nodules but less evident on the base. The aperture is narrow. The columella shows two rather obscure plaits. The siphonal canal is hardly differentiated.

== Distribution ==
This species occurs in the Atlantic Ocean off Georgia, USA.
