= Mitromorpha engli =

Scientific classification
- Kingdom: Animalia
- Phylum: Mollusca
- Class: Gastropoda
- Subclass: Caenogastropoda
- Order: Neogastropoda
- Superfamily: Conoidea
- Family: Mitromorphidae
- Genus: Mitromorpha
- Species: M. engli

Binomial name
- Mitromorpha engli Mifsud, 2001

Synonyms
- Mitromorpha (Mitrolumna) engli Mifsud, 2001

Species of gastropod

Mitromorpha engli is a species of sea snail, a marine gastropod mollusk in the family Mitromorphidae. It is found around the Canary Islands. The length of the shell varies between 4 mm and 5 mm.
