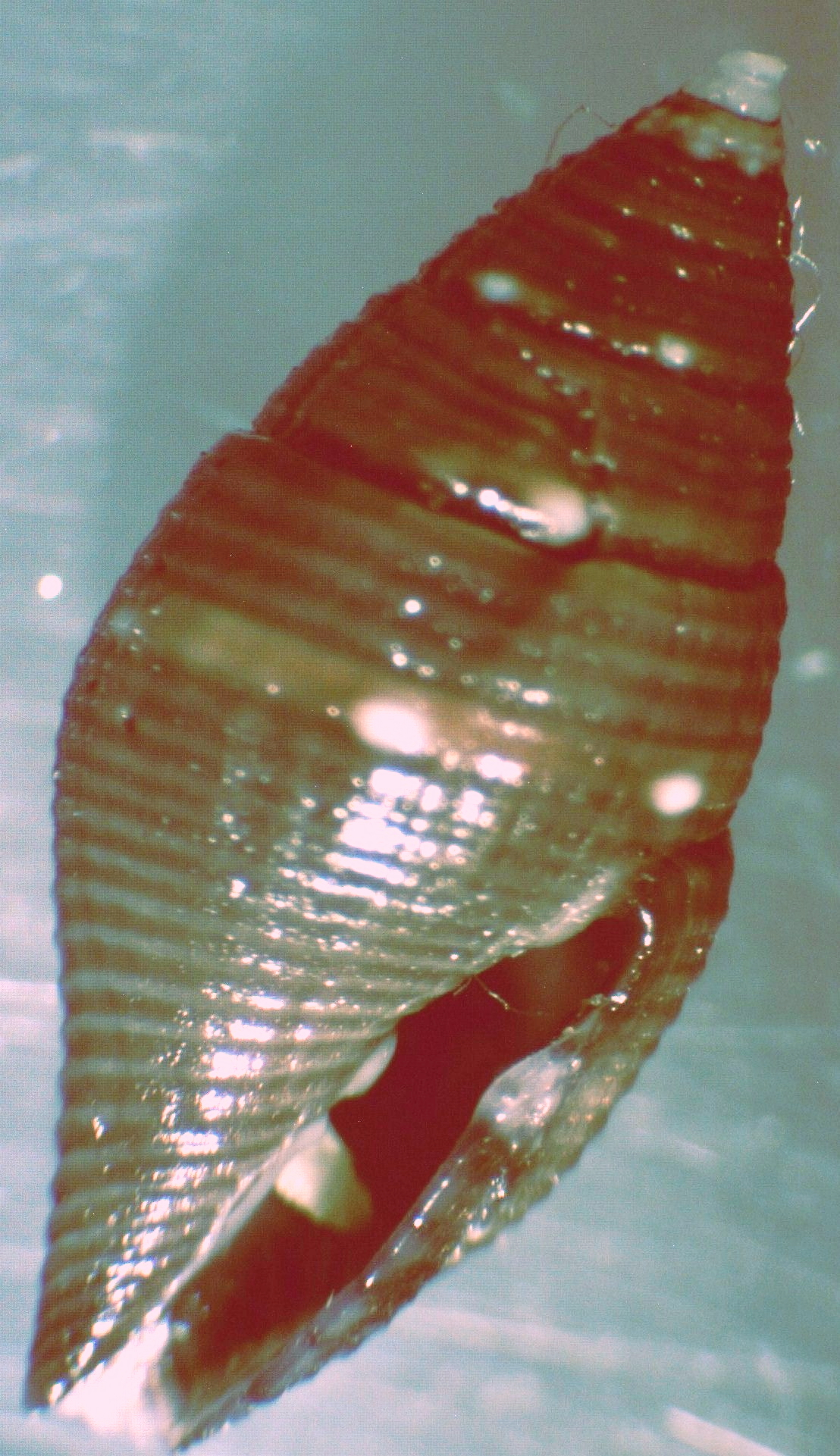
- Shell of Mitromorpha philippinensis

Scientific classification
- Kingdom: Animalia
- Phylum: Mollusca
- Class: Gastropoda
- Subclass: Caenogastropoda
- Order: Neogastropoda
- Superfamily: Conoidea
- Family: Mitromorphidae
- Genus: Mitromorpha
- Species: M. philippinensis

Binomial name
- Mitromorpha philippinensis Mifsud, 2001

Synonyms
- Mitromorpha (Mitrolumna) philippinensis Mifsud, 2001

= Mitromorpha philippinensis =

Species of gastropod

Mitromorpha philippinensis is a species of sea snail, a marine gastropod mollusk in the family Mitromorphidae.

== Description ==
The length of the shell varies between 7 mm and 11 mm.

== Distribution ==
This marine species occurs off the Philippines at a depth between 30 m and 35 m.
