= Mitromorpha sutherlandica =

Scientific classification
- Kingdom: Animalia
- Phylum: Mollusca
- Class: Gastropoda
- Subclass: Caenogastropoda
- Order: Neogastropoda
- Superfamily: Conoidea
- Family: Mitromorphidae
- Genus: Mitromorpha
- Species: M. sutherlandica

Binomial name
- Mitromorpha sutherlandica (Powell, 1942)

Extinct species of gastropod

Mitromorpha sutherlandica is an extinct species of sea snail, a marine gastropod mollusk in the family Mitromorphidae.

== Distribution ==
This extinct species is endemic to New Zealand.
