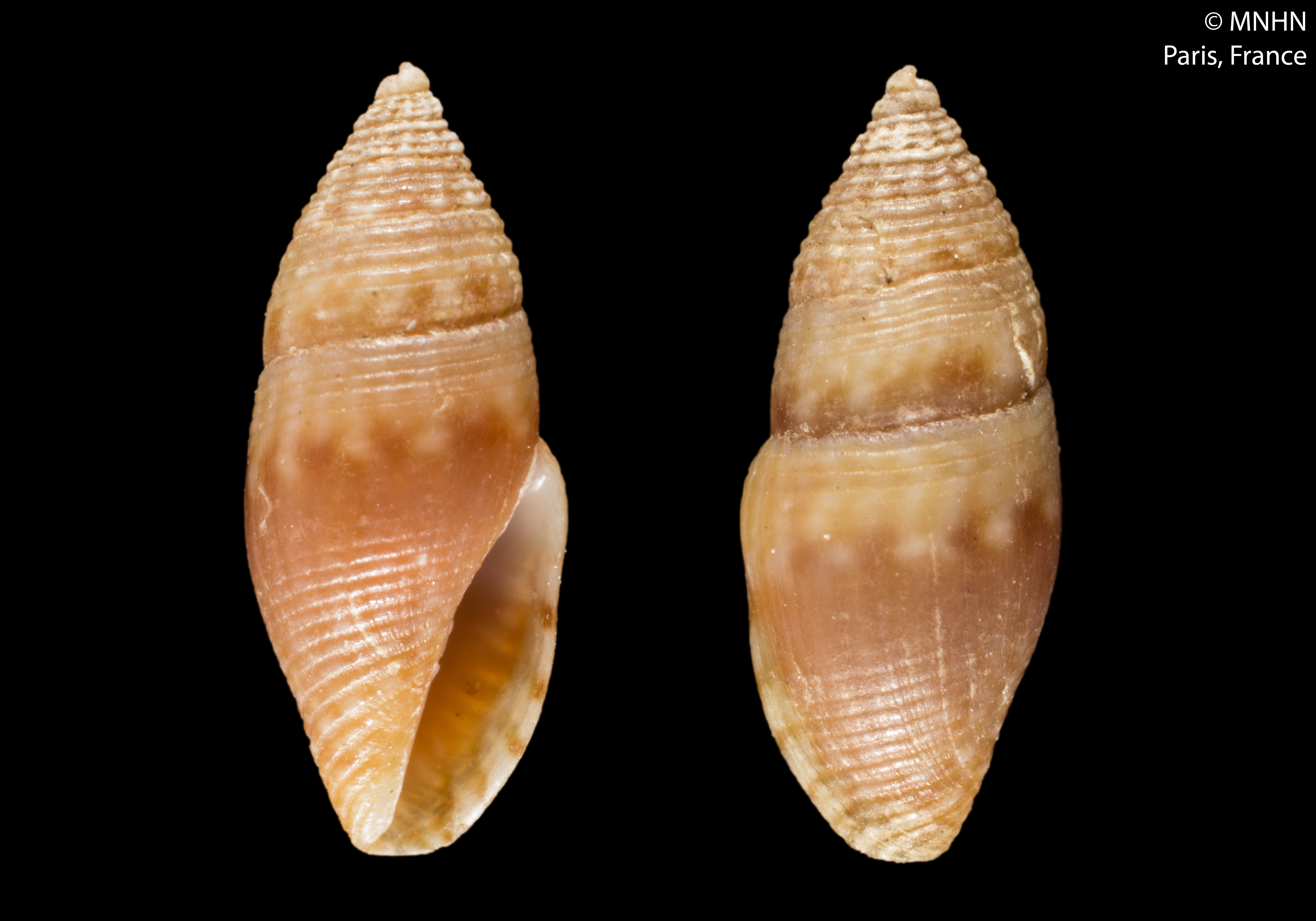

Scientific classification
- Kingdom: Animalia
- Phylum: Mollusca
- Class: Gastropoda
- Subclass: Caenogastropoda
- Order: Neogastropoda
- Superfamily: Conoidea
- Family: Mitromorphidae
- Genus: Mitromorpha
- Species: M. gofasi

Binomial name
- Mitromorpha gofasi Mifsud, 2001

Synonyms
- Mitromorpha (Mitrolumna) gofasi Mifsud, 2001

= Mitromorpha gofasi =

Species of gastropod

Mitromorpha gofasi is a species of sea snail, a marine gastropod mollusk in the family Mitromorphidae.

== Description ==
Mitromorpha gofasi is characterized by its small, elongated shell, which typically reaches between 6 mm and 8 mm in length. The shell has a smooth, glossy surface, often with delicate spiral or axial sculpturing, which helps in identifying it within the Mitromorphidae family. Its color can vary but often includes shades of white, cream, or light brown, sometimes with darker markings.

== Distribution ==
This marine species occurs off the Canary Islands.
