= Mitromorpha insolens =

Scientific classification
- Kingdom: Animalia
- Phylum: Mollusca
- Class: Gastropoda
- Subclass: Caenogastropoda
- Order: Neogastropoda
- Superfamily: Conoidea
- Family: Mitromorphidae
- Genus: Mitromorpha
- Species: M. insolens

Binomial name
- Mitromorpha insolens (Casey, 1904)

Synonyms
- Helenella insolens Casey, 1904

Species of gastropod

Mitromorpha insolens is a species of sea snail, a marine gastropod mollusk in the family Mitromorphidae.

== Description ==
The length of the shell attains 2.9 mm, its diameter 1.3 mm.

The very small shell has a pale and clear straw color throughout. The about fifteen ribs are separated by fully their own widths. They are much more nearly obliterated between the strong spirals than the latter are between the ribs.

== Distribution ==
This species occurs in the Atlantic Ocean off St. Helena.
