= Mitromorpha orcutti =

Scientific classification
- Kingdom: Animalia
- Phylum: Mollusca
- Class: Gastropoda
- Subclass: Caenogastropoda
- Order: Neogastropoda
- Family: Mitromorphidae
- Genus: Mitromorpha
- Species: M. orcutti

Binomial name
- Mitromorpha orcutti (Dall, 1920)

Synonyms
- Mitra orcutti Dall, 1920; Mitromorpha (Mitrolumna) orcutti (W.H. Dall, 1920)

Species of gastropod

Mitromorpha orcutti is a species of sea snail, a marine gastropod mollusk in the family Mitromorphidae.

== Description ==
The length of the shell attains 5.6 mm, its diameter 2.7 mm.

(Original description) The small, white shell is mottled with yellow brown. It contains five whorls of which the white smooth blunt protoconch comprises one. The suture is distinct. The whorls are moderately convex. The spiral sculpture consists of (between the sutures four, on the body whorl about a dozen) strong rounded close-set cords closely undulated behind the periphery by numerous low narrow axial riblets with about equal interspaces. The cords in front of the periphery are not undulated, but extend to the end of the siphonal canal. There are also very fine axial striae in the interspaces. The aperture is narrow and simple. The columella shows two plaits. The siphonal canal is hardly differentiated.

== Distribution ==
This marine species occurs off California, USA.
