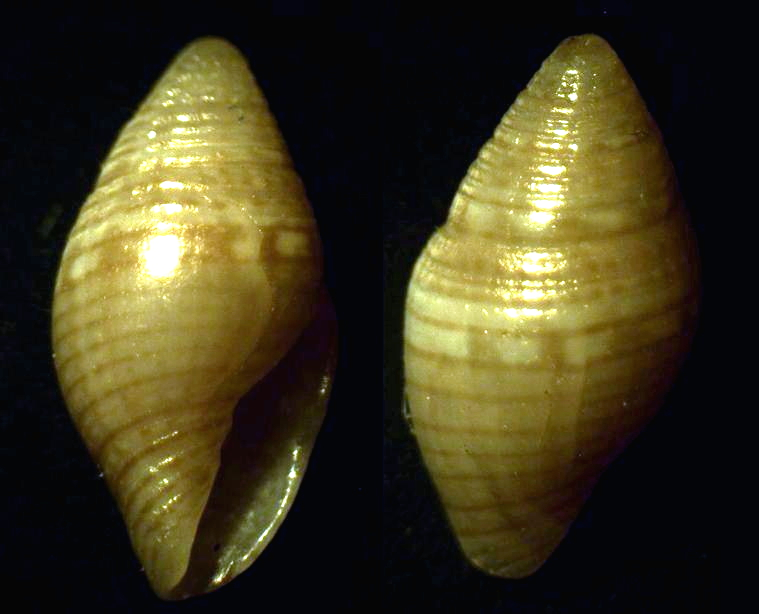
- Shells of Mitromorpha wilhelminae

Scientific classification
- Kingdom: Animalia
- Phylum: Mollusca
- Class: Gastropoda
- Subclass: Caenogastropoda
- Order: Neogastropoda
- Family: Mitromorphidae
- Genus: Mitromorpha
- Species: M. wilhelminae

Binomial name
- Mitromorpha wilhelminae (van Aartsen, Menkhorst & Gittenberger, 1984)

Synonyms
- Mitrolumna wilhelminae Aartsen et al., 1984; Mitromorpha (Mitrolumna) wilhelminae van Aartsen, Menkhorst & Gittenberger, 1984

= Mitromorpha wilhelminae =

Species of gastropod

Mitromorpha wilhelminae is a species of minute sea snail, a marine gastropod mollusk or micromollusk in the family Mitromorphidae.

== Description ==
The length of the shell varies between 6 mm and 9 mm.

== Distribution ==
This marine species occurs in the Strait of Gibraltar; off Southern Spain and Morocco.
