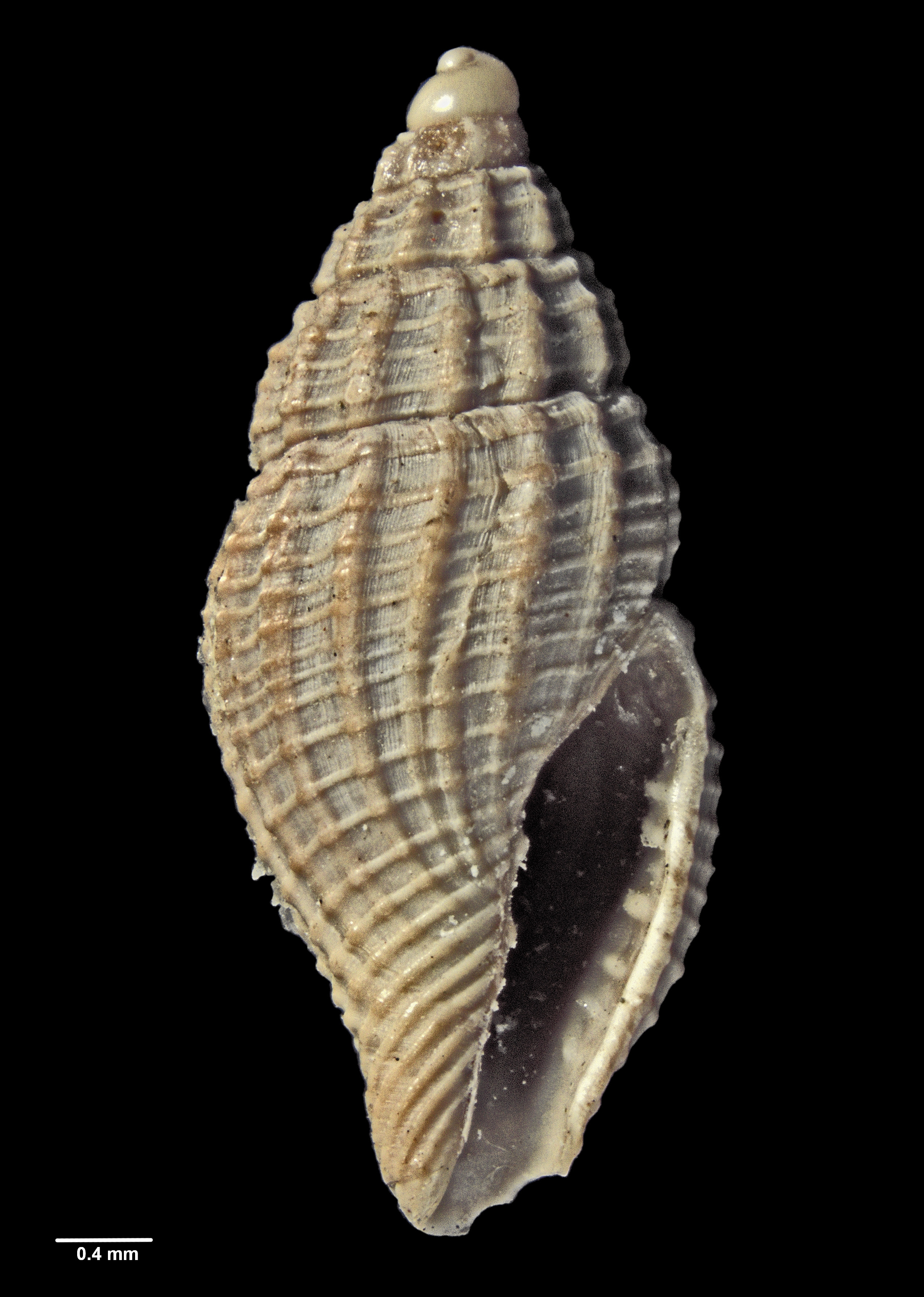
- Holotype from Auckland War Memorial Museum

Scientific classification
- Kingdom: Animalia
- Phylum: Mollusca
- Class: Gastropoda
- Subclass: Caenogastropoda
- Order: Neogastropoda
- Family: Mitromorphidae
- Genus: Mitromorpha
- Species: †M. fenestrata

Binomial name
- †Mitromorpha fenestrata (A. W. B. Powell, 1944)

Synonyms
- Mitrithara fenestrata A. W. B. Powell, 1944

= Mitromorpha fenestrata =

Mitromorpha fenestrata Temporal range: middle Miocene

Extinct species of gastropod

Mitromorpha fenestrata is an extinct species of sea snail, a marine gastropod mollusc in the family Mitromorphidae. Fossils of the species date to the middle Miocene, and occurs in the strata of the Port Phillip Basin of Victoria, Australia.

== Description ==
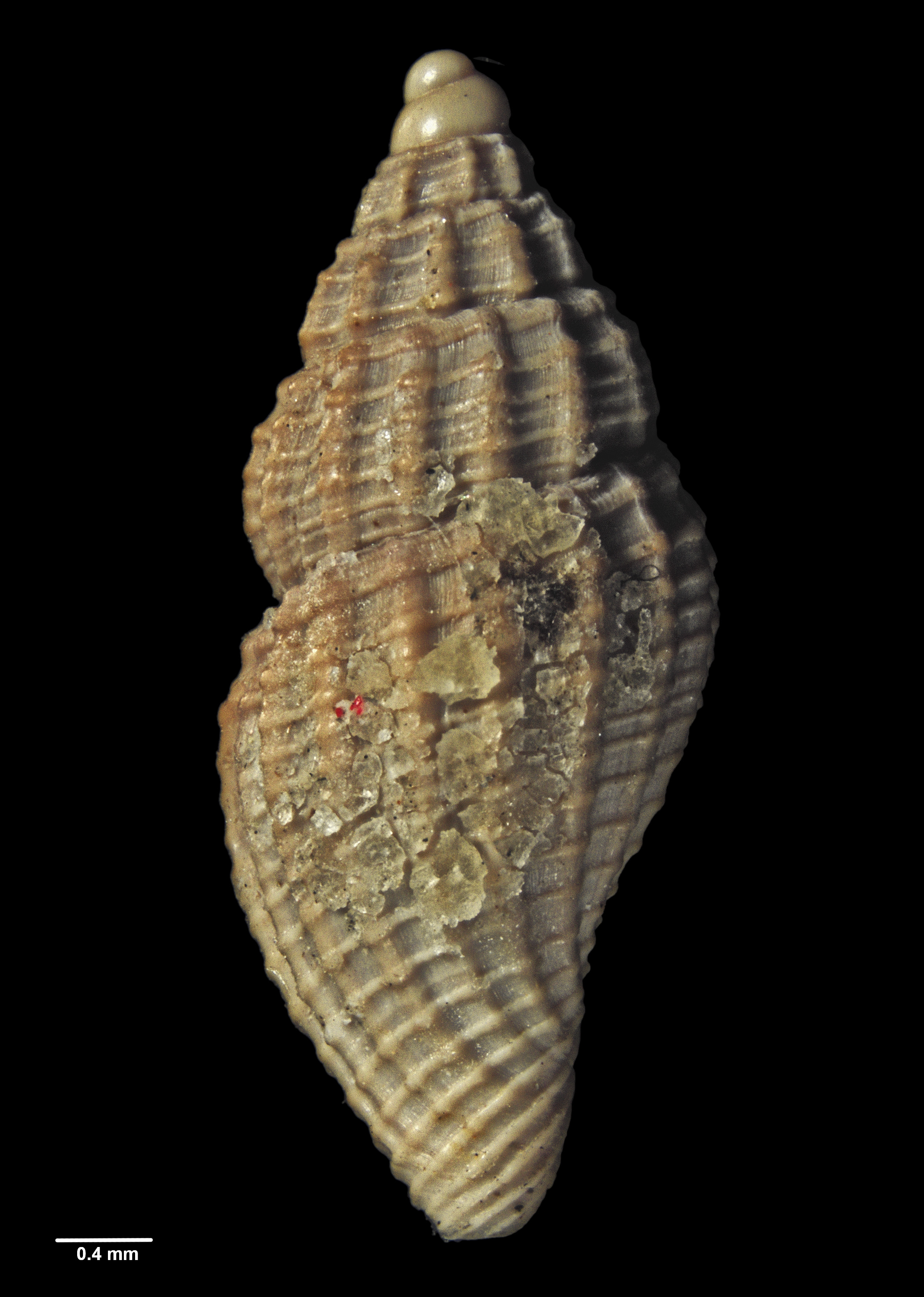
Reverse view of holotype

In the original description, Powell described the species as follows:

Shell small, very similar to daphnelloides, but with a reversal of the sculptural plan, the spirals being subsidiary to strongly developed axials. Biconic, height of aperture half that of shell. Spiral sculpture of sharply raised narrow cords, 4 on spire-whorls and 20 on body-whorl, the last 8 closely spaced on the anterior end, elsewhere with interspaces from 2 to 4 times width of cords. On the spire the first cord submargins the suture, after which there is a broad, free space on the shoulder or sinus area. Axials strong, narrowly rounded, 15 per whorl. Aperture with two distinct plaits and six short lirations within the outer lip.

The holotype of the species measures 6 mm (0.24 in) in height and 2.5 mm (0.098 in) in diameter.

== Taxonomy ==
The species was first described by A.W.B. Powell in 1944, using the name Mitrithara fenestrata. Thomas A. Darragh recombined the species, moving it to the genus Mitromorpha in 2024. The holotype was collected from Fossil Beach, Balcombe Bay, Victoria, at an unknown date prior to 1944, and is held by the Auckland War Memorial Museum.

== Distribution ==
This extinct marine species dates to the middle Miocene, and occurs in the strata of the Port Phillip Basin of Victoria, Australia, from the Gellibrand Formation.
