= Mitromorpha diaoyuensis =

Scientific classification
- Kingdom: Animalia
- Phylum: Mollusca
- Class: Gastropoda
- Subclass: Caenogastropoda
- Order: Neogastropoda
- Superfamily: Conoidea
- Family: Mitromorphidae
- Genus: Mitromorpha
- Species: M. diaoyuensis

Binomial name
- Mitromorpha diaoyuensis Mifsud, 2013

Synonyms
- Mitromorpha (Mitrolumna) diaoyuensis Mifsud, 2013

Species of gastropod

Mitromorpha diaoyuensis is a species of sea snail, a marine gastropod mollusk in the family Mitromorphidae.

== Description ==
The length of the shell attains 8 mm.

== Distribution ==
This species occurs off the Diaoyu (Senkalu) Islands, East China Sea.
