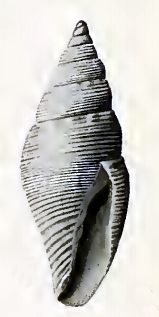
- Original image of a shell of Mitromorpha columnaria

Scientific classification
- Kingdom: Animalia
- Phylum: Mollusca
- Class: Gastropoda
- Subclass: Caenogastropoda
- Order: Neogastropoda
- Superfamily: Conoidea
- Family: Mitromorphidae
- Genus: Mitromorpha
- Species: M. columnaria

Binomial name
- Mitromorpha columnaria (Hedley, 1922)

Synonyms
- Mitrithara columnaria Hedley, 1922

= Mitromorpha columnaria =

Species of gastropod

Mitromorpha columnaria is a species of sea snail, a marine gastropod mollusk in the family Mitromorphidae.

== Description ==
The length of the shell attains 13 mm, its diameter 5 mm.

(Original description) The shell is rather large and thin, regularly fusiform. Its colour is a pale yellow-orange, with a zone of alternate brown and buff beneath the suture. It contains 8 whorls, of which three are included in the protoconch. The suture is impressed. Radials in the sculpture are entirely absent. Spirals amount to thirty two on the body whorl and to ten on the penultimate whorl. The summit of the whorl is crowned by a strong cord followed by a corresponding sulcus, thence the spirals diminish to the periphery, where they are small and crowded, with another change the base and aperture are occupied by eight broad and widely spaced spirals. The outer lip incomplete in the specimen examined. The columella has two low folds.

== Distribution ==
This species is endemic to Australia and occurs off Tasmania.
