= Mitromorpha santosi =

Scientific classification
- Kingdom: Animalia
- Phylum: Mollusca
- Class: Gastropoda
- Subclass: Caenogastropoda
- Order: Neogastropoda
- Superfamily: Conoidea
- Family: Mitromorphidae
- Genus: Mitromorpha
- Species: M. santosi

Binomial name
- Mitromorpha santosi S. Lima, Barros & Francisco, 2010

Species of gastropod

Mitromorpha santosi is a species of sea snail, a marine gastropod mollusk in the family Mitromorphidae.

== Distribution ==
This deep-sea species occurs in the Atlantic Ocean off Brazil
