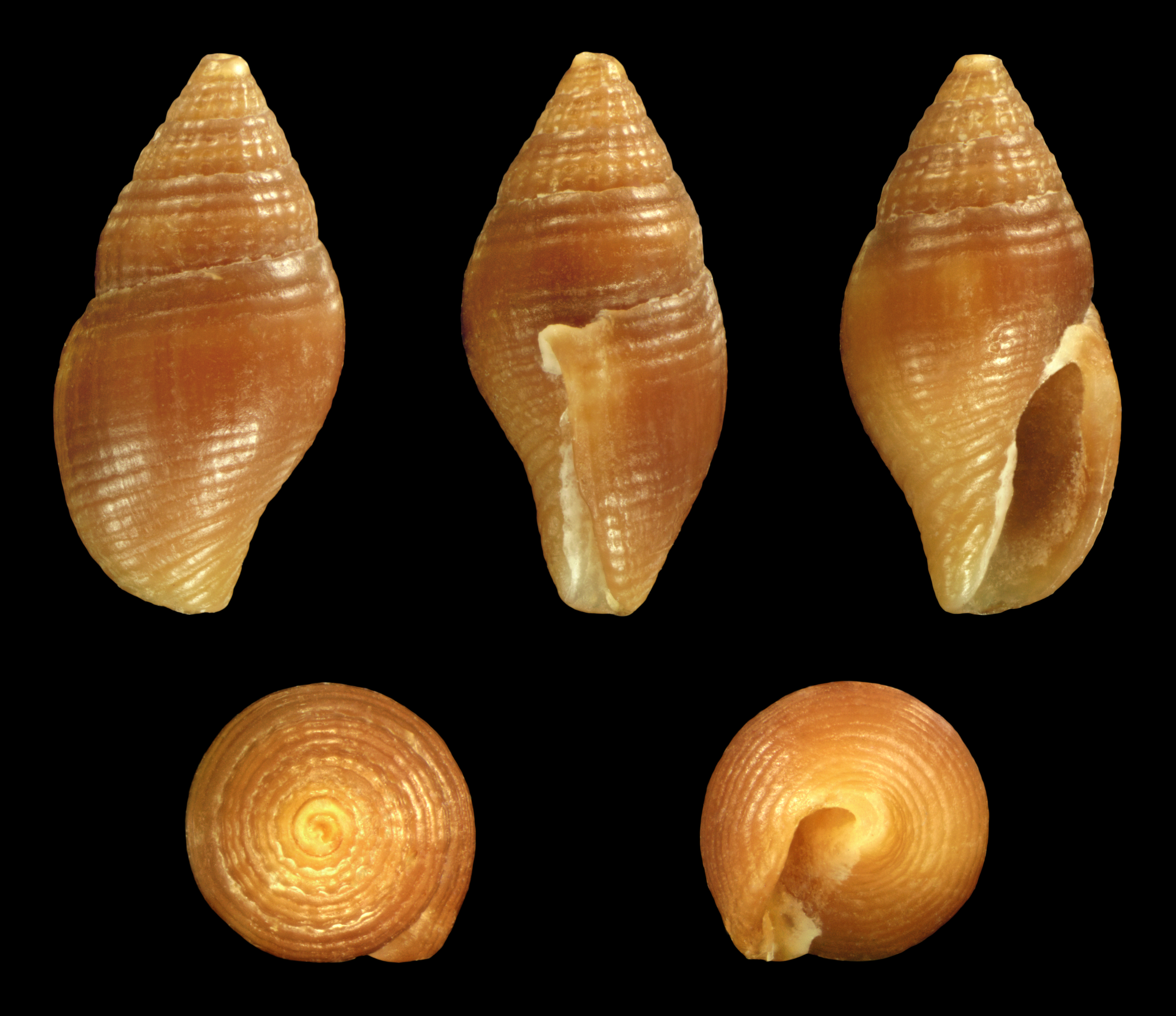
- Shell of Mitromorpha columbellaria

Scientific classification
- Kingdom: Animalia
- Phylum: Mollusca
- Class: Gastropoda
- Subclass: Caenogastropoda
- Order: Neogastropoda
- Superfamily: Conoidea
- Family: Mitromorphidae
- Genus: Mitromorpha
- Species: M. columbellaria

Binomial name
- Mitromorpha columbellaria (Scacchi, 1836)

Synonyms
- Columbella greci Philippi, 1844 (dubious synonym); Columbella greci var. granulosa Monterosato, 1878; Columbella greci var. lactea Monterosato, 1878; Columbella greci var. minor Monterosato, 1878; Columbella greci var. unifasciata Monterosato, 1878; Mitra clandestina Reeve, 1845 (dubious synonym); Mitra columbellaria Scacchi, 1836 (original combination); Mitra leontocroma Brusina, 1866; Mitra obsoleta Philippi, 1836 (invalid: junior homonym of Mitra obsoleta Brocchi, 1814); Mitrolumna algeriana Pallary, 1900; Mitrolumna granulosa Locard, 1886; Mitrolumna major Locard, 1886; Mitrolumna olivoidea var. granulosa Bucquoy, Dautzenberg & Dollfus, 1883; Mitrolumna olivoidea var. lactea Bucquoy, Dautzenberg & Dollfus, 1883; Mitrolumna olivoidea var. major Bucquoy, Dautzenberg & Dollfus, 1883; Mitrolumna olivoidea var. minor Bucquoy, Dautzenberg & Dollfus, 1883; Mitromorpha (Mitrolumna) columbellaria (Scacchi, 1836)· accepted, alternate representation; Mitromorpha mediterranea Mifsud, 2001

= Mitromorpha columbellaria =

Species of gastropod

Mitromorpha columbellaria is a species of sea snail, a marine gastropod mollusk in the family Mitromorphidae.

== Description ==
The Mitromorpha columbellaria has a brownish-tan, spiral shell. Its common size is 6mm.

== Distribution ==
This species of sea snail is native to Spain, particularly in the cities of Granada and Punta de la Mona; also off Italy and Algeria
