= Mitromorpha iki =

Scientific classification
- Kingdom: Animalia
- Phylum: Mollusca
- Class: Gastropoda
- Subclass: Caenogastropoda
- Order: Neogastropoda
- Superfamily: Conoidea
- Family: Mitromorphidae
- Genus: Mitromorpha
- Species: M. iki

Binomial name
- Mitromorpha iki (Kay, 1979)

Synonyms
- Mitrolumna iki Kay, 1979 (original combination)

Species of gastropod

Mitromorpha iki is a species of sea snail, a marine gastropod mollusk in the family Mitromorphidae.

== Distribution ==
This marine species was found off Hawaii
