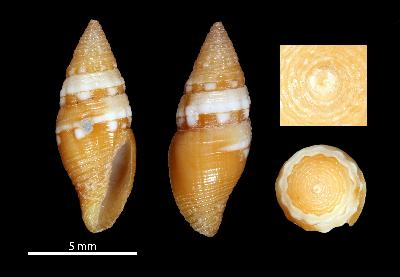
- Shells of Mitromorpha candeopontis (paratype in the MNHN, Paris)

Scientific classification
- Kingdom: Animalia
- Phylum: Mollusca
- Class: Gastropoda
- Subclass: Caenogastropoda
- Order: Neogastropoda
- Superfamily: Conoidea
- Family: Mitromorphidae
- Genus: Mitromorpha
- Species: M. candeopontis

Binomial name
- Mitromorpha candeopontis Chino & Stahlschmidt, 2009

= Mitromorpha candeopontis =

Species of gastropod

Mitromorpha candeopontis is a species of sea snail, a marine gastropod mollusk in the family Mitromorphidae.

== Description ==
The length of the shell varies between 9 mm and 12.5 mm.

== Distribution ==
This marine species occurs off the Philippines and off New Caledonia.
