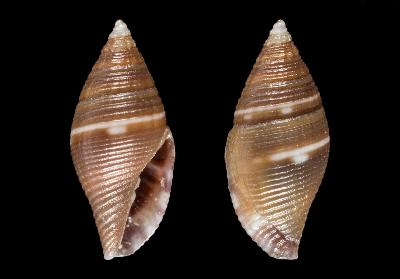
- Shell of Mitromorpha unilineata (holotype at MNHN, Paris)

Scientific classification
- Kingdom: Animalia
- Phylum: Mollusca
- Class: Gastropoda
- Subclass: Caenogastropoda
- Order: Neogastropoda
- Family: Mitromorphidae
- Genus: Mitromorpha
- Species: M. unilineata

Binomial name
- Mitromorpha unilineata Chino & Stahlschmidt, 2014

= Mitromorpha unilineata =

Species of gastropod

Mitromorpha unilineata is a species of sea snail, a marine gastropod mollusk in the family Mitromorphidae.

== Distribution ==
This marine species occurs off the Philippines and Indonesia
