= Mitromorpha platacme =

Scientific classification
- Kingdom: Animalia
- Phylum: Mollusca
- Class: Gastropoda
- Subclass: Caenogastropoda
- Order: Neogastropoda
- Superfamily: Conoidea
- Family: Mitromorphidae
- Genus: Mitromorpha
- Species: M. platacme

Binomial name
- Mitromorpha platacme Kilburn, 1986

Synonyms
- Mitromorpha (Mitrolumna) platacme Kilburn, 1986

Species of gastropod

Mitromorpha platacme is a species of sea snail, a marine gastropod mollusk in the family Mitromorphidae.

== Description ==
The length of the shell attains 5.1 mm.

== Distribution ==
This marine species occurs off West Transkei, South Africa.
