= Mitromorpha tenuilirata =

Scientific classification
- Kingdom: Animalia
- Phylum: Mollusca
- Class: Gastropoda
- Subclass: Caenogastropoda
- Order: Neogastropoda
- Superfamily: Conoidea
- Family: Mitromorphidae
- Genus: Mitromorpha
- Species: M. tenuilirata

Binomial name
- Mitromorpha tenuilirata Kilburn, 1986

Synonyms
- Mitromorpha (Mitrolumna) tenuilirata Kilburn, 1986

Species of gastropod

Mitromorpha tenuilirata is a species of sea snail, a marine gastropod mollusk in the family Mitromorphidae.

== Description ==
The length of the shell attains 5.5 mm.

== Distribution ==
This marine species occurs off Transkei and KwaZulu-Natal, South Africa.
