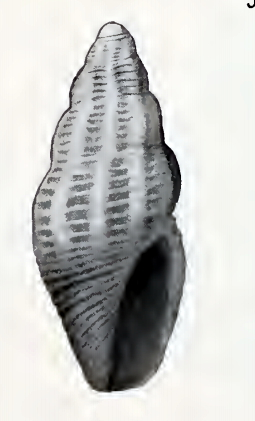
- Original image of a shell of Mitromorpha herilda

Scientific classification
- Kingdom: Animalia
- Phylum: Mollusca
- Class: Gastropoda
- Subclass: Caenogastropoda
- Order: Neogastropoda
- Superfamily: Conoidea
- Family: Mitromorphidae
- Genus: Mitromorpha
- Species: M. herilda

Binomial name
- Mitromorpha herilda (Bartsch, 1915)

Synonyms
- Mangilia herilda Bartsch, 1915

= Mitromorpha herilda =

Species of gastropod

Mitromorpha herilda is a species of sea snail, a marine gastropod mollusk in the family Mitromorphidae.

== Description ==
The length of the shell attains 7.4 mm, its diameter 3.1 mm.

(Original description) The shell is small and white. The protoconch consists of at least one whorl, which appears to be smooth. (In our specimens this is somewhat worn.) The five post-nuclear whorls are well rounded and separated by a well impressed suture. They are marked by strong, low, rounded, retractive axial ribs, which are not quite as broad as the spaces that separate them. Of these ribs, about 12 occur upon all the whorls. These ribs disappear shortly after passing over the periphery of the base. In addition to the axial ribs, the surface of the shell is marked by numerous, fine lines of growth. The spiral sculpture consists of well-developed cords, which are about half as wide as the spaces that separate them. Of these cords, 4 occur between the sutures on the first whorl, 5 upon the second, 6 upon the third and 7 upon the penultimate whorl. The base of the shell is marked by about 15 spiral cords, which equal those on the spire in strength and spacing. The aperture is moderately large. The posterior angle is obtuse, scarcely channeled. The outer lip is thin, rendered slightly sinuous by the spiral cords on the outside. The columella and parietal wall are covered with a thin callus.

== Distribution ==
This marine species occurs off the Eastern Cape, South Africa.
