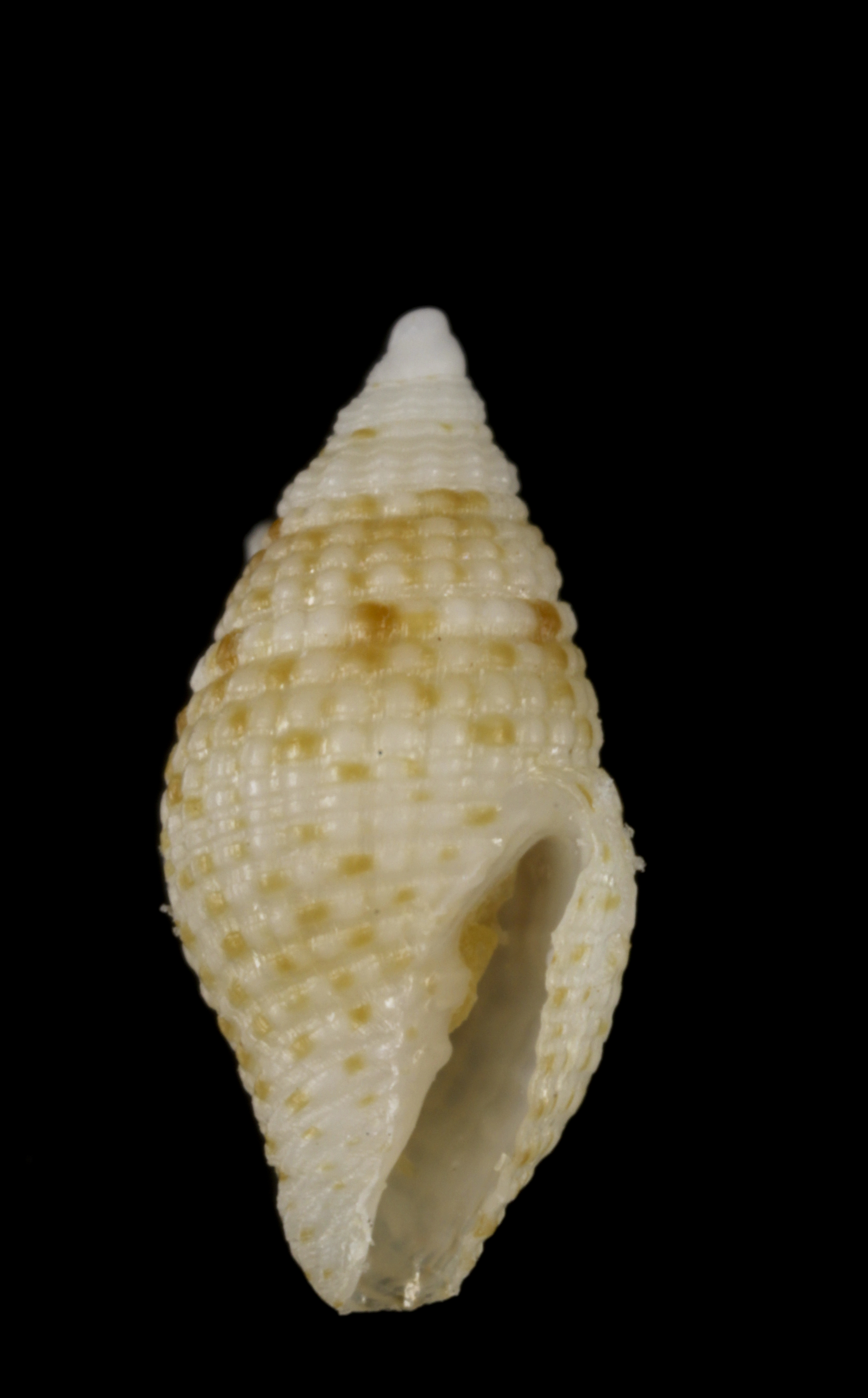
- Shell of Mitromorpha haycocki (specimen at MNHN, Paris)

Scientific classification
- Kingdom: Animalia
- Phylum: Mollusca
- Class: Gastropoda
- Subclass: Caenogastropoda
- Order: Neogastropoda
- Superfamily: Conoidea
- Family: Mitromorphidae
- Genus: Mitromorpha
- Species: M. haycocki

Binomial name
- Mitromorpha haycocki (Dall & Bartsch, 1911)

Synonyms
- Mitra haycocki Dall & Bartsch, 1911; Mitrolumna haycocki (Dall & Bartsch, 1911); Mitromorpha (Mitrolumna) haycocki (Dall & Bartsch, 1911)

= Mitromorpha haycocki =

Species of gastropod

Mitromorpha haycocki is a species of sea snail, a marine gastropod mollusk in the family Mitromorphidae.

== Description ==
The length of the shell attains 5.5 mm, its diameter 2.5 mm.

(Original description) The small, stout shell has a short-fusiform shape. It is, white, flecked or clouded on the prominences of the sculpture with pale yellow-brown. It contains about five whorls. The protoconch is white, blunt, polished. The later whorls show, between the sutures, four subequal spiral nodulous cords with deep narrower interspaces. The cord in front of the suture is slightly more prominent than the others. On the body whorl there are about fifteen spiral cords which are crossed by about twenty axial, incised, equally spaced lines, the segments of the cords thus formed being convexly nodulous.;Toward the aperture the axial lines become feebler or obsolete. The aperture is short and rather narrow with about six spiral lirations inside the outer lip which is simple and not reflected and hardly thickened. On the columella there are two strong plaits, rather deep within the aperture. The siphonal canal is short and not very deep, with hardly any siphonal fasciole.

== Distribution ==
This marine species occurs in the Caribbean Sea off Curaçao, Guadeloupe, French Guiana and in the Atlantic Ocean off Bermuda
