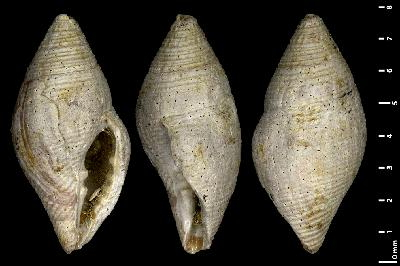
- Shells of † Mitromorpha panaulax (syntype in the MNHN, Paris)

Scientific classification
- Kingdom: Animalia
- Phylum: Mollusca
- Class: Gastropoda
- Subclass: Caenogastropoda
- Order: Neogastropoda
- Superfamily: Conoidea
- Family: Mitromorphidae
- Genus: Mitromorpha
- Species: M. panaulax

Binomial name
- Mitromorpha panaulax Cossmann, 1901

Synonyms
- † Mitromorpha (Mitrolumna) panaulax Cossmann, 1901 alternative representation

= Mitromorpha panaulax =

Extinct species of gastropod

Mitromorpha panaulax is an extinct species of sea snail, a marine gastropod mollusk in the family Mitromorphidae.

== Description ==
The length of the shell attains 9 mm, its diameter 4 mm.

(Original description in French) The small shell is subcylindrical, resembling a small, elongated cone. The spire is short and pointed, with a smooth, rounded apex. The shell consists of six or seven narrow, flat whorls separated by indistinct sutures. These whorls are adorned with five closely spaced spiral threads. The body whorl is large and rounded, and the base of the shell is gently sloping. The aperture is narrow and elongated, with a thickened, arched lip. The columella is nearly straight and bears two prominent folds.

== Distribution ==
This extinct marine species was found in Pliocene strata in Loire-Atlantique, France.
