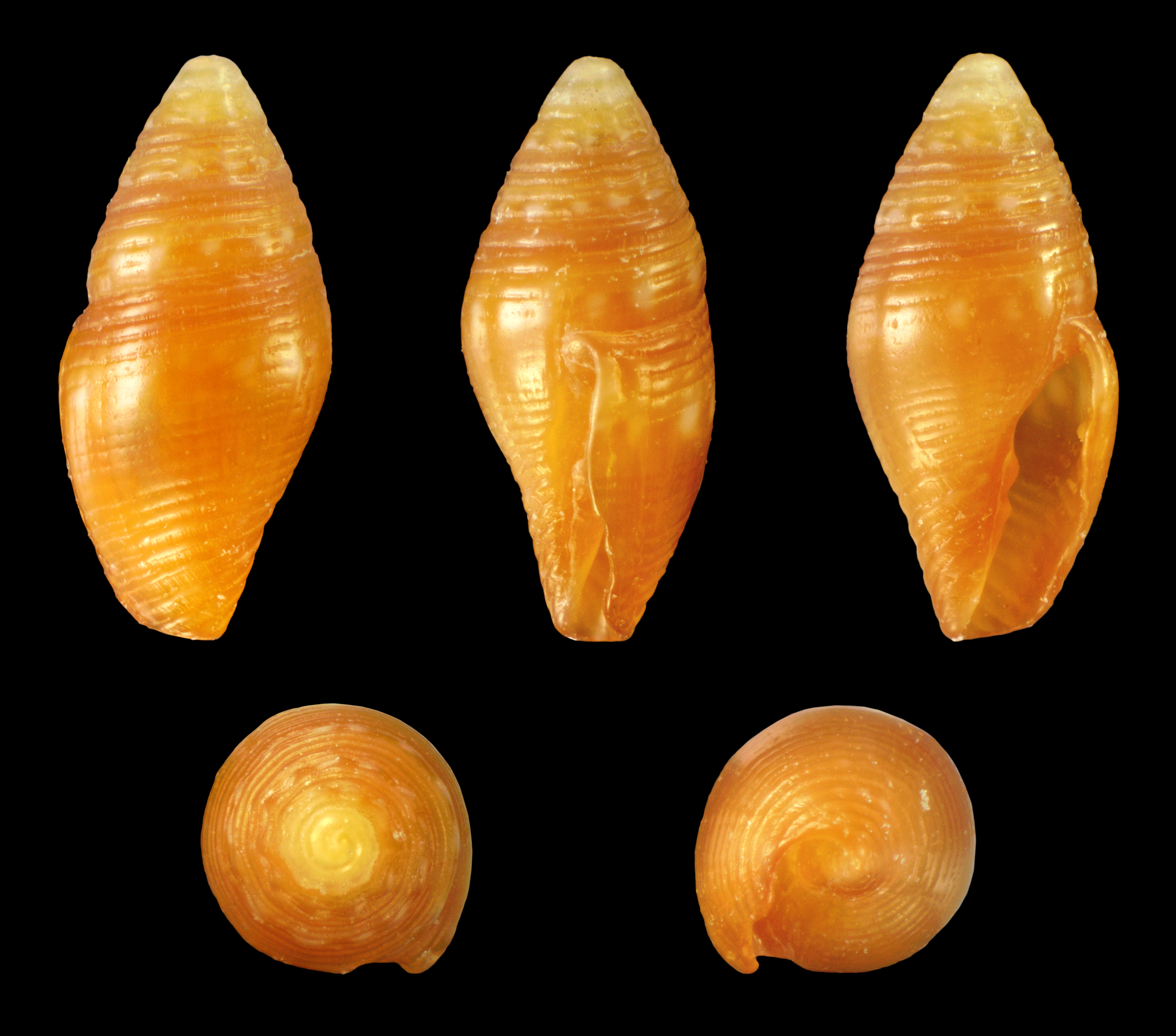
- Mitromorpha canariensis shell

Scientific classification
- Kingdom: Animalia
- Phylum: Mollusca
- Class: Gastropoda
- Subclass: Caenogastropoda
- Order: Neogastropoda
- Superfamily: Conoidea
- Family: Mitromorphidae
- Genus: Mitromorpha
- Species: M. canariensis

Binomial name
- Mitromorpha canariensis Mifsud, 2001

Synonyms
- Mitromorpha (Mitrolumna) canariensis Mifsud, 2001

= Mitromorpha canariensis =

Species of gastropod

Mitromorpha canariensis is a species of sea snail, a marine gastropod mollusk in the family Mitromorphidae.

== Description ==
The length of the shell varies between 4 mm and 5 mm.

== Distribution ==
This marine species occurs off the Canary Islands.
