= Mitromorpha granum =

Scientific classification
- Kingdom: Animalia
- Phylum: Mollusca
- Class: Gastropoda
- Subclass: Caenogastropoda
- Order: Neogastropoda
- Superfamily: Conoidea
- Family: Mitromorphidae
- Genus: Mitromorpha
- Species: M. granum

Binomial name
- Mitromorpha granum (Marwick, 1928)

Synonyms
- † Mitrithara granum J .Marwick, 1928 (original combination)

Extinct species of gastropod

Mitromorpha granum is an extinct species of sea snail, a marine gastropod mollusk in the family Mitromorphidae.

== Description ==
The length of the shell attains 8 mm (0.31 in), its diameter 4 mm (0.16 in).

== Distribution ==
This extinct species is endemic to New Zealand and was found off the Whenuaturu Peninsula.
