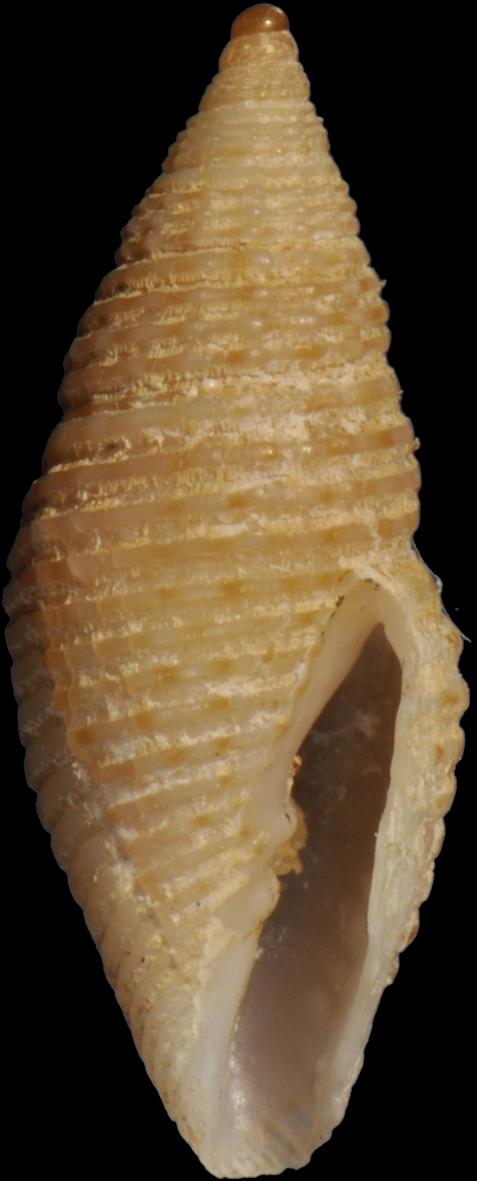
- Shell of Mitromorpha biplicata (specimen at MNHN, Paris)

Scientific classification
- Kingdom: Animalia
- Phylum: Mollusca
- Class: Gastropoda
- Subclass: Caenogastropoda
- Order: Neogastropoda
- Superfamily: Conoidea
- Family: Mitromorphidae
- Genus: Mitromorpha
- Species: M. biplicata

Binomial name
- Mitromorpha biplicata Dall, 1889

Synonyms
- Mitrolumna biplicata (Dall, 1889); Mitromorpha (Mitrolumna) biplicata W.H. Dall, 1889

= Mitromorpha biplicata =

Species of gastropod

Mitromorpha biplicata is a species of sea snail, a marine gastropod mollusk in the family Mitromorphidae.

== Description ==
The length of the shell varies between 4 mm and 8 mm.

(Original description) The small shell is biconic and cancellated. It is yellowish or whitish or with brown flammules. The protoconch is glassy, white, globose and consists of 1½ whorls. The five or six other whorls are hardly rounded. The sculpture consists of about (on the body whorl) sixteen spiral squarish riblets with about equal interspaces, in which near the aperture of the adult a fine intercalary thread appears. The spiral sculpture is crossed by incremental lines and numerous faint rounded transverse ribs which go nearly across the whorl, but which are chiefly evident through the rounded waves they form on the spiral riblets, especially behind the periphery of the whorls. The suture is hardly distinguishable. The aperture is narrow. The outer lip lis irate within, a little patulous. The inner lip is plain, with two strong plications near its middle, the posterior the largest.

None of the specimens had completed the thickening of the outer lip and the glazing of the columella which mark the adult state, but several were very near it. The surface of the shell is glossy except for the incremental lines.

== Distribution ==
This species occurs in the Atlantic Ocean from Georgia to Barbados and Guadeloupe at depths between 10 m and 805 m; it is also recorded from Brazil.
