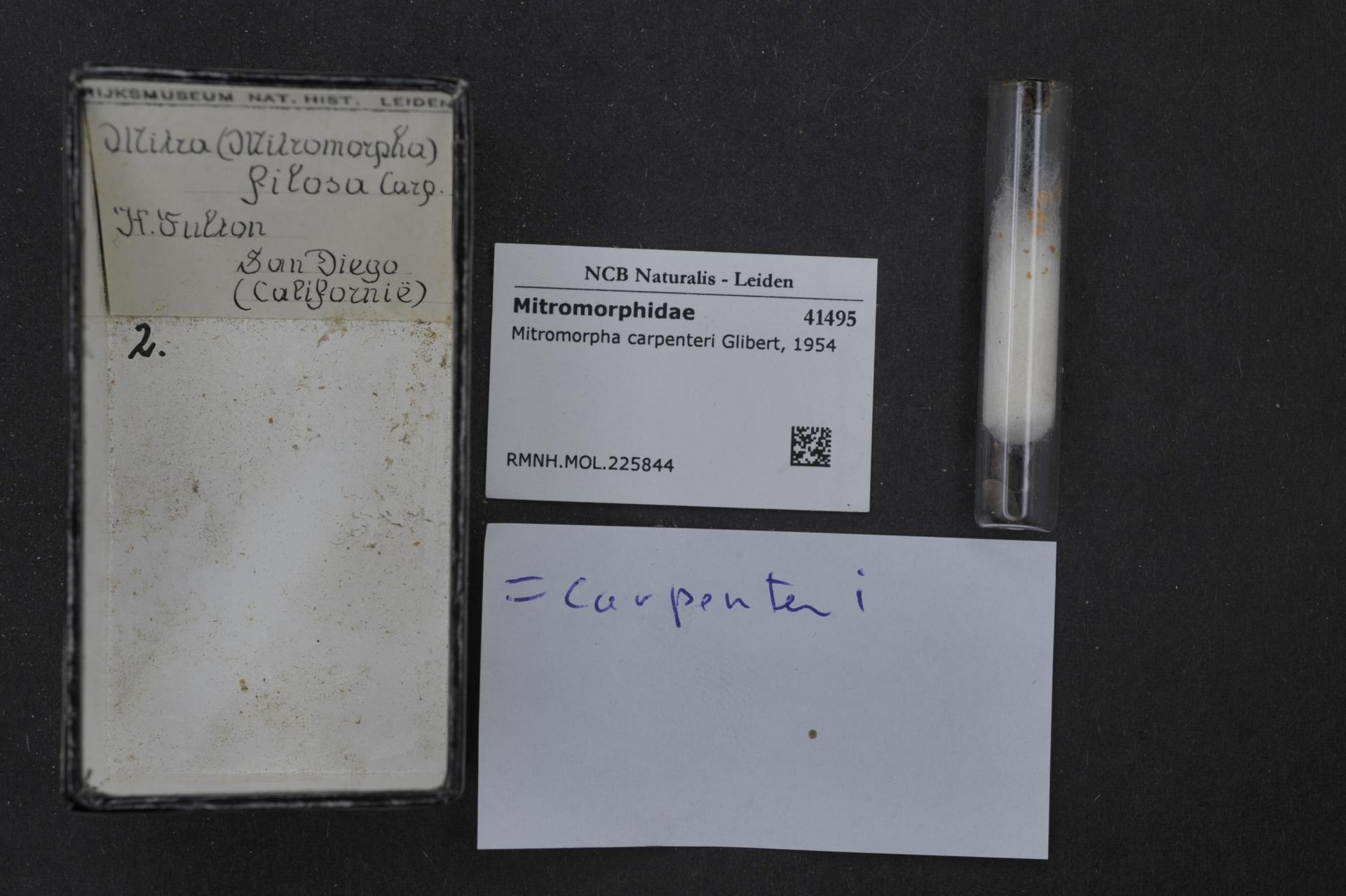

Scientific classification
- Kingdom: Animalia
- Phylum: Mollusca
- Class: Gastropoda
- Subclass: Caenogastropoda
- Order: Neogastropoda
- Superfamily: Conoidea
- Family: Mitromorphidae
- Genus: Mitromorpha
- Species: M. carpenteri

Binomial name
- Mitromorpha carpenteri Glibert, 1954

Synonyms
- Daphnella filosa Carpenter, 1864 (Secondary junior homonym of Columbella filosa Dujardin, 1837; Mitromorpha carpenteri is a replacement name); Mitra (Mitromorpha) filosa (Carpenter, 1864); † Mitromorpha filosa (Carpenter, 1864)

= Mitromorpha carpenteri =

Species of gastropod

Mitromorpha carpenteri, common name the filose turrid, is a species of sea snail, a marine gastropod mollusk in the family Mitromorphidae.

== Description ==
Mitromorpha shells are of small size with a maximum length of ca.10 mm. Generally, their sculpture consists of spiral cords. The adult mitromorpha develops two columellar folds in which the posterior is often stronger.

== Distribution ==
This species occurs in the Pacific Ocean off Ecuador and the Galapagos Islands. Fossils have been found in Quaternary striata of Mexico and California, USA; age range : 2.588 to 0.012 Ma.
