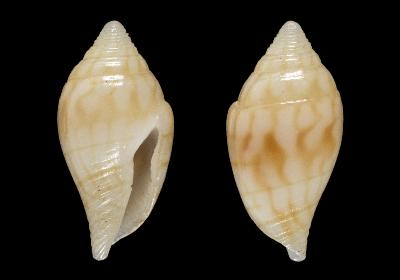
- Shell of Mitromorpha pinguis (syntype at MNHN, Paris)

Scientific classification
- Kingdom: Animalia
- Phylum: Mollusca
- Class: Gastropoda
- Subclass: Caenogastropoda
- Order: Neogastropoda
- Superfamily: Conoidea
- Family: Mitromorphidae
- Genus: Mitromorpha
- Species: M. pinguis

Binomial name
- Mitromorpha pinguis (Hervier, 1899)

Synonyms
- Anarithma pinguis (Hervier, 1899) Columbella pinguis Hervier, 1899 (original combination)

= Mitromorpha pinguis =

Species of gastropod

Mitromorpha pinguis is a species of sea snail, a marine gastropod mollusk in the family Mitromorphidae.

== Description ==
The length of the shell attains 8 mm, its diameter 4 mm.

As is characteristic of the genus Mitromorpha, the shell is small and has an elongate-fusiform (spindle-like) shape. The shell is generally strongly sculptured with spiral cords and may also be crossed by longitudinal plicae (folds). The aperture is long and narrowly oval. The columella (the central pillar of the shell) is straight and typically bears a few small teeth or folds.

== Distribution ==
This marine species occurs off Japan, New Caledonia and the Loyalty Islands.
