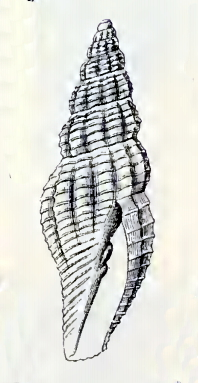
- Original image of a shell of Mitromorpha torticula

Scientific classification
- Kingdom: Animalia
- Phylum: Mollusca
- Class: Gastropoda
- Subclass: Caenogastropoda
- Order: Neogastropoda
- Superfamily: Conoidea
- Family: Mitromorphidae
- Genus: Mitromorpha
- Species: M. torticula

Binomial name
- Mitromorpha torticula (Dall, 1889)

Synonyms
- Cymakra torticula (Dall, 1889); Mitra (Thala ?) torticula Dall, 1889

= Mitromorpha torticula =

Species of gastropod

Mitromorpha torticula is a species of sea snail, a marine gastropod mollusk in the family Mitromorphidae.

== Description ==
The length of the shell attains 12.2 mm, its diameter 4 mm.

(Original description) The elongated shell is acute. It is pale yellowish, paler toward the extremities, with a dehiscent thin fibrous epidermis. Its axial line is somewhat convex toward the right. The protoconch is glassy, white, mammillate and consists of two whorls. The other whorls number about six, of which the body whorl forms more than half the shell. The sculpture consists of (on the body whorl) 12 rounded straight ribs, widest near the periphery, extending across the whorls and fainter near the suture and on the siphonal canal. These are crossed by about (on the body whorl) 16 rounded even threads, which pass over the ribs and interspaces without any marked nodulation and are separated by wider interspaces. The suture is not impressed. The aperture is narrow. The outer lip is thin and simple except for a slight crenulation due to the sculpture. The columella is straight, acute anteriorly. There is no callus on the body or columella. The shell show two plaits, distinct but not strong.

== Distribution ==
This species occurs in the Caribbean Sea off Cuba.

== Bibliography ==
- W.H. Dall (1889) A preliminary catalogue of the shell-bearing marine mollusks and brachiopods of the southeastern coast of the United States, with illustrations of many of the species; Bulletin of the United States National Museum; no. 37
