= Mitromorpha granulifera =

Scientific classification
- Kingdom: Animalia
- Phylum: Mollusca
- Class: Gastropoda
- Subclass: Caenogastropoda
- Order: Neogastropoda
- Superfamily: Conoidea
- Family: Mitromorphidae
- Genus: Mitromorpha
- Species: M. granulifera

Binomial name
- Mitromorpha granulifera (Powell, 1937)

Synonyms
- Mitrithara granulifera Powell, 1937; Mitromorpha (Mitrolumna) granulifera granulifera (Powell, A.W.B., 1937)

Species of gastropod

Mitromorpha granulifera is a species of sea snail, a marine gastropod mollusk in the family Mitromorphidae.

== Description ==
The length of the shell attains 3.85 mm and its diameter 1.8 mm.

== Distribution ==
This marine species is endemic to New Zealand and occurs off Three Kings Islands.
