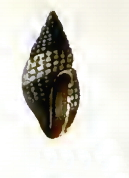
- Original image of a shell of Mitromorpha multigranosa

Scientific classification
- Kingdom: Animalia
- Phylum: Mollusca
- Class: Gastropoda
- Subclass: Caenogastropoda
- Order: Neogastropoda
- Superfamily: Conoidea
- Family: Mitromorphidae
- Genus: Mitromorpha
- Species: M. multigranosa

Binomial name
- Mitromorpha multigranosa (E.A. Smith, 1890)

Synonyms
- Mitromorpha (Mitrolumna) multigranosa (E.A. Smith, 1890); Pleurotoma (Clathurella) multigranosa E. A. Smith, 1890 (basionym); Pleurotoma multigranosa E.A. Smith, 1890

= Mitromorpha multigranosa =

Species of gastropod

Mitromorpha multigranosa is a species of sea snail, a marine gastropod mollusk in the family Mitromorphidae.

== Description ==
The length of the shell attains 4.3 mm, its diameter is 2. mm.

The small shell has a fusiform-ovate shape. Its color varies from blackish to reddish with a white zone above the middle of the whorl. It is ornated everywhere with white or blackish to reddish granules. The shell has 5½ whorls, of which 2½ smooth whorls in the protoconch. They are at the top concave and carinated, the others are rather flat. The ribs are crossed by 14 spiral lirae. The ribs and the lirae are so near together that the granules almost touch one another. The narrow aperture measure about ½ the total length. The columella is straight and shows two-minute tubercles in the middle. and has a narrow callus. The outer lip is hardly incrassate and is slightly sinuate at the top.

== Distribution ==
This species occurs in the Atlantic Ocean off St. Helena.
