= Mitromorpha zilpha =

Scientific classification
- Kingdom: Animalia
- Phylum: Mollusca
- Class: Gastropoda
- Subclass: Caenogastropoda
- Order: Neogastropoda
- Family: Mitromorphidae
- Genus: Mitromorpha
- Species: M. zilpha

Binomial name
- Mitromorpha zilpha (Dall, 1927)

Synonyms
- Mitra zilpha Dall, 1927

Species of gastropod

Mitromorpha zilpha is a species of sea snail, a marine gastropod mollusk in the family Mitromorphidae.

== Description ==
The length of the shell attains 6 mm, its diameter 3 mm.

(Original description) The small, dull white shell is fusiform, with a large smooth white protoconch of 1½ whorls and 3½ subsequent whorls. The suture is distinct. The whorls are moderately rounded, sometimes with a shoulder in front of the suture. The axial sculpture consists of a variable number of rounded strong ribs (14 to 21 on the body whorl) with interspaces wider or narrower in conformity with the number of ribs, extending over the whorls but obsolete near the siphonal canal. The spiral sculpture consists of fine threads, three or four on the penultimate and 10 or more on the body whorl, with wider interspaces, overrunning but not nodulating the ribs. The narrow aperture is semilunat. The outer lip is thin, smooth within, the body smooth. The columella is straight, with two rather strong oblique plaits. The siphonal canal is produced, its axis is minutely pervious.

== Distribution ==
This marine species occurs off Georgia and Florida, USA.
