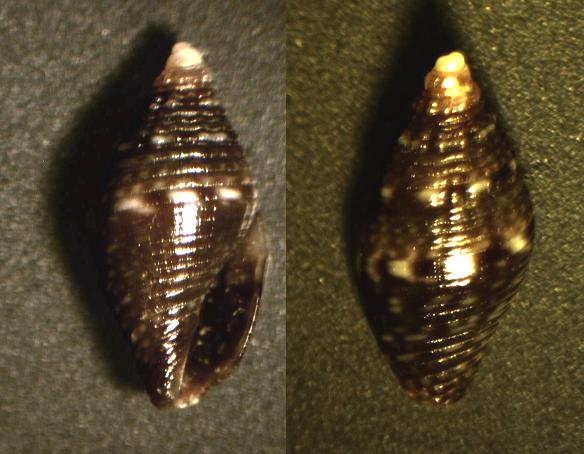
- Shells of Mitromorpha hierroensis

Scientific classification
- Kingdom: Animalia
- Phylum: Mollusca
- Class: Gastropoda
- Subclass: Caenogastropoda
- Order: Neogastropoda
- Superfamily: Conoidea
- Family: Mitromorphidae
- Genus: Mitromorpha
- Species: M. hierroensis

Binomial name
- Mitromorpha hierroensis Mifsud, 2001

Synonyms
- Mitromorpha (Mitrolumna) hierroensis Mifsud, 2001

= Mitromorpha hierroensis =

Species of gastropod

Mitromorpha hierroensis is a species of sea snail, a marine gastropod mollusk in the family Mitromorphidae.

== Description ==
The length of the shell varies between 4 mm and 6 mm.

Their functional type is benthos.

Their feeding type is predatory.

== Distribution ==
This marine species occurs off the Canary Islands and Madeira.
