= Mitromorpha undulata =

Scientific classification
- Kingdom: Animalia
- Phylum: Mollusca
- Class: Gastropoda
- Subclass: Caenogastropoda
- Order: Neogastropoda
- Superfamily: Conoidea
- Family: Mitromorphidae
- Genus: Mitromorpha
- Species: M. undulata

Binomial name
- Mitromorpha undulata (Dall, 1927)

Synonyms
- Mitrolumna undulata (Dall, 1927); Mitromorpha (Mitrolumna) undulata Amati, Smriglio & Oliverio, 2015

Species of gastropod

Mitromorpha undulata is a species of sea snail, a marine gastropod mollusk in the family Mitromorphidae.

== Description ==
The length of the shell attains 7.5 mm, its diameter 4 mm.

(Original description) The small, white shell has about five whorls, including one rather large smooth protoconch whorl. The suture is undulate and appressed. The spiral sculpture consists of (on the penultimate whorl four, on the body whorl about a dozen) prominent equal cords. These are slightly swollen where they cross the ribs, the posterior cord somewhat more widely separated from the rest. The axial sculpture consists of (on the penultimate whorl nine) rounded ribs with equal or wider interspaces, crossing the whorls but becoming obsolete toward the end of the body whorl. The aperture is narrow. The outer lip is sharp and lirate within. The columella shows two well-marked pustulations. The siphonal canal is short and slender, slightly recurved.

== Distribution ==
This marine species occurs off Georgia and Florida, USA.
