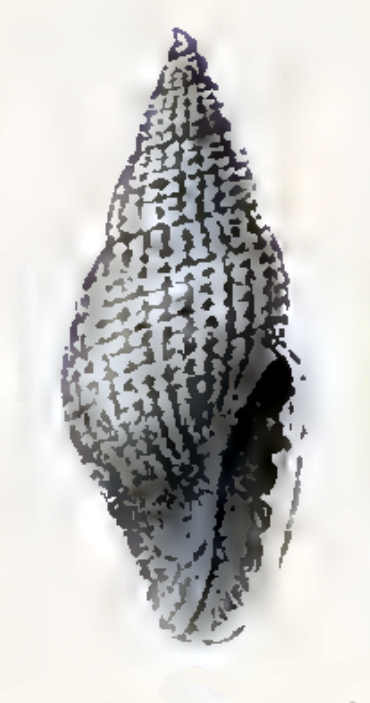
- Original image of a shell of Mitromorpha pleurotomoides

Scientific classification
- Kingdom: Animalia
- Phylum: Mollusca
- Class: Gastropoda
- Subclass: Caenogastropoda
- Order: Neogastropoda
- Superfamily: Conoidea
- Family: Mitromorphidae
- Genus: Mitromorpha
- Species: M. pleurotomoides

Binomial name
- Mitromorpha pleurotomoides (E. A. Smith, 1890)

Synonyms
- Mitra (Thala) pleurotomoides E. A. Smith, 1890 (basionym); Mitrolumna pleurotomoides (E. A. Smith, 1890); Mitromorpha (Mitrolumna) pleurotomoides E. A. Smith, 1890

= Mitromorpha pleurotomoides =

Species of gastropod

Mitromorpha pleurotomoides is a species of sea snail, a marine gastropod mollusk in the family Mitromorphidae.

== Description ==
The length of the shell attains five mm, its diameter two mm.

(Original description) This small, slightly fusiform species is remarkable for the peculiar truncate apex, the pleurotomoid labral sinus, and the columellar plaits being two only in number. Its color is white, sometimes rose-tinged. The shell contains six slightly convex whorls, including two vitreous whorl in the protoconch. The 16 longitudinal ribs and the transverse lirae (5–6 in the penultimate whorl, 18–20 in the body whorl) are produced into acute nodules at the points of intersection. The small aperture is narrow. The outer lip is slightly incrassate, distinctly sinuate and shows about six small denticles inside. The wide siphonal canal is very short. The columella is slightly oblique and shows two tubercles in the middle.

== Distribution ==
This species occurs in the Atlantic Ocean off St. Helena.
