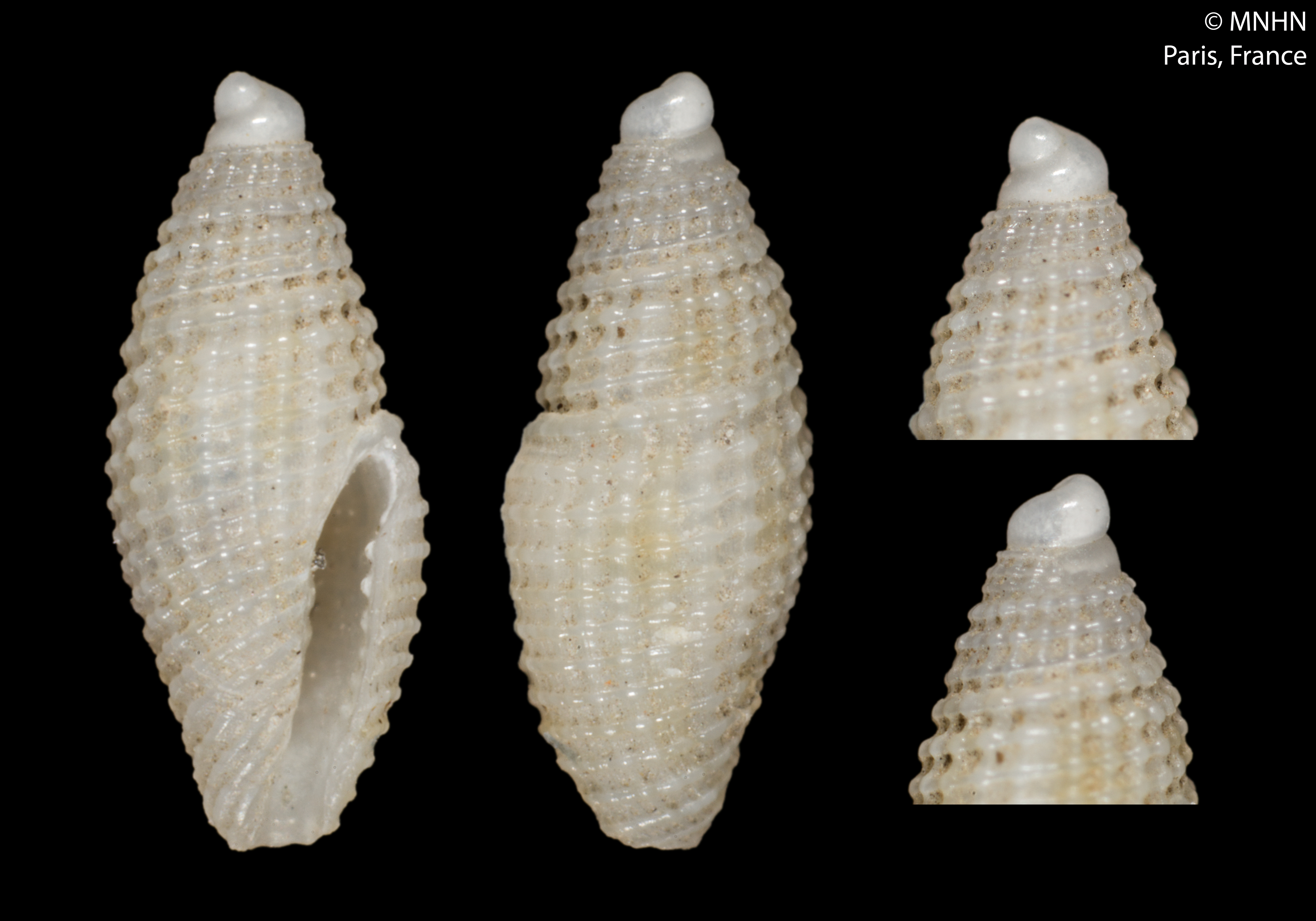

Scientific classification
- Kingdom: Animalia
- Phylum: Mollusca
- Class: Gastropoda
- Subclass: Caenogastropoda
- Order: Neogastropoda
- Superfamily: Conoidea
- Family: Mitromorphidae
- Genus: Mitromorpha
- Species: M. kilburni

Binomial name
- Mitromorpha kilburni Drivas & Jay, 1986

Synonyms
- Mitromorpha (Mitrolumna) kilburni Drivas & Jay, 1986

= Mitromorpha kilburni =

Species of gastropod

Mitromorpha kilburni is a species of sea snail, a marine gastropod mollusk in the family Mitromorphidae.

== Description ==
Original description: "Shell ovate, biconical, rather slender. The length of the narrow aperture is equal to the height of the spire. Protoconch of two and a half plain white whorls. The apex is wide and dome shaped, with an unrolled tip. Teleoconch of 4 whorls. Sculpture is made up of strong, flat-topped, widely spaced spiral cords, 3 on the whorls of the spire and 15 on the body whorl. They are crossed by slightly smaller axial ribs, 24 per whorl. Each crossing point is marked by a small bead. As a result the whole shell has a cancellate granulose appearance. The columella has two folds. The outer lip 8 denticles. Sinus with distinct subsutural channel. Colour is white to creamy white, some specimens with pale brown badly delimited blotches. The holotype measures 3.1 mm in height and 1.3 mm in width. The species is fairly constant, adult size varying only from 3.1 to 3.8 mm."

The length of the shell attains 4 mm.

== Type material ==
"The holotype and one paratype will be deposited in the Museum d'Histoire Naturelle, in Paris;
one paratype in the Academy of Natural Sciences in Philadelphia, USA;
and two more paratypes in the Natal Museum, South Africa."

== Distribution ==
This marine species occurs in the Indian Ocean off Réunion.

== Habitat ==
"The species is rather rare and, up till now always found dead in hand-dredged muddy black sand,
at depths ranging from 20 to 80 m., our limit in skin diving, but mostly at 50-54 m."
