= Mitromorpha karpathensis =

Scientific classification
- Kingdom: Animalia
- Phylum: Mollusca
- Class: Gastropoda
- Subclass: Caenogastropoda
- Order: Neogastropoda
- Superfamily: Conoidea
- Family: Mitromorphidae
- Genus: Mitromorpha
- Species: M. karpathensis

Binomial name
- Mitromorpha karpathensis (Nordsieck, 1969)

Synonyms
- Mitrolumna olivoidea var. unifasciata Bucquoy, Dautzenberg & Dollfus, 1883 (uncertain synonym); Mitromorpha (Mitrolumna) karpathensis (Nordsieck, F., 1969); Pusia karpathensis Nordsieck, 1969

Species of gastropod

Mitromorpha karpathensis is a species of sea snail, a marine gastropod mollusk in the family Mitromorphidae.

== Description ==
The length of the shell varies between 4 mm and 8 mm. Coloring is often light brown with white mottling; the shape of the shell most closely resembles a cone

== Distribution ==
This marine species occurs in the Mediterranean Sea and off the Canary Islands.
