= Mitromorpha annobonensis =

Scientific classification
- Kingdom: Animalia
- Phylum: Mollusca
- Class: Gastropoda
- Subclass: Caenogastropoda
- Order: Neogastropoda
- Superfamily: Conoidea
- Family: Mitromorphidae
- Genus: Mitromorpha
- Species: M. annobonensis

Binomial name
- Mitromorpha annobonensis Rolán & Gori, 2012

Species of gastropod

Mitromorpha annobonensis is a species of sea snail, a marine gastropod mollusk in the family Mitromorphidae. It seems to be endemic to Annobón — not known from many other places.

== Description ==
The length of the shell attains 4.3 mm.

== Distribution ==
This marine species occurs off Equatorial Guinea.
