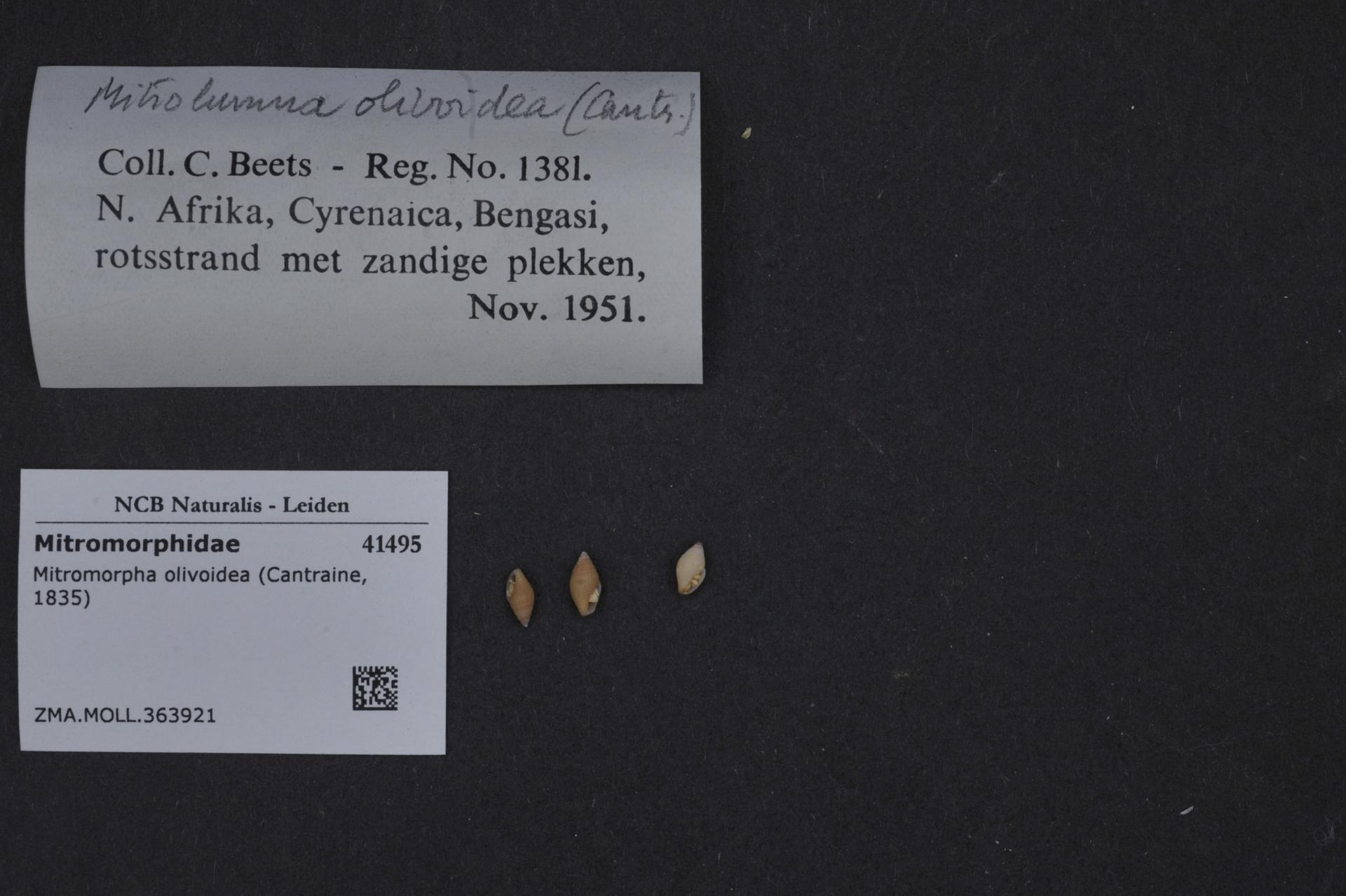
- Mitromorpha olivoidea (Cantraine, 1835)

Scientific classification
- Kingdom: Animalia
- Phylum: Mollusca
- Class: Gastropoda
- Subclass: Caenogastropoda
- Order: Neogastropoda
- Superfamily: Conoidea
- Family: Mitromorphidae
- Genus: Mitromorpha
- Species: M. olivoidea

Binomial name
- Mitromorpha olivoidea (Cantraine, 1835)

Synonyms
- Mitra olivoidea Cantraine, 1835 (original description); † Mitra striarella Calcara, 1841 (uncertain synonym)*; Mitrolumna melitensis Mifsud, 1993; Mitrolumna oliviformis Locard, 1891 (unjustified emendation); Mitrolumna olivoidea (Cantraine, 1835); Mitromorpha (Mitrolumna) olivoidea (Cantraine, 1835)· accepted, alternate representation; Mitromorpha melitensis (Mifsud, 1993)

= Mitromorpha olivoidea =

Species of gastropod

Mitromorpha olivoidea is a species of sea snail, a marine gastropod mollusk in the family Mitromorphidae.

== Description ==
The length varies from 6 to 10 mm (0.24 to 0.39 in).

== Distribution ==
This species occurs in the Mediterranean Sea off France, Spain, Algeria and Capri; also off Morocco.
