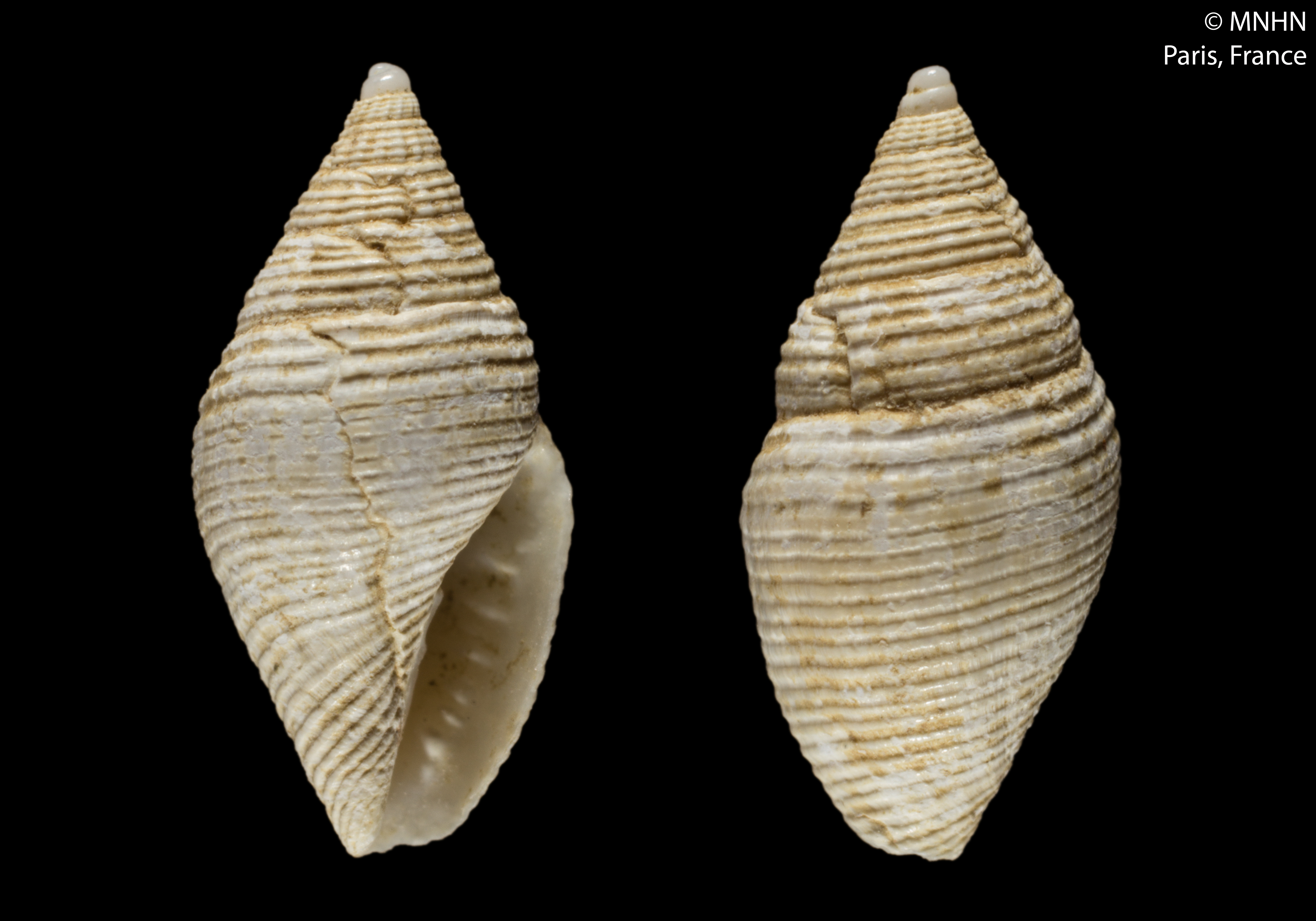

Scientific classification
- Kingdom: Animalia
- Phylum: Mollusca
- Class: Gastropoda
- Subclass: Caenogastropoda
- Order: Neogastropoda
- Family: Mitromorphidae
- Genus: Mitromorpha
- Species: M. senegalensis

Binomial name
- Mitromorpha senegalensis (Rolan & Boyer, 2001)

Synonyms
- Mitrolumna senegalensis Rolan & Boyer, 2001; Mitromorpha (Mitrolumna) senegalensis (Rolan & Boyer, 2001)

= Mitromorpha senegalensis =

Species of gastropod

Mitromorpha senegalensis is a species of sea snail, a marine gastropod mollusk in the family Mitromorphidae.

== Description ==
The shell can attain a length of 8 mm.

== Distribution ==
This marine species occurs off Senegal.
