= Mitromorpha maculata =

Scientific classification
- Kingdom: Animalia
- Phylum: Mollusca
- Class: Gastropoda
- Subclass: Caenogastropoda
- Order: Neogastropoda
- Superfamily: Conoidea
- Family: Mitromorphidae
- Genus: Mitromorpha
- Species: M. maculata

Binomial name
- Mitromorpha maculata Sysoev, 1990

Synonyms
- Mitromorpha (Mitrolumna) maculata Sysoev, 1990

Species of gastropod

Mitromorpha maculata is a species of sea snail, a marine gastropod mollusk in the family Mitromorphidae.

== Distribution ==
This species occurs in the Pacific Ocean off the Nazka Ridge and Sala y Gomez Ridge.
