= Mitromorpha spreta =

Scientific classification
- Kingdom: Animalia
- Phylum: Mollusca
- Class: Gastropoda
- Subclass: Caenogastropoda
- Order: Neogastropoda
- Superfamily: Conoidea
- Family: Mitromorphidae
- Genus: Mitromorpha
- Species: M. spreta

Binomial name
- Mitromorpha spreta (Adams A., 1864)

Synonyms
- Callithea spreta Adams A., 1864

Species of gastropod

Mitromorpha spreta is a species of sea snail, a marine gastropod mollusk in the family Mitromorphidae.

== Description ==
A small pale-brown species with the seven whorls decussated by nine, fine longitudinal ribs and strong transverse lirae. The aperture is narrow. The outer lip shows two obsolete plicae.

== Distribution ==
This marine species occurs off Japan.
