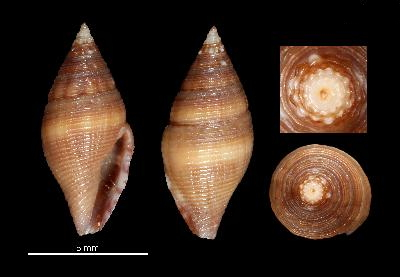
- Shells of Mitromorpha oliva (paratype in the MNHN, Paris)

Scientific classification
- Kingdom: Animalia
- Phylum: Mollusca
- Class: Gastropoda
- Subclass: Caenogastropoda
- Order: Neogastropoda
- Superfamily: Conoidea
- Family: Mitromorphidae
- Genus: Mitromorpha
- Species: M. oliva

Binomial name
- Mitromorpha oliva Chino & Stahlschmidt, 2009

= Mitromorpha oliva =

Species of gastropod

Mitromorpha oliva is a species of sea snail, a marine gastropod mollusk in the family Mitromorphidae.

== Description ==
The length of the shell varies between 8 mm and 11.2 mm.

== Distribution ==
This marine species occurs off the Philippines.
