= Antimitra lirata =

Scientific classification
- Kingdom: Animalia
- Phylum: Mollusca
- Class: Gastropoda
- (unranked): clade Caenogastropoda clade Hypsogastropoda clade Neogastropoda
- Superfamily: Buccinoidea
- Family: Colubrariidae
- Genus: Antimitra
- Species: A. lirata

Binomial name
- Antimitra lirata (Adams A., 1865)

Synonyms
- Mitromorpha lirata Adams A., 1865

Species of gastropod

Antimitra lirata is a species of sea snail, a marine gastropod mollusk in the family Colubrariidae.
