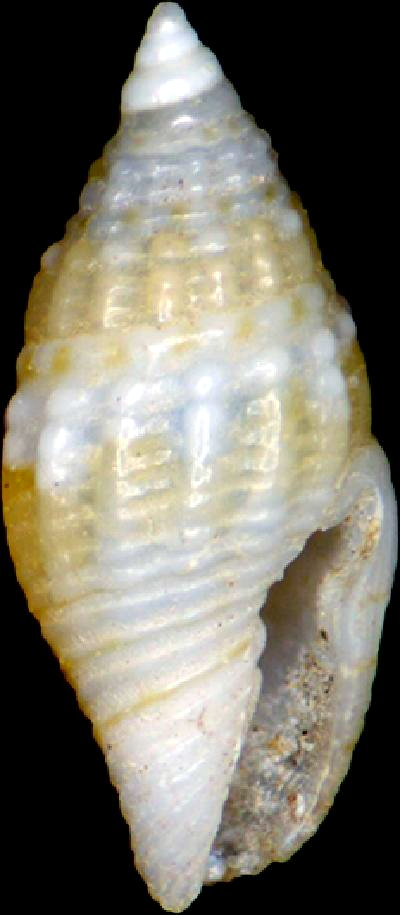
- Shells of Anarithma aurea (holotype in the MNHN, Paris)

Scientific classification
- Kingdom: Animalia
- Phylum: Mollusca
- Class: Gastropoda
- Subclass: Caenogastropoda
- Order: Neogastropoda
- Superfamily: Conoidea
- Family: Mitromorphidae
- Genus: Anarithma
- Species: A. aurea

Binomial name
- Anarithma aurea F. Boyer & Renda, 2022

= Anarithma aurea =

Species of gastropod

Anarithma aurea is a species of sea snail, a marine gastropod mollusk in the family Mitromorphidae.

== Description ==
The shell reaches a length of 3.8 mm in the holotype, with paratypes ranging from 2.70 to 3.85 mm. It has a sub-oval, biconical outline with a beaded surface texture, and a protoconch of about 4.2 whorls with a distinctly projecting nucleus. The shell bears thick axial ribs crossed by raised spiral cords, which form conspicuous rounded nodules on the upper cords of the body whorl and the second-to-last whorl. The aperture is short and moderately wide, the inner lip is only slightly thickened, and the anal canal is long, narrow, and sinuous; the columella carries two moderately close folds.

Colour pattern is a light golden shade on the upper whorls, deepening and spreading further down the body whorl, with golden spiral lines between the cords on the lower half of the body whorl. The protoconch and the topmost row of spiral beads are opaque white, while the rest of the shell surface is a translucent greyish-white. Anarithma aurea is considered a sibling species of A. metula, from which it is distinguished by its more even, rounded nodules, narrower inner lip, longer and more sinuous anal canal, and uniformly golden colouration.

== Distribution ==
This marine species is known from off Réunion, where it is described as fairly common, and from a small number of specimens collected in the central Philippines (Mactan and Balicasag islands).
