= Anarithma inornata =

Scientific classification
- Kingdom: Animalia
- Phylum: Mollusca
- Class: Gastropoda
- Subclass: Caenogastropoda
- Order: Neogastropoda
- Superfamily: Conoidea
- Family: Mitromorphidae
- Genus: Anarithma
- Species: A. inornata

Binomial name
- Anarithma inornata (Hervier, 1899)

Synonyms
- Columbella stepheni var. inornata Hervier, 1900 superseded combination; Mitromorpha inornata (Hervier, 1900) superseded combination

Species of gastropod

Anarithma inornata is a species of sea snail, a marine gastropod mollusk in the family Mitromorphidae.

== Description ==
The shell is more globose and thicker than in Columbella stepheni (synonym of Anarithma metula (Hinds, 1843) )of which it was originally considered a variety. The brown spots are smaller and are better rounded on the upper whorls. On the body whorl, they form a second series located near the base. Notably, the large triangular brown spot does not appear in this species.

== Distribution ==
This marine species occurs off the Loyalty Islands.
