= Mitromorpha hewitti =

Scientific classification
- Kingdom: Animalia
- Phylum: Mollusca
- Class: Gastropoda
- Subclass: Caenogastropoda
- Order: Neogastropoda
- Superfamily: Conoidea
- Family: Mitromorphidae
- Genus: Mitromorpha
- Species: M. hewitti

Binomial name
- Mitromorpha hewitti (Tomlin, 1921)

Synonyms
- Antimitra hewitti Tomlin, 1921; Mitromorpha (Mitrolumna) hewitti (Tomlin, 1921)

Species of gastropod

Mitromorpha hewitti is a species of sea snail, a marine gastropod mollusk in the family Mitromorphidae.

This species was originally named Mitromorpha volva var. G.B. Sowerby III by E. Smith in the Journal of Malacology, xi, p. 31, pi. ii, f. 13, but Smith didn't describe it as distinct. J.R. Tomlin described it as Antimitra (?) hewitti but also indicated that the correct usage of the generic name Mitromorpha is pointed out in Proceedings of the Malacological Society of London, vol. xii, p. 32S,

== Description ==
The length of the shell attains 7 mm, its diameter 2.75 mm.

(Original description) The ribs are broader, flatter, further apart than in Mitromorpha volva, and are more widely spaced on the upper half of the basal whorl than elsewhere. There are four ribs on the penultimate whorl, and sixteen to seventeen on the body whorl, as against five to seven and at least twenty-one respectively in volva. The interstices show distinct axial sculpture, consisting of fine raised lines very close together, with numerous more prominent ones occurring very irregularly. All the ribs on the last three whorls are more or less evidently and regularly spotted with brown. This is particularly noticeable on the peripheral rib, which is broader than the rest and traceable on the two whorls preceding the body whorl.

== Distribution ==
This marine species was found off Port Alfred, South Africa.
