= Mitromorpha crassilirata =

Scientific classification
- Kingdom: Animalia
- Phylum: Mollusca
- Class: Gastropoda
- Subclass: Caenogastropoda
- Order: Neogastropoda
- Superfamily: Conoidea
- Family: Mitromorphidae
- Genus: Mitromorpha
- Species: M. crassilirata

Binomial name
- Mitromorpha crassilirata (Verco, 1909)

Synonyms
- Aesopus pallidulus (Hedley, 1906); Mitromorpha paucilirata var. crassilirata Verco, 1909 (original combination); Mitromorpha (Mitrolumna) crassilirata (Verco, 1909)

Species of gastropod

Mitromorpha crassilirata is a species of sea snail, a marine gastropod mollusk in the family Mitromorphidae.

== Description ==
The length of the shell attains 4.5 mm, its diameter 1.7 mm.

(Original description) The shell is slightly longer than Mitromorpha paucilirata and more solid, with the same number of spirals, but these are much stouter, the infrasutural cord being specially round and conspicuous.

== Distribution ==
This marine species is endemic to Australia and occurs off South Australia.
