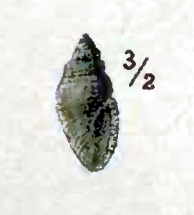
- Drawing of a shell of Mitromorpha gracilior

Scientific classification
- Kingdom: Animalia
- Phylum: Mollusca
- Class: Gastropoda
- Subclass: Caenogastropoda
- Order: Neogastropoda
- Superfamily: Conoidea
- Family: Mitromorphidae
- Genus: Mitromorpha
- Species: M. gracilior

Binomial name
- Mitromorpha gracilior (Tryon, 1884)

Synonyms
- Daphnella gracilior Tryon, 1884; Mitromorpha aspera var. gracilior Hemphill

= Mitromorpha gracilior =

Species of gastropod

Mitromorpha gracilior is a species of sea snail, a marine gastropod mollusk in the family Mitromorphidae.

== Description ==
The length of the shell varies between 4 mm and 5 mm.

The decussation not so deep as in Mitromorpha aspera, so that the surface is smoother, the tuberculation smaller. Sometimes the clathration of the body whorl is only seen on the upper portion, the longitudinal costulae becoming obsolete below.
