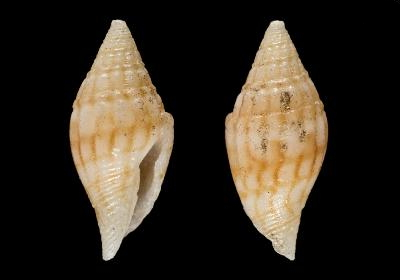
- Shell of Anarithma sublachryma (specimen in MNHN, Paris)

Scientific classification
- Kingdom: Animalia
- Phylum: Mollusca
- Class: Gastropoda
- Subclass: Caenogastropoda
- Order: Neogastropoda
- Superfamily: Conoidea
- Family: Mitromorphidae
- Genus: Anarithma
- Species: A. sublachryma

Binomial name
- Anarithma sublachryma (Hervier, 1900)

Synonyms
- Anarithma maesi Drivas & M. Jay, 1986 junior subjective synonym; Columbella sublachryma Hervier, 1900 superseded combination; Mitromorpha sublachryma (Hervier, 1900) · > superseded combination

= Anarithma sublachryma =

Species of gastropod

Anarithma sublachryma is a species of sea snail, a marine gastropod mollusk in the family Mitromorphidae.

== Description ==
The length of the shell attains 5 mm.

(Described in Latin as Anarithma sublachryma) The shell is smaller, biconical, and acuminated at both ends. The spire is short, rather solid, shining, and white, longitudinally veined with tawny between the ribs, and spirally trilineate (marked with three lines).

There are 9 whorls: the 3 embryonic ones are milky white, round, and smooth. The succeeding whorls are plano-declivous, scarcely convex, short, and adorned with strong, smooth longitudinal ribs. They are separated by a rather thick suture, with a single marginal furrow below the suture, and grooved with minute lirae between the ribs.

The body whorl equals 2/3 of the total length, is elongated, inflated superiorly, depressed in the middle, then striated, ending in a somewhat recurved and acuminated siphonal canal. The aperture is elongated, exceeding half of the total length, very narrow, and oblique. The columella is flexuous, concave superiorly, and unisulcate (one-grooved) in the middle.

The outer lip is thickened at the suture, flattened, obliquely declivous, with an acute margin, sinuous below the suture, and then produced. In the aperture, it is thickened and plicate in the middle.

(Described as Anarithma maesi) "Globose, wide, biconical. The length of the narrow aperture is the same as the height of the spire. The sculpture consists of 15 axial plicae per whorl, overcrossed by spiral cords, 11 on the body whorl, followed by 11 more, slightly stronger and more widely spaced on the base. There are 4 riblets on the penultimate whorl, 2 on the preceding whorl, while the earlier whorls have only the two strongest cords. The protoconch is conical, smooth and brown and is made up of three and a half to four whorls. The shell is entirely pale brown, with a whitish spiral band on the upper part of the body whorl. The holotype is 4 mm in height and 2.1 mm in width. The size varies from 4 to 4.6 mm. The species is quite similar to Anarithma metula, from which it differs by its brown protoconch."

== Distribution ==
This marine species occurs of Réunion and the Loyalty Islands.

== Type material ==
The holotype will be deposited in the Museum d'Histoire Naturelle in Paris, and two paratypes in the Natal Museum, South Africa
