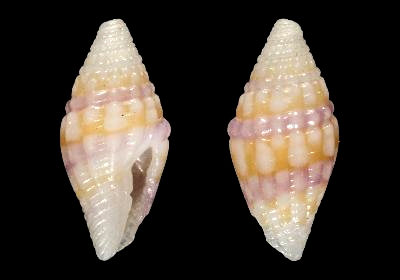
- Shell of Anarithma iozona (syntype at MNHN, Paris)

Scientific classification
- Kingdom: Animalia
- Phylum: Mollusca
- Class: Gastropoda
- Subclass: Caenogastropoda
- Order: Neogastropoda
- Superfamily: Conoidea
- Family: Mitromorphidae
- Genus: Anarithma
- Species: A. iozona

Binomial name
- Anarithma iozona (Hervier, 1899)

Synonyms
- Columbella iozona Hervier, 1899 (original combination); Mitromorpha iozona (Hervier, 1900)

= Anarithma iozona =

Species of gastropod

Anarithma iozona is a species of sea snail, a marine gastropod mollusk in the family Mitromorphidae.

== Description ==
The length of the shell attains 4.6 mm, its diameter 2.5 mm.

The shell has biconic shape with a rather acute spire. The overall color is white with yellow dots on the last two or three whorls. There is a violet margin on top of the penultimate whorl and below the suture, continuing on the body whorl. The shell contains 7–8 whorls (the apex is broken). The upper whorls are short, convex and with discrete sutures. The shell shows strong longitudinal ribs and two transverse, granose striae below the sutures. The aperture is oblong and narrow. The top of the columella is concave, the middle inflated and with one groove. The siphonal canal is short and slightly recurved. The outer lip is incrassate below the suture, slightly convex and very oblique. It has a sharp margin with a denticle cin the middle.

== Distribution ==
This marine species occurs off Réunion and in the Indo-Pacific.
