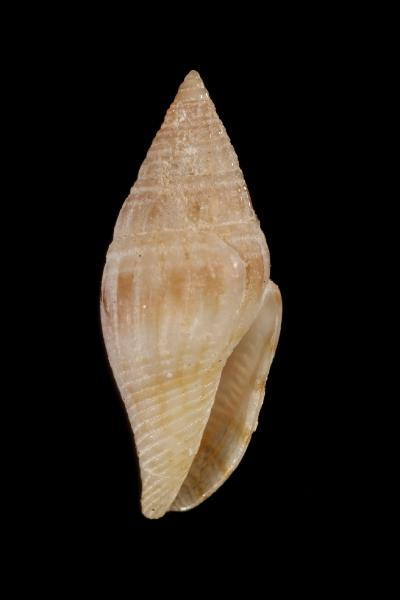
- Apertural view of a shell of Anarithma dorcas (specimen in MNHN, Paris)

Scientific classification
- Kingdom: Animalia
- Phylum: Mollusca
- Class: Gastropoda
- Subclass: Caenogastropoda
- Order: Neogastropoda
- Superfamily: Conoidea
- Family: Mitromorphidae
- Genus: Anarithma
- Species: A. dorcas

Binomial name
- Anarithma dorcas Kuroda, Habe & Oyama, 1971

Synonyms
- Mitrella celinae Kosuge, 1980; Mitromorpha dorcas (Kuroda, T. & K. Oyama in Kuroda, T., T. Habe & K. Oyama, 1971)

= Anarithma dorcas =

Species of gastropod

Anarithma dorcas is a species of sea snail, a marine gastropod mollusk in the family Mitromorphidae.

== Description ==
The length of the shell varies between 15 mm and 28 mm.

== Distribution ==
This marine species occurs off the Philippines and Japan.

== Reproduction ==
Mitromorpha dorcas is a type of sea snail that does not release its eggs and sperm into the water like many other marine animals. It is a non-broadcast spawner. Its life cycle also doesn't include the trochophore stage, which is the free-swimming early stage common among the marine creatures.
