= Mitromorpha crenipicta =

Scientific classification
- Kingdom: Animalia
- Phylum: Mollusca
- Class: Gastropoda
- Subclass: Caenogastropoda
- Order: Neogastropoda
- Superfamily: Conoidea
- Family: Mitromorphidae
- Genus: Mitromorpha
- Species: M. crenipicta

Binomial name
- Mitromorpha crenipicta (Dautzenberg, 1889)

Synonyms
- Mitrolumna crenipicta Dautzenberg, 1889; Mitromorpha (Mitrolumna) crenipicta Dautzenberg, Ph., 1889; Mitrolumna olivoidea var. crenipicta Dautzenberg, 1889

Species of gastropod

Mitromorpha crenipicta is a species of sea snail, a marine gastropod mollusk in the family Mitromorphidae.

== Description ==
The length of the shell varies between 4 mm and 7 mm.

== Distribution ==
This marine species occurs in the Atlantic Ocean off the Azores and the Canary Islands.
