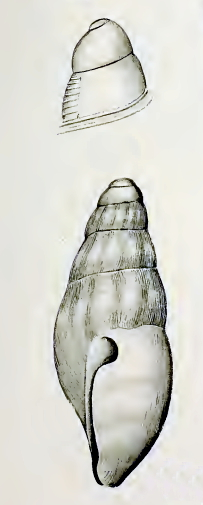
- Original image (and protoconch) of Mitromorpha paula

Scientific classification
- Kingdom: Animalia
- Phylum: Mollusca
- Class: Gastropoda
- Subclass: Caenogastropoda
- Order: Neogastropoda
- Superfamily: Conoidea
- Family: Mitromorphidae
- Genus: Mitromorpha
- Species: M. paula

Binomial name
- Mitromorpha paula Verco, 1909

Synonyms
- Mitromorpha (Mitrolumna) paula (Verco, J.C., 1909); Mitromorpha paula var. leuca Verco, J.C. 1909

= Mitromorpha paula =

Species of gastropod

Mitromorpha paula is a species of sea snail, a marine gastropod mollusk in the family Mitromorphidae.

== Description ==
The length of the shell attains 3.8 mm, its diameter 1.5 mm.

(Original description) The minute, solid shell consists of 4½ whorls, including a blunt protoconch of 2 whorls,. The whorls of the protoconch are convex and apparently smooth, but microscopically granular, separated by a linear suture. It ends abruptly, and from within it issue the spirals of the first spire-whorls. Perfect specimens show the granules in very close-set spiral rows. The spire whorls are slightly convex, with eight spiral lirae. The sutures are simple. The body whorl is arge, tapering anteriorly. The aperture is elongate-oval and rather widely open in front. The outer lip is simple, crenulated outside by the sculpture, slightly convex in profile, with a minute round, shallow sinus close to the suture. The inner lip is a complete narrow glaze. The sculpture shows twenty-three spiral lirae, flat-topped, half as wide as the interspaces, axially faintly incised. The colour is cinnamon-brown, lighter in a band on the prominence of the whorls.

== Distribution ==
This marine species is endemic to Australia and occurs off South Australia.
