= Arielia cancellata =

Scientific classification
- Kingdom: Animalia
- Phylum: Mollusca
- Class: Gastropoda
- Subclass: Caenogastropoda
- Order: Neogastropoda
- Superfamily: Conoidea
- Family: Mitromorphidae
- Genus: Arielia
- Species: A. cancellata

Binomial name
- Arielia cancellata Shuto, 1983

Synonyms
- Arielia (Vexiariella) cancellata Shuto, 1983

Species of gastropod

Arielia cancellata is a species of sea snail, a marine gastropod mollusk in the family Mitromorphidae.

== Distribution ==
This marine species occurs in the Arafura Sea off Australia.
