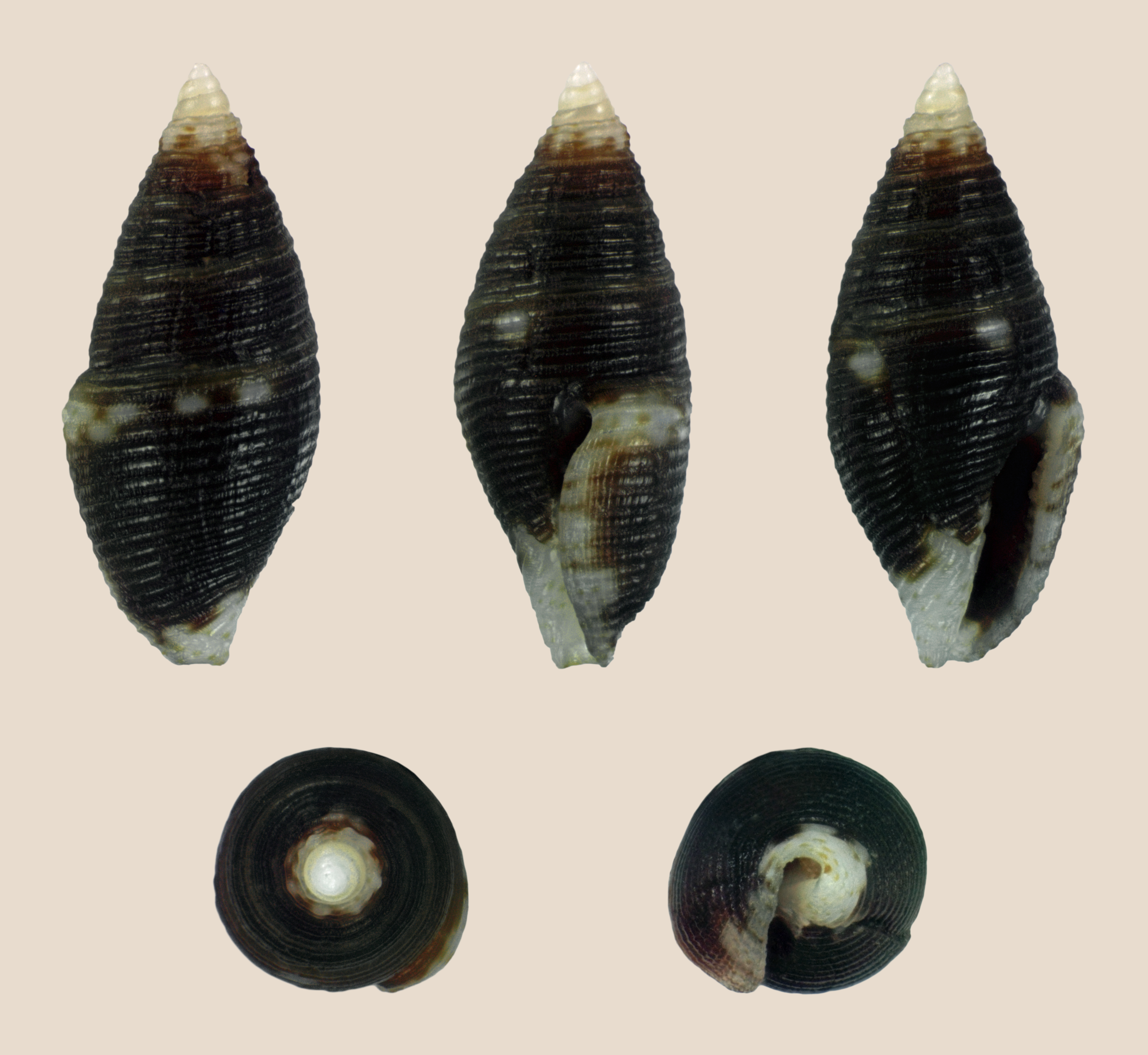
- Shell of Mitromorpha fischeri

Scientific classification
- Kingdom: Animalia
- Phylum: Mollusca
- Class: Gastropoda
- Subclass: Caenogastropoda
- Order: Neogastropoda
- Superfamily: Conoidea
- Family: Mitromorphidae
- Genus: Mitromorpha
- Species: M. fischeri

Binomial name
- Mitromorpha fischeri (Hervier, 1900)

Synonyms
- Columbella fischeri Hervier, 1900 (original combination); Columbella (Conidea) perplexa Schepman, M.M., 1911

= Mitromorpha fischeri =

Species of gastropod

Mitromorpha fischeri is a species of sea snail, a marine gastropod mollusk in the family Mitromorphidae.

== Description ==
The length of the shell varies between 4 mm and 10 mm.

The shell has an elongately-oval shape with rather acute spire. Its color is thick, black brown (if dry greyish, perhaps by the action of alcohol) with white upper whorls and base. It shows a few white spots on the whorls about the periphery and a row of white quadrangular blotches at the upper margin of white base. It contains about 8 whorls, of which nearly 2 smooth ones form the protoconch, . The subsequent whorls are only very slightly convex, separated by a rather conspicuous suture, which is however not very distinct by the spiral grooves, with which the whole shell is encircled. These grooves are rather deep, the subsutural and median one of body whorl however less so. The lirae are granose on 2 or 3 postnuclear whorls, lower on they are only closely punctured, the lirae remaining smooth, but for fine growth striae. The aperture is oblong and narrow. The peristome is thin, with only traces of a varix, internally with very faint, irregular wrinkles. The columellar margin is straight, smooth above, slightly plicate below by the basal grooves.

== Distribution ==
This marine species occurs off the Philippines, Indonesia, New Caledonia, Papua New Guinea, Japan and Réunion.
