= Mitromorpha striolata =

Scientific classification
- Kingdom: Animalia
- Phylum: Mollusca
- Class: Gastropoda
- Subclass: Caenogastropoda
- Order: Neogastropoda
- Family: Mitromorphidae
- Genus: Mitromorpha
- Species: M. striolata

Binomial name
- Mitromorpha striolata (Turton W. H., 1932)

Synonyms
- Antimitra striolata Turton W. H., 1932; Mitromorpha (Mitrolumna) striolata (Turton W. H., 1932)

Species of gastropod

Mitromorpha striolata is a species of sea snail, a marine gastropod mollusk in the family Mitromorphidae.

== Distribution ==
This marine species occurs off Port Alfred, South Africa.
