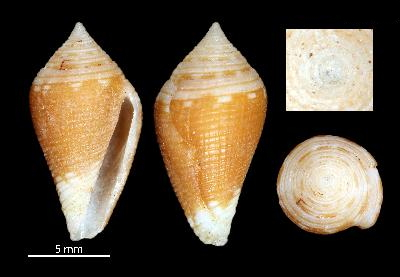
- Shell of Lovellona grandis (paratype in MNHN, Paris)

Scientific classification
- Kingdom: Animalia
- Phylum: Mollusca
- Class: Gastropoda
- Subclass: Caenogastropoda
- Order: Neogastropoda
- Superfamily: Conoidea
- Family: Mitromorphidae
- Genus: Lovellona
- Species: L. grandis

Binomial name
- Lovellona grandis Chino & Stahlschmidt, 2009

= Lovellona grandis =

Species of gastropod

Lovellona grandis is a species of sea snail, a marine gastropod mollusk in the family Mitromorphidae.

== Description ==
The shell size varies between 10 mm and 17 mm.

== Distribution ==
This marine species occurs off the Philippines and Japan.
