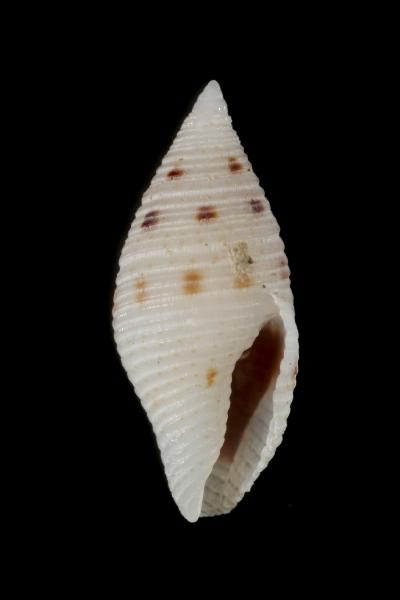
- Shell of Anarithma fuscafenestrata (specimen at MNHN, Paris)

Scientific classification
- Kingdom: Animalia
- Phylum: Mollusca
- Class: Gastropoda
- Subclass: Caenogastropoda
- Order: Neogastropoda
- Superfamily: Conoidea
- Family: Mitromorphidae
- Genus: Anarithma
- Species: A. fuscafenestrata

Binomial name
- Anarithma fuscafenestrata Chino & Stahlschmidt, 2014

Synonyms
- Mitromorpha fuscafenestrata Chino & Stahlschmidt, 2014 (original combination)

= Anarithma fuscafenestrata =

Species of gastropod

Anarithma fuscafenestrata is a species of sea snail, a marine gastropod mollusk in the family Mitromorphidae.

== Description ==
The length of the shell varies between 4 mm and 5.5 mm; the holotype, collected off Espiritu Santo, Vanuatu, measures 5.1 mm.

== Distribution ==
This marine species occurs off the Philippines, New Caledonia, Vanuatu and Papua New Guinea. The species has been recorded from depths of 31 to 50 metres, and has also been observed alive off Moorea, French Polynesia — a locality not previously listed in the species' known range.
