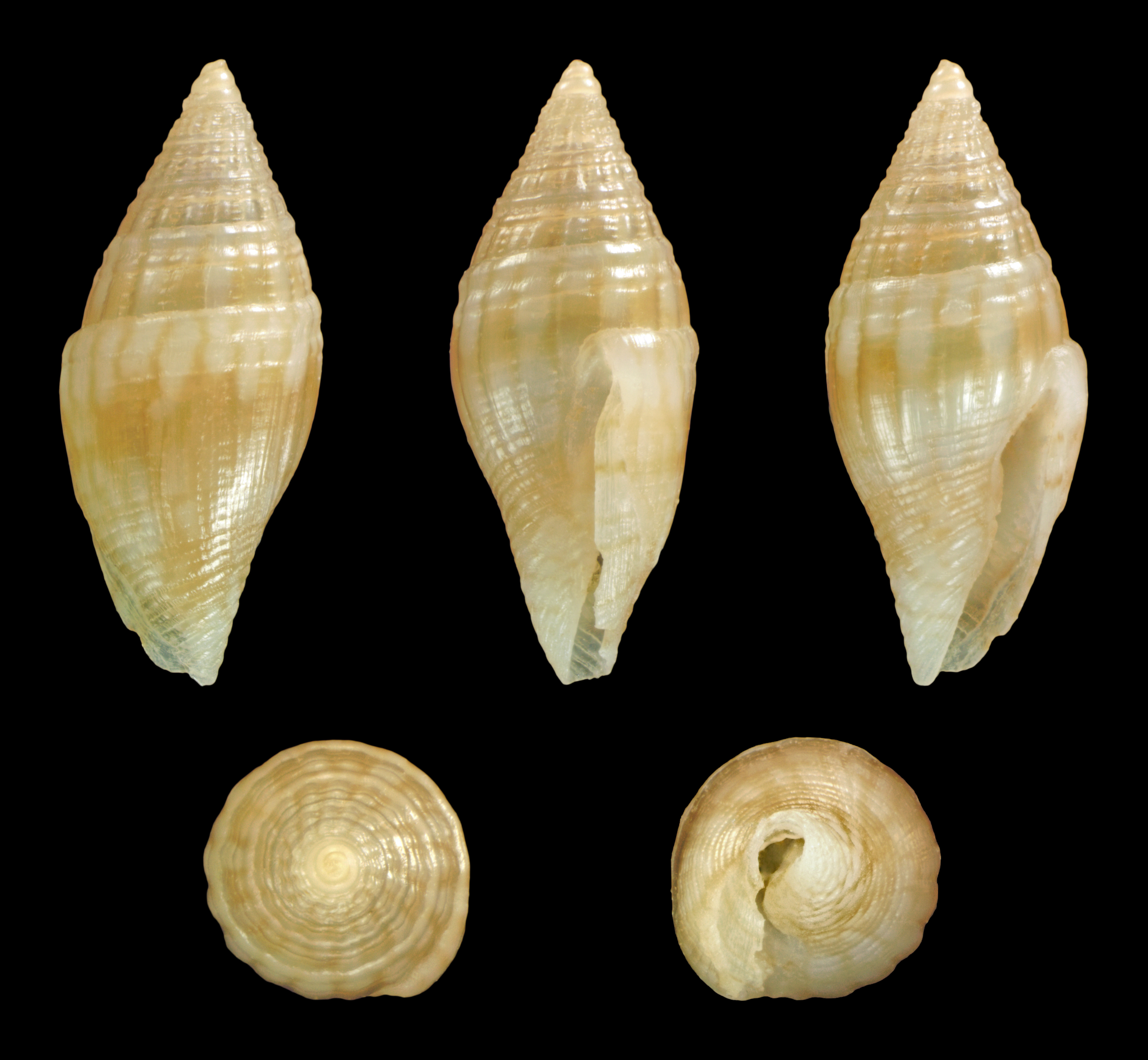

Scientific classification
- Kingdom: Animalia
- Phylum: Mollusca
- Class: Gastropoda
- Subclass: Caenogastropoda
- Order: Neogastropoda
- Superfamily: Conoidea
- Family: Mitromorphidae
- Genus: Anarithma
- Species: A. maesi

Binomial name
- Anarithma maesi Drivas & Jay, 1986

Synonyms
- Metula hindsii Adams, H.G. & A. Adams, 1853; Metula metula (Hinds, 1844); Murex exiguus Garrett, A., 1857

= Anarithma maesi =

Species of gastropod

Anarithma maesi is a species of sea snail, a marine gastropod mollusk in the family Mitromorphidae.

== Description ==
Original description: "Globose, wide, biconical. The length of the narrow aperture is the same as the height of the spire. The sculpture consists of 15 axial plicae per whorl, overcrossed by spiral cords, 11 on the body whorl, followed by 11 more, slightly stronger and more widely spaced on the base. There are 4 riblets on the penultimate whorl, 2 on the preceding whorl, while the earlier whorls have only the two strongest cords. The protoconch is conical, smooth and brown and is made up of three and a half to four whorls. The shell is entirely pale brown, with a whitish spiral band on the upper part of the body whorl. The holotype is 4 mm in height and 2.1 mm in width. The size varies from 4 to 4.6 mm. The species is quite similar to Anarithma metula, from which it differs by its brown protoconch."

The length of the shell attains 5 mm.

== Type material ==
"The holotype will be deposited in the Museum d'Histoire Naturelle in Paris, and two paratypes in the Natal Museum, South Africa."

== Distribution ==
This marine species occurs off Réunion

== Habitat ==
"It is rare, up till now always found dead in hand-dredged muddy black sand,
at depths ranging from 16 to 80 m., but mostly at 40 m."
