= Mitromorpha brevispira =

Scientific classification
- Kingdom: Animalia
- Phylum: Mollusca
- Class: Gastropoda
- Subclass: Caenogastropoda
- Order: Neogastropoda
- Superfamily: Conoidea
- Family: Mitromorphidae
- Genus: Mitromorpha
- Species: M. brevispira

Binomial name
- Mitromorpha brevispira Kilburn, 1986

Synonyms
- Mitromorpha (Mitrolumna) brevispira Kilburn, 1986

Species of gastropod

Mitromorpha brevispira is a species of sea snail, a marine gastropod mollusk in the family Mitromorphidae.

== Description ==
The length of the shell attains 3.9 mm, its diameter 1.9 mm.

== Distribution ==
This marine species occurs off Transkei, South Africa.
