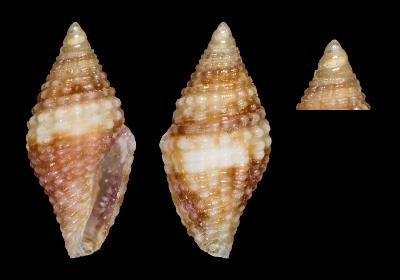
- Shell of Anarithma pylei (holotype in MNHN, Paris)

Scientific classification
- Kingdom: Animalia
- Phylum: Mollusca
- Class: Gastropoda
- Subclass: Caenogastropoda
- Order: Neogastropoda
- Superfamily: Conoidea
- Family: Mitromorphidae
- Genus: Anarithma
- Species: A. pylei

Binomial name
- Anarithma pylei (Chino & Stahlschmidt, 2014)

Synonyms
- Mitromorpha pylei Chino & Stahlschmidt, 2014 (original combination)

= Anarithma pylei =

Species of gastropod

Anarithma pylei is a species of sea snail, a marine gastropod mollusk in the family Mitromorphidae.

== Description ==
The length of the shell attains 3.6 mm.

== Distribution ==
This marine species occurs off the Vanuatu.
