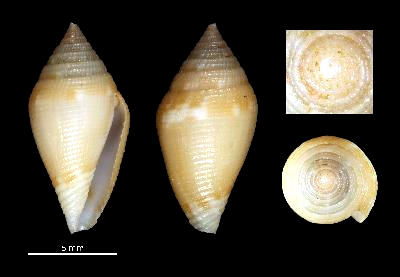
- Apertural view of a shell of Lovellona biconus (paratype in the MNHN, Paris)

Conservation status
- Data Deficient (IUCN 3.1)

Scientific classification
- Kingdom: Animalia
- Phylum: Mollusca
- Class: Gastropoda
- Subclass: Caenogastropoda
- Order: Neogastropoda
- Superfamily: Conoidea
- Family: Mitromorphidae
- Genus: Lovellona
- Species: L. biconus

Binomial name
- Lovellona biconus Chino & Stahlschmidt, 2009

= Lovellona biconus =

Species of gastropod

Lovellona biconus is a species of sea snail, a marine gastropod mollusk in the family Mitromorphidae.

== Description ==
The shell size varies between 8 to 11 millimetres (0.31 to 0.43 in).

== Distribution ==
This marine species occurs off the Philippines and Japan.
