= Mitromorpha smithi =

Scientific classification
- Kingdom: Animalia
- Phylum: Mollusca
- Class: Gastropoda
- Subclass: Caenogastropoda
- Order: Neogastropoda
- Superfamily: Conoidea
- Family: Mitromorphidae
- Genus: Mitromorpha
- Species: M. smithi

Binomial name
- Mitromorpha smithi Dautzenberg & Fischer, 1896

Synonyms
- Mitrolumna smithi (Dautzenberg & Fischer H., 1896); Mitromorpha (Mitrolumna) dalli (Dautzenberg & Fischer H., 1896)

Species of gastropod

Mitromorpha smithi is a species of sea snail, a marine gastropod mollusk in the family Mitromorphidae.

== Description ==
The shell size reaches 7 mm.

== Distribution ==
This species occurs in the Atlantic Ocean off the Azores.
