= Mitromorpha axiscalpta =

Scientific classification
- Kingdom: Animalia
- Phylum: Mollusca
- Class: Gastropoda
- Subclass: Caenogastropoda
- Order: Neogastropoda
- Superfamily: Conoidea
- Family: Mitromorphidae
- Genus: Mitromorpha
- Species: M. axiscalpta

Binomial name
- Mitromorpha axiscalpta (Verco, 1909)

Synonyms
- Mitrithara axiscalpta (Verco, 1909); Mitromorpha alba var. axiscalpta, Verco, 1909 (original rank)

Species of gastropod

Mitromorpha axiscalpta is a species of sea snail, a marine gastropod mollusk in the family Mitromorphidae.

== Description ==
(Original description) It has the shape of Mitromorpha alba (Petterd, 1879) but has crowded axial incisions granulating the spirals. It has also three spiral rows of small, square brown spots on the body whorl, one just below the suture, but not on the first spiral as in some of the typical M. alba; a second starting just above the aperture and winding round to just above the middle of the outer lip; a third beginning just above the two nodules on the outer lip and running over the back of the aperture. The upper two rows appear in the spire whorls. Sometimes the shell is flamed with very light-brown between the spots axially.

== Distribution ==
This marine species is endemic to Australia and occurs off South Australia.
