= Maorimorpha secunda =

Scientific classification
- Kingdom: Animalia
- Phylum: Mollusca
- Class: Gastropoda
- Subclass: Caenogastropoda
- Order: Neogastropoda
- Superfamily: Conoidea
- Family: Mitromorphidae
- Genus: Maorimorpha
- Species: M. secunda

Binomial name
- Maorimorpha secunda Powell, 1942

Species of gastropod

Maorimorpha secunda is a species of sea snail, a marine gastropod mollusk in the family Mitromorphidae. in the superfamily Conoidea. The genus Maorimorpha was established by A. W. B. Powell in 1939.

== Description ==
The length of the shell attains 4.6 mm, its diameter 1.7 mm.

== Distribution ==
This marine species is endemic to New Zealand, and occurs off South Island at a depth of 130 m.
