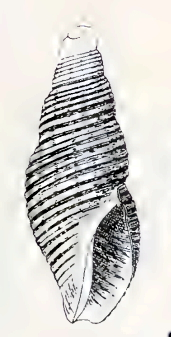
- Original image of a shell of Maorimorpha suteri

Scientific classification
- Kingdom: Animalia
- Phylum: Mollusca
- Class: Gastropoda
- Subclass: Caenogastropoda
- Order: Neogastropoda
- Superfamily: Conoidea
- Family: Mitromorphidae
- Genus: Maorimorpha
- Species: M. suteri

Binomial name
- Maorimorpha suteri (Murdoch, 1905)

Synonyms
- Mitromorpha suteri Murdoch, 1905 (original combination)

= Maorimorpha suteri =

Species of gastropod

Maorimorpha suteri is a species of sea snail, a marine gastropod mollusk in the family Mitromorphidae.

== Description ==
The length of the shell attains 4.6 mm, its diameter 1.7 mm.

(Original description) The small shell is fusiform, somewhat thin, with fine spiral and usually somewhat obsolete longitudinal riblets. Its colour is light reddish-brown, sometimes a pale band around the periphery and occasionally a narrow darker band at the sutures. Its 5 whorls are lightly rounded, the last longer than the spire. The protoconch consists of two whorls, somewhat globose, smooth and polished. The apical whorl is oblique to the succeeding whorl.

Sculpture : The penultimate whorl shows six to seven and the body whorl sixteen to twenty spiral riblets, seven or eight of which are in front of the aperture. They are slightly variable in strength, some in breadth equal to the interspaces, others rather narrower. Also an occasional small thread here and there arises in the interspaces. The longitudinal ribs are irregular, low and rounded, more distinct on the spire, and frequently obsolete. The growth striae are irregular, somewhat marked, and frequently cutting up the spirals into minute gemmules. The sutures are impressed, usually margined with a wider riblet. The aperture is somewhat narrow, rather longer than the spire. The outer lip is thin and a little flattened. The posterior sinus is broad and well marked. The columella is almost straight, concave and lightly callused. The siphonal canal is short and broad.

== Distribution ==
This marine species is endemic to New Zealand occurs off Stewart Island and Foveaux Strait.
