= Mitromorpha apollinis =

Scientific classification
- Kingdom: Animalia
- Phylum: Mollusca
- Class: Gastropoda
- Subclass: Caenogastropoda
- Order: Neogastropoda
- Superfamily: Conoidea
- Family: Mitromorphidae
- Genus: Mitromorpha
- Species: M. apollinis

Binomial name
- Mitromorpha apollinis Thiele, 1925

Synonyms
- Mitromorpha (Mitrolumna) apollinis Thiele, 1925

Species of gastropod

Mitromorpha apollinis is a species of sea snail, a marine gastropod mollusk in the family Mitromorphidae.

== Distribution ==
This marine species occurs off the Agulhas Bank, South Africa
