= Mitrellatoma angustata =

Scientific classification
- Kingdom: Animalia
- Phylum: Mollusca
- Class: Gastropoda
- Subclass: Caenogastropoda
- Order: Neogastropoda
- Superfamily: Conoidea
- Family: Mitromorphidae
- Genus: †Mitrellatoma
- Species: †M. angustata

Binomial name
- †Mitrellatoma angustata (Hutton, 1885)

Synonyms
- † Columbella angustata Hutton, 1885

Extinct species of gastropod

Mitrellatoma angustata is an extinct species of sea snail, a marine gastropod mollusk in the family Mitromorphidae.

== Description ==
(Original description) The shell shows narrow spiral grooves; seven on the penultimate and fifteen on the body whorl.

== Distribution ==
This extinct marine species is endemic to New Zealand.
