= Mitromorpha nodilirata =

Scientific classification
- Kingdom: Animalia
- Phylum: Mollusca
- Class: Gastropoda
- Subclass: Caenogastropoda
- Order: Neogastropoda
- Superfamily: Conoidea
- Family: Mitromorphidae
- Genus: Mitromorpha
- Species: M. nodilirata

Binomial name
- Mitromorpha nodilirata Kilburn, 1986

Synonyms
- Mitromorpha (Mitrolumna) nodilirata Kilburn, 1986

Species of gastropod

Mitromorpha nodilirata is a species of sea snail, a marine gastropod mollusk in the family Mitromorphidae. This species was first described in 1986.

== Description ==
The shape of the shell is narrow and biconic and the length of the shell attains 5.5 mm, its diameter is 2.2 mm.
