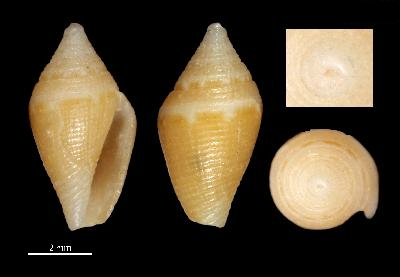
- Shell of Lovellona elongata (paratype in MNHN, Paris)

Scientific classification
- Kingdom: Animalia
- Phylum: Mollusca
- Class: Gastropoda
- Subclass: Caenogastropoda
- Order: Neogastropoda
- Superfamily: Conoidea
- Family: Mitromorphidae
- Genus: Lovellona
- Species: L. elongata

Binomial name
- Lovellona elongata Chino & Stahlschmidt, 2009

= Lovellona elongata =

Species of gastropod

Lovellona elongata is a species of sea snail, a marine gastropod mollusk in the family Mitromorphidae.

== Description ==
The shell size attains 7.5 mm.

== Distribution ==
This marine species occurs off Wakayama, Honshu, Japan.
