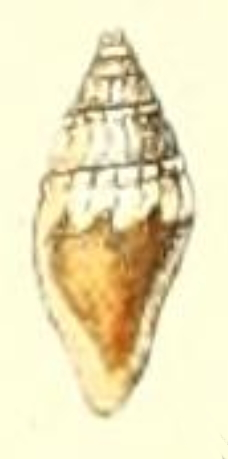
- Shell of Anarithma lachryma (holotype)

Scientific classification
- Kingdom: Animalia
- Phylum: Mollusca
- Class: Gastropoda
- Subclass: Caenogastropoda
- Order: Neogastropoda
- Superfamily: Conoidea
- Family: Mitromorphidae
- Genus: Anarithma
- Species: A. lachryma

Binomial name
- Anarithma lachryma (Reeve, 1845)

Synonyms
- Mitra lachryma Reeve, 1845 (original combination)

= Anarithma lachryma =

Species of gastropod

Anarithma lachryma, common name the tear mitre, is a species of sea snail, a marine gastropod mollusk in the family Mitromorphidae.

== Description ==
(Original description) The shell is ovate and tapers at both ends. It is rather thin, with a short, somewhat obtuse spire. Its whorls are longitudinally very finely ribbed at the upper part and are transversely marked with obsolete, raised striae. Typically white, the shell is uniquely adorned at the back with a large orange-brown blotch. The columella features two or three nearly obsolete plaits, and the outer lip is effused.

== Distribution ==
This marine species occurs in the Mozambique Channel.
