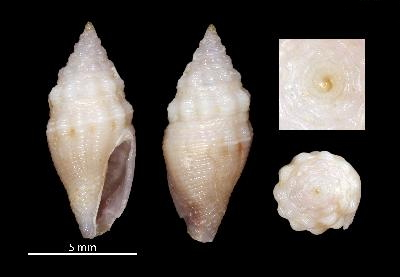
- Shells of Anarithma poppei (paratype in the MNHN, Paris)

Scientific classification
- Kingdom: Animalia
- Phylum: Mollusca
- Class: Gastropoda
- Subclass: Caenogastropoda
- Order: Neogastropoda
- Superfamily: Conoidea
- Family: Mitromorphidae
- Genus: Anarithma
- Species: A. poppei

Binomial name
- Anarithma poppei (Chino & Stahlschmidt, 2009)

Synonyms
- Mitromorpha poppei Chino & Stahlschmidt, 2009 (original combination)

= Anarithma poppei =

Species of sea snail

Anarithma poppei is a species of sea snail, found in the indomalayan region, a marine gastropod mollusk in the family Mitromorphidae. The original species name for the Anarithma poppei was the Mitromorpha poppei Chino.

== Description ==
The length of the shell attains to 6 to 12 millimetres (0.24 to 0.47 in). Anarithma poppei has a light yellow or tan tint. The shells morphology is suitable for environment tidal depths of 50 to 150 metres (160 to 490 ft).

The surface description of the shell includes frequent grid ribs forming a strong costal sculpture, interjected by fine spiral lines that create a detailed, beaded look on the whorls.

== Distribution ==
This marine species occurs off the Philippines and Okinawa(and broader Southern Japan).
