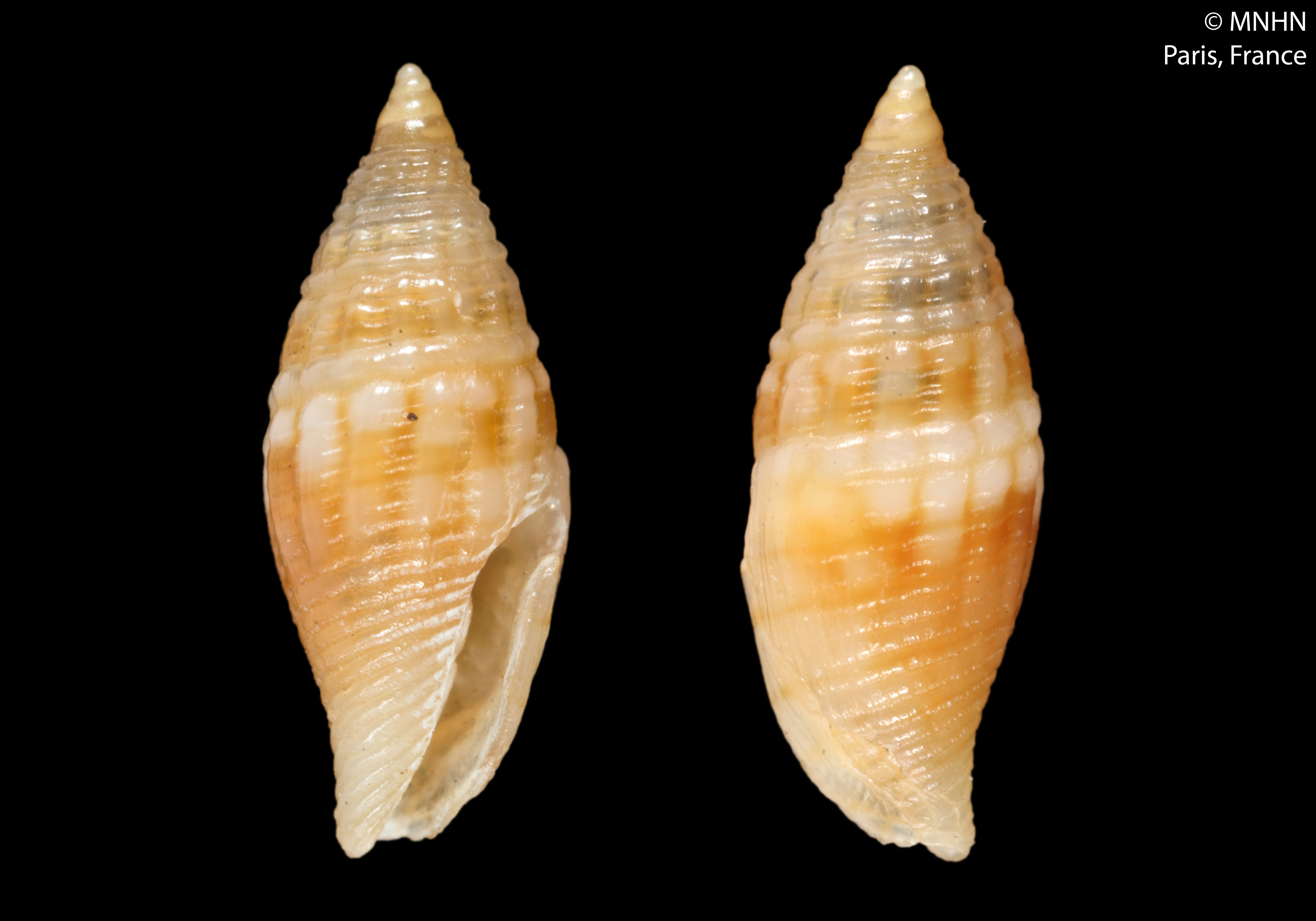
- Anarithma maesi

Scientific classification
- Kingdom: Animalia
- Phylum: Mollusca
- Class: Gastropoda
- Subclass: Caenogastropoda
- Order: Neogastropoda
- Superfamily: Conoidea
- Family: Mitromorphidae
- Genus: Anarithma; Iredale, 1916

Type species
- Clavatula metula Hinds, 1843

Species
- See text

Synonyms
- Citharopsis Pease, 1868

= Anarithma =

Genus of gastropods

Anarithma is a small genus of sea snails, marine gastropod mollusks in the family Mitromorphidae, in the superfamily Conoidea the cone snails and their allies.

== Species ==
- Anarithma alphonsiana (Hervier, 1900)
- Anarithma ambigua (Chino & Stahlschmidt, 2009)
- Anarithma aurantioquadrata Horro, Gori, Rosado & Rolán, 2024
- Anarithma aurea F. Boyer & Renda, 2022
- Anarithma borbonica F. Boyer & Renda, 2022
- Anarithma bulbosa F. Boyer, 2022
- Anarithma dorcas Kuroda & Oyama, 1971
- Anarithma fuscafenestrata (Chino & Stahlschmidt, 2014)
- Anarithma fusiformis (Chino & Stahlschmidt, 2009)
- Anarithma granulata (Chino & Stahlschmidt, 2009)
- Anarithma iki (Kay, 1979)
- Anarithma inornata (Hervier, 1900)
- Anarithma iozona (Hervier, 1900)
- Anarithma johntuckeri Wiedrick, 2025
- Anarithma lachryma (Reeve, 1845)
- Anarithma maculafusca Wiedrick, 2025
- Anarithma metula (Hinds, 1843)
- Anarithma nigricingulata (Chino & Stahlschmidt, 2009)
- Anarithma pamila (Duclos, 1848)
- Anarithma poppei (Chino & Stahlschmidt, 2009)
- Anarithma punctata (Chino & Stahlschmidt, 2009)
- Anarithma purpurata (Chino & Stahlschmidt, 2009)
- Anarithma pylei (Chino & Stahlschmidt, 2014)
- Anarithma rubrimaculata (Chino & Stahlschmidt, 2009)
- Anarithma salisburyi (Cernohorsky, 1978)
- Anarithma stepheni (Melvill & Standen, 1897)
- Anarithma sublachryma (Hervier, 1900)
- Anarithma tenuicolor (Chino & Stahlschmidt, 2009)

Species brought into synonymy

- Anarithma alphonsiana (Hervier, 1900): synonym of Mitromorpha alphonsiana (Hervier, 1900)
- Anarithma dibolos K.H. Barnard, 1964: synonym of Anarithma metula (Hinds, 1843)
- Anarithma drivas] Chang, 1995: synonym of Mitromorpha drivasi (Z.-G. Chang, 1995) (superseded combination)
- Anarithma garrettii W.H. Pease, 1860: synonym of Anarithma metula (Hinds, 1843)
- Anarithma lachryma L.A. Reeve, 1845: synonym of Anarithma metula (Hinds, 1843)
- Anarithma maesi Drivas & Jay, 1986: synonym of Anarithma sublachryma (Hervier, 1900) (junior subjective synonym)
- Anarithma melvilli F. Boyer, 2022: synonym of Anarithma stepheni (Melvill & Standen, 1897)
- Anarithma pacei Melvill, J.C. & R. Standen, 1897 (renamed): synonym of Anarithma stepheni (Melvill & Standen, 1897)
- Anarithma pamila P.L. Duclos in J.C. Chenu, 1848: synonym of Anarithma metula (Hinds, 1843)
- Anarithma pusiola R.W. Dunker, 1871: synonym of Anarithma metula (Hinds, 1843)
- Anarithma salisburyi (Cernohorsky, 1978): synonym of Mitromorpha salisburyi (Cernohorsky, 1978)
- Anarithma stepheni (Melvill & Standen, 1897): synonym of Anarithma metula (Hinds, 1843) (junior subjective synonym)
