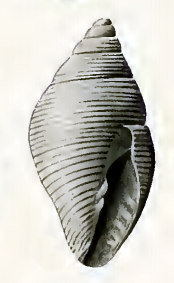
- Shell of Mitromorpha alba

Scientific classification
- Kingdom: Animalia
- Phylum: Mollusca
- Class: Gastropoda
- Subclass: Caenogastropoda
- Order: Neogastropoda
- Superfamily: Conoidea
- Family: Mitromorphidae
- Genus: Mitromorpha
- Species: M. alba

Binomial name
- Mitromorpha alba (Petterd, 1879)

Synonyms
- Columbella alba Petterd, 1879; Mitrithara alba Petterd, 1879; Mitromorpha flindersi Pritchard, G.B. & J.H. Gatliff, 1899

= Mitromorpha alba =

Species of gastropod

Mitromorpha alba is a species of sea snail, a marine gastropod mollusk in the family Mitromorphidae.

The variety Mitromorpha alba var. axiscalpta Verco, 1909is a synonym of Mitromorpha axiscalpta Verco, 1909 (original rank)

== Description ==
The length of the shell attains 4.4 mm.

The small, solid shell is biconical to cylindro-fusiform. It contains four whorls. The protoconch is blunt. The colour is white. The whorls show close revolving cords, sometimes decussated with radial riblets. No varix. The outer lip is thin. The sinus is evanescent. The columella is incrassate, with an indistinct single or double plication. The siphonal canal is wide and short,. The aperture is lyrate within.

== Distribution ==
This marine species occurs off Tasmania, Australia, and off Taiwan
