= Cymakra dubia =

Scientific classification
- Kingdom: Animalia
- Phylum: Mollusca
- Class: Gastropoda
- Subclass: Caenogastropoda
- Order: Neogastropoda
- Superfamily: Conoidea
- Family: Mitromorphidae
- Genus: Cymakra
- Species: C. dubia

Binomial name
- Cymakra dubia (Olsson & McGinty, 1958)

Synonyms
- Nassarina dubia Olsson & McGinty, 1958 (original combination)

Species of gastropod

Cymakra dubia is a species of sea snail, a marine gastropod mollusk in the family Mitromorphidae.

== Description ==
The shell is small, attaining a length of 2.5–6.2 mm. Detailed morphological characteristics, such as whorl count and ornamentation, are not well-documented in recent literature beyond the original description.

== Distribution ==
This marine species occurs off Honduras, Guadeloupe, Bonaire and Aruba.
