= Anarithma fusiformis =

Scientific classification
- Kingdom: Animalia
- Phylum: Mollusca
- Class: Gastropoda
- Subclass: Caenogastropoda
- Order: Neogastropoda
- Superfamily: Conoidea
- Family: Mitromorphidae
- Genus: Anarithma
- Species: A. fusiformis

Binomial name
- Anarithma fusiformis (Chino & Stahlschmidt, 2009)

Synonyms
- Mitromorpha fusiformis Chino & Stahlschmidt, 2009 (original combination)

Species of gastropod

Anarithma fusiformis is a species of sea snail, a marine gastropod mollusk in the family Mitromorphidae.

== Description ==
The length of the shell attains 12.5 mm.

== Distribution ==
This marine species occurs off the Philippines.
