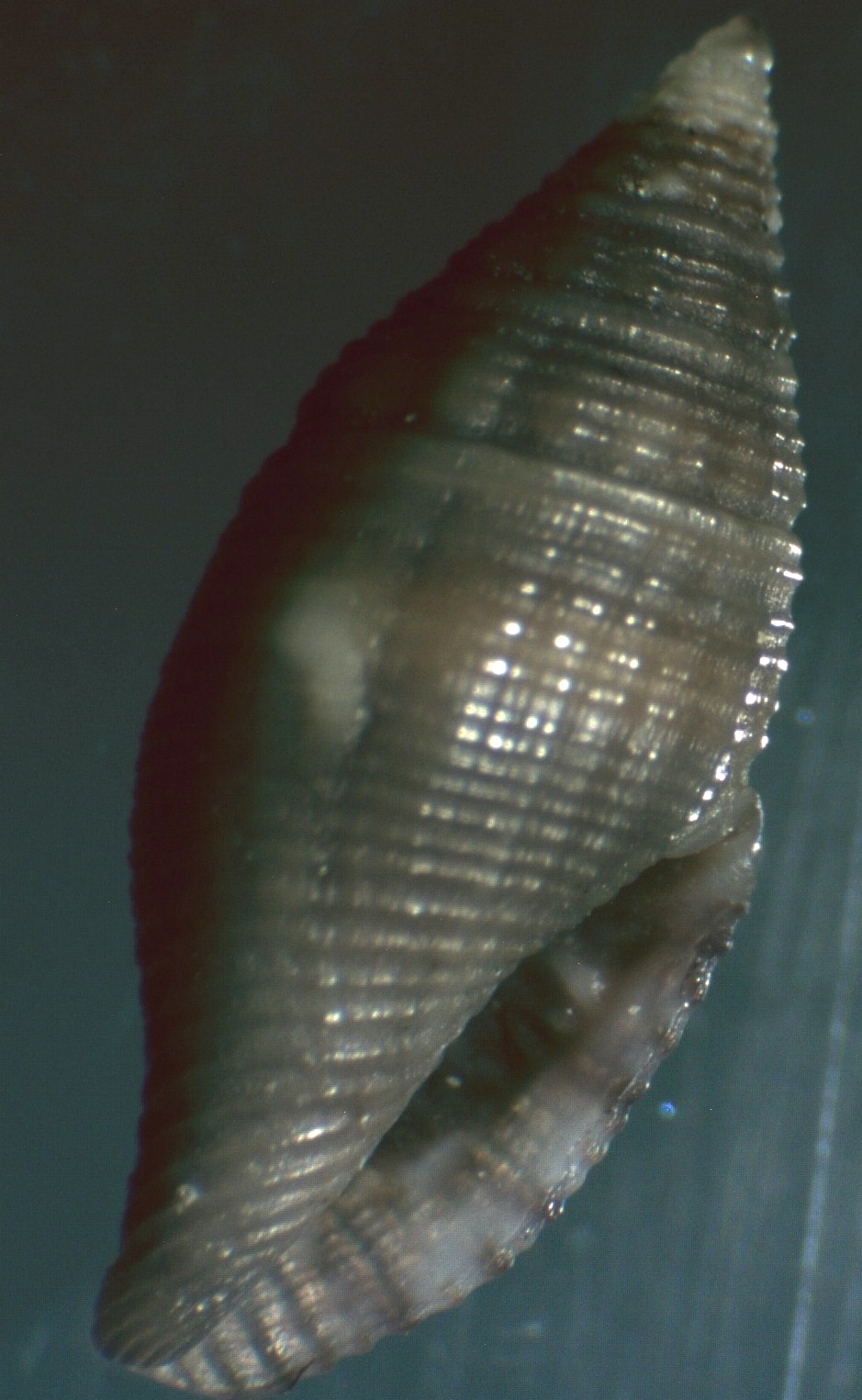
- Shell of Lovellona peaseana

Scientific classification
- Kingdom: Animalia
- Phylum: Mollusca
- Class: Gastropoda
- Subclass: Caenogastropoda
- Order: Neogastropoda
- Superfamily: Conoidea
- Family: Mitromorphidae
- Genus: Lovellona
- Species: L. peaseana

Binomial name
- Lovellona peaseana Finlay H.J., 1927

Synonyms
- Conus fusiformis Pease, 1861 (invalid: junior homonym of Conus fusiformis Lamarck, 1810; .Conus parvus Pease, 1868, is a replacement name); Conus parvus Pease, 1868 (invalid: junior homonym of Conus parvus I. Lea, 1833; Lovellona peaseana is a replacement name); Mitromorpha peaseana (Finlay, 1927)

= Lovellona peaseana =

Species of gastropod

Lovellona peaseana is a species of sea snail, a marine gastropod mollusk in the family Mitromorphidae.

== Description ==
The length of the shell varies between 6.5 mm and 8 mm.

== Distribution ==
This marine species occurs off the Philippines, the Solomon Islands, and Hawaii.
