= Itia clatrata =

Scientific classification
- Kingdom: Animalia
- Phylum: Mollusca
- Class: Gastropoda
- Subclass: Caenogastropoda
- Order: Neogastropoda
- Superfamily: Conoidea
- Family: Mitromorphidae
- Genus: †Itia
- Species: †I. clatrata

Binomial name
- †Itia clatrata Marwick, 1931

Extinct species of gastropod

Itia clatrata is an extinct species of sea snail, a marine gastropod mollusk in the family Mitromorphidae.

== Distribution ==
This extinct marine species was found in Tertiary strata in New Zealand.
