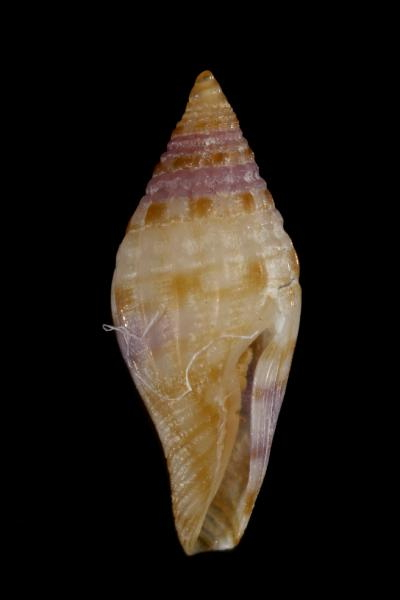
- Shell of Anarithma alphonsiana (specimen at MNHN, Paris)

Scientific classification
- Kingdom: Animalia
- Phylum: Mollusca
- Class: Gastropoda
- Subclass: Caenogastropoda
- Order: Neogastropoda
- Superfamily: Conoidea
- Family: Mitromorphidae
- Genus: Anarithma
- Species: A. alphonsiana

Binomial name
- Anarithma alphonsiana (Hervier, 1899)

Synonyms
- Columbella alphonsiana Hervier, 1899 (original combination); Mitromorpha alphonsiana (Hervier, 1900)

= Anarithma alphonsiana =

Species of gastropod

Anarithma alphonsiana is a species of sea snail, a marine gastropod mollusk in the family Mitromorphidae.

== Description ==
The length of the shell attains 6 mm, its diameter 2.75 mm.

The small shell has a biconic shape and an acuminate apex. The shell has a white color. The middle of the whorls is ornated with white and yellow dots, alternating on the ribs, below two series of granules, cut by subsutural striae. Those two rows of dots on the superior part have a violet-rose color only on the first two whorls. This color nuance changes on the body whorl. Here the two upper rows of dots are white. The shell contains 7–8 whorls, of which 2–3 smooth and milky white whorls in the protoconch. The others are convex with an indistinct suture. The longitudinal ribs are dense and are crossed by two transverse striae on each whorl, subsutarally sulcate and decussate by small lirae. The superior part of the narrow, oblique body whorl is slightly rounded, the inferior part attenuate and elongate. The superior part of the columella is concave, inflated at the middle. The convex outer lip is incrassate and sinuate at the suture and has a sharp margin.

== Distribution ==
This marine species occurs off New Caledonia and the Tuamotu Islands.
