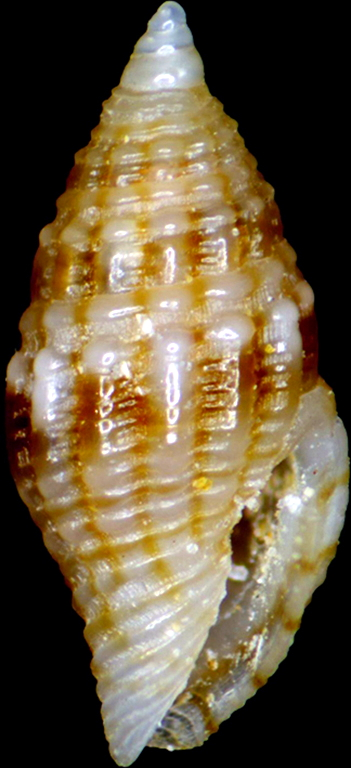
- Shells of Anarithma bulbosa (holotype in the MNHN, Paris)

Scientific classification
- Kingdom: Animalia
- Phylum: Mollusca
- Class: Gastropoda
- Subclass: Caenogastropoda
- Order: Neogastropoda
- Superfamily: Conoidea
- Family: Mitromorphidae
- Genus: Anarithma
- Species: A. bulbosa

Binomial name
- Anarithma bulbosa F. Boyer, 2022

= Anarithma bulbosa =

Species of gastropod

Anarithma bulbosa is a species of sea snail, a marine gastropod mollusk in the family Mitromorphidae.

== Description ==
The length of the shell attains 3.9 mm.

== Distribution ==
This marine species occurs off the Philippines.
