= Itia =

Scientific classification
- Kingdom: Animalia
- Phylum: Mollusca
- Class: Gastropoda
- Subclass: Caenogastropoda
- Order: Neogastropoda
- Superfamily: Conoidea
- Family: Mitromorphidae
- Genus: †Itia; Marwick, 1931

Type species
- † Itia clatrata Marwick, 1931

Species
- See text

Extinct genus of sea snail

Itia is an extinct genus of sea snails, marine gastropod mollusks in the family Mitromorphidae.

== Species ==
According to the World Register of Marine Species (WoRMS), the following species with a valid name are included within the genus Itia:

- † Itia clatrata Marwick, 1931

Synonymized species

- Itia benthicola Dell, 1962: synonym of Mitromorpha benthicola (Dell, 1962) (original combination)
