= Arielia mitriformis =

Scientific classification
- Kingdom: Animalia
- Phylum: Mollusca
- Class: Gastropoda
- Subclass: Caenogastropoda
- Order: Neogastropoda
- Family: Mitromorphidae
- Genus: Arielia
- Species: A. mitriformis

Binomial name
- Arielia mitriformis Shasky, 1961

Synonyms
- Mitromorpha (Mitrolumna) mitriformis (Shasky, 1961)

Species of gastropod

Arielia mitriformis is a species of sea snail, a marine gastropod mollusk in the family Mitromorphidae.

== Distribution ==
This species occurs in the Pacific Ocean off the Galapagos Islands and in the Sea of Cortez, Western Mexico
