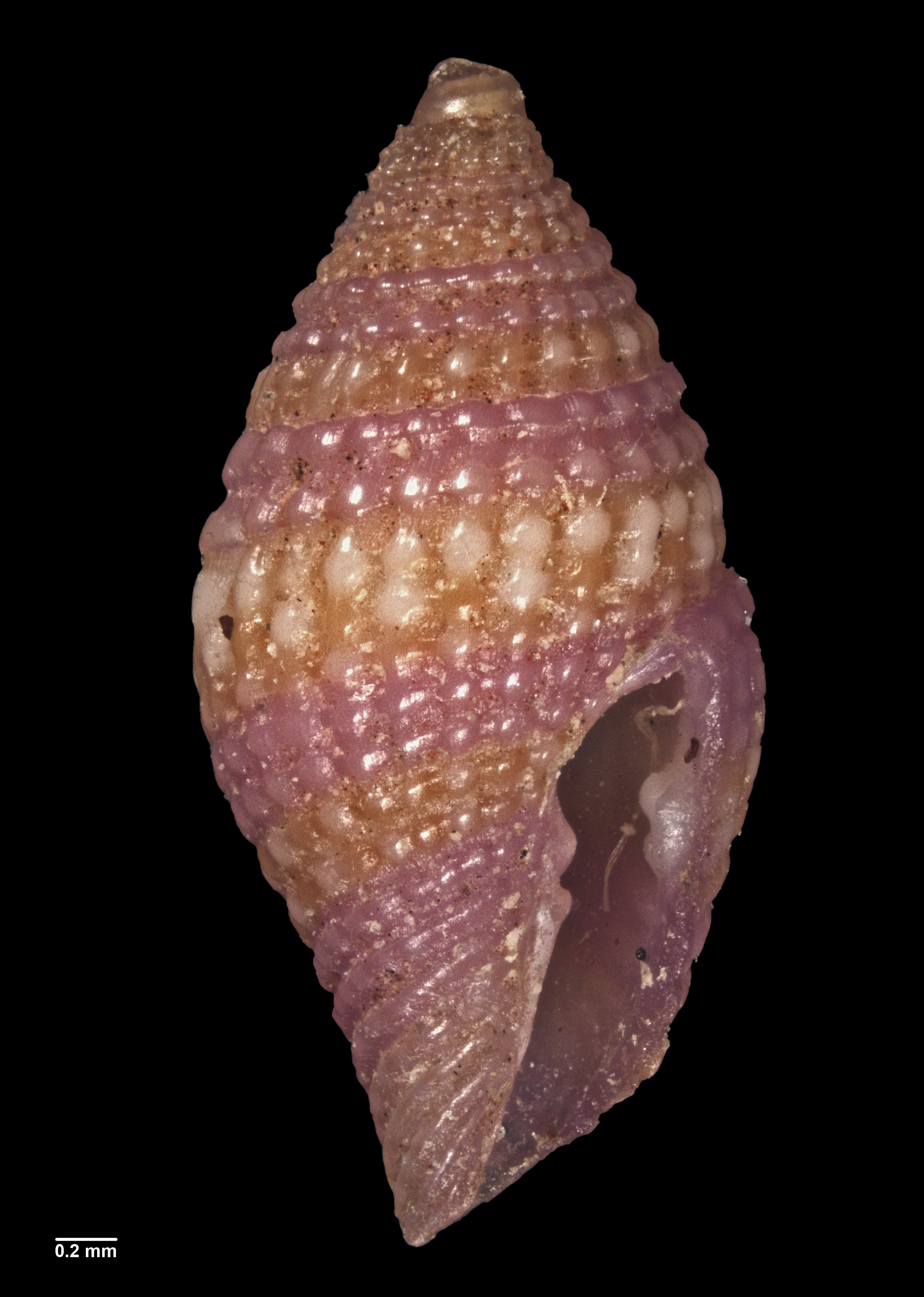
- Shell of Anarithma salisburyi (holotype from the Auckland War Memorial Museum)

Scientific classification
- Kingdom: Animalia
- Phylum: Mollusca
- Class: Gastropoda
- Subclass: Caenogastropoda
- Order: Neogastropoda
- Family: Mitromorphidae
- Genus: Anarithma
- Species: A. salisburyi

Binomial name
- Anarithma salisburyi (Cernohorsky, 1978)

Synonyms
- Mitrolumna salisburyi Cernohorsky, 1978 (original description); Mitromorpha salisburyi (Cernohorsky, 1978)

= Anarithma salisburyi =

Species of gastropod

Anarithma salisburyi is a species of sea snail; a marine gastropod mollusk in the family Mitromorphidae.

== Description ==
The length of the ovate-biconic shell varies between 3 mm and 4 mm; its diameter is 2 mm.

== Distribution ==
This marine species occurs off Hawaii and the Tuamotu Islands.
