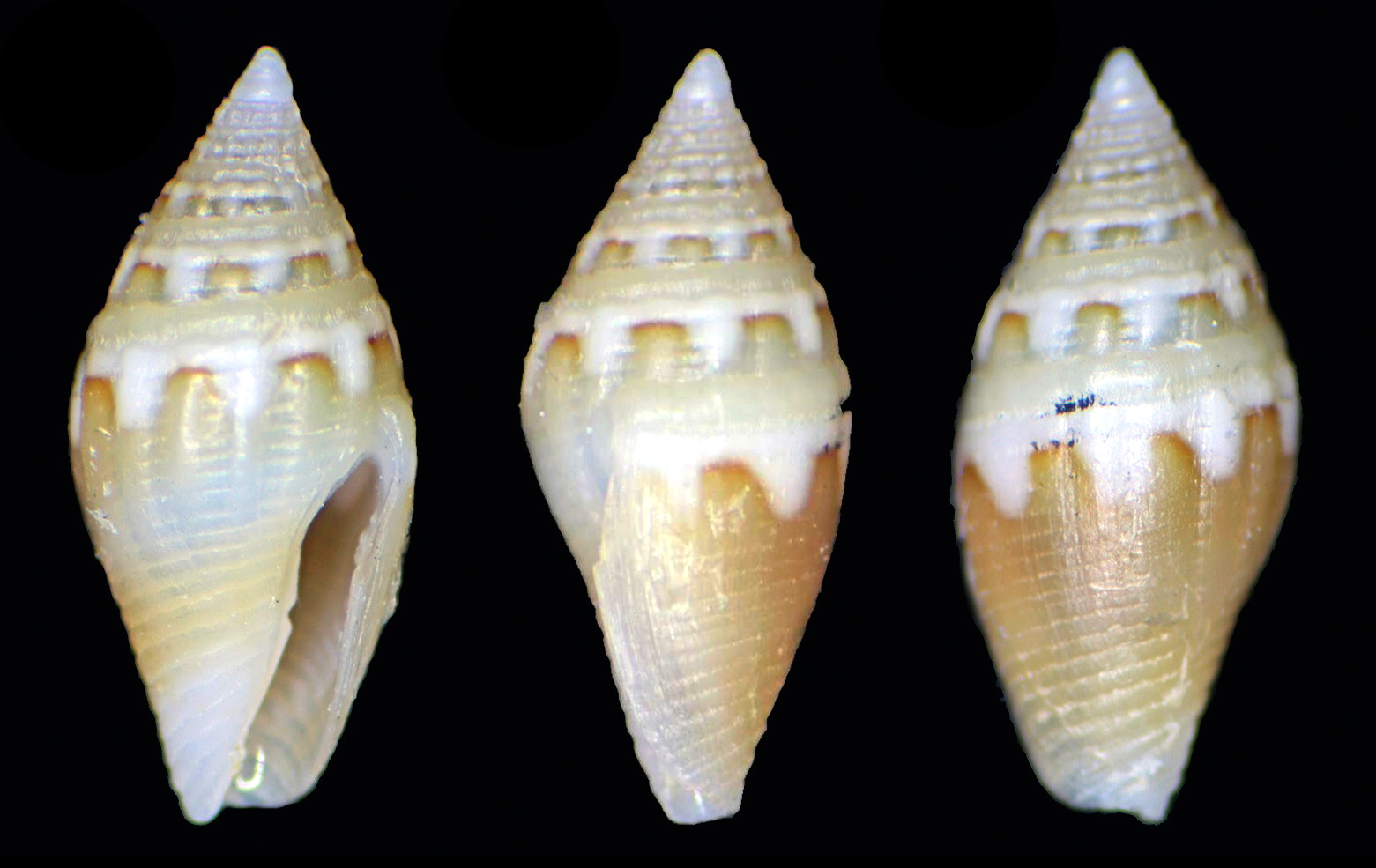
- Shells of Anarithma aurantioquadrata (holotype in the MNHN, Paris)

Scientific classification
- Kingdom: Animalia
- Phylum: Mollusca
- Class: Gastropoda
- Subclass: Caenogastropoda
- Order: Neogastropoda
- Superfamily: Conoidea
- Family: Mitromorphidae
- Genus: Anarithma
- Species: A. aurantioquadrata

Binomial name
- Anarithma aurantioquadrata Horro, Gori, Rosado & Rolán, 2024

= Anarithma aurantioquadrata =

Species of gastropod

Anarithma aurantioquadrata is a species of sea snail, a marine gastropod mollusk in the family Mitromorphidae.

== Description ==
The length of the shell attains 4.7 mm.

== Distribution ==
This marine species occurs in the Mozambique Channel.
