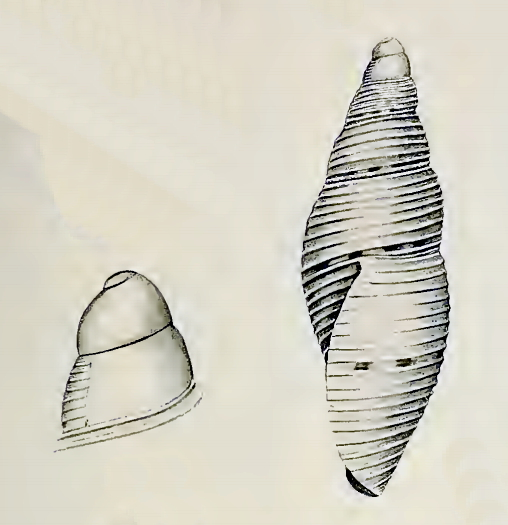
- Shell and protoconch of Mitromorpha angusta

Scientific classification
- Kingdom: Animalia
- Phylum: Mollusca
- Class: Gastropoda
- Subclass: Caenogastropoda
- Order: Neogastropoda
- Superfamily: Conoidea
- Family: Mitromorphidae
- Genus: Mitromorpha
- Species: M. angusta

Binomial name
- Mitromorpha angusta Verco, 1909

Synonyms
- Mitromorpha (Mitrolumna) angusta Verco, 1909

= Mitromorpha angusta =

Species of gastropod

Mitromorpha angusta is a species of sea snail, a marine gastropod mollusk in the family Mitromorphidae.

== Description ==
The length of the shell attains 5.7 mm, its diameter 2.1 mm.

(Original description) The narrow shell has a fusiform shape. It contains 6 whorls, including the protoconch of 2 smooth convex whorls, with simple suture. The whorls of the spire are convex, with simple suture. The body whorl is tapering anteriorly. The aperture is narrowly oval, scarcely contracted behind, widely open in front, no siphonal canal, only channelled. The outer lip is thin, simple, uniformly convex in profile. There is no distinct sinus posteriorly. The inner lip is slightly thickened on the straight columella, with two faint plaits or nodules. The colour of the shell is white, with a spiral row of some seven brown spots, showing just above the suture, and winding to the middle of the outer lip.

== Distribution ==
This marine species is endemic to Australia and occurs off South Australia.
