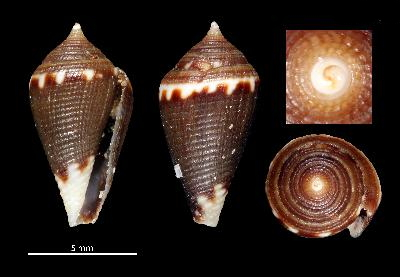
- Shell of Lovellona carbonaria (paratype at MNHN, Paris)

Conservation status
- Data Deficient (IUCN 3.1)

Scientific classification
- Kingdom: Animalia
- Phylum: Mollusca
- Class: Gastropoda
- Subclass: Caenogastropoda
- Order: Neogastropoda
- Superfamily: Conoidea
- Family: Mitromorphidae
- Genus: Lovellona
- Species: L. carbonaria

Binomial name
- Lovellona carbonaria Chino & Stahlschmidt, 2009

= Lovellona carbonaria =

Species of gastropod

Lovellona carbonaria is a species of sea snail, a marine gastropod mollusk in the family Mitromorphidae.

== Description ==
The shell size attains 10 millimetres (0.39 in).

== Distribution ==
This marine species occurs off the Philippines and Japan.
