= Cymakra baileyi =

Scientific classification
- Kingdom: Animalia
- Phylum: Mollusca
- Class: Gastropoda
- Subclass: Caenogastropoda
- Order: Neogastropoda
- Superfamily: Conoidea
- Family: Mitromorphidae
- Genus: Cymakra
- Species: C. baileyi

Binomial name
- Cymakra baileyi McLean & Poorman, 1971

Synonyms
- Mitromorpha baileyi McLean & Poorman, 1971

Species of gastropod

Cymakra baileyi is a species of sea snail, a marine gastropod mollusk in the family Mitromorphidae.

== Distribution ==
This marine species occurs off Cabo San Lucas, Baja California, Mexico.
