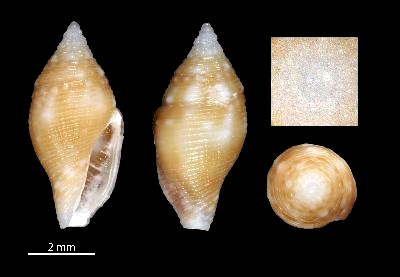
- Shells of Anarithma ambigua (paratype in the MNHN, Paris)

Scientific classification
- Kingdom: Animalia
- Phylum: Mollusca
- Class: Gastropoda
- Subclass: Caenogastropoda
- Order: Neogastropoda
- Superfamily: Conoidea
- Family: Mitromorphidae
- Genus: Anarithma
- Species: A. ambigua

Binomial name
- Anarithma ambigua Chino & Stahlschmidt, 2009

Synonyms
- Mitromorpha ambigua Chino & Stahlschmidt, 2009

= Anarithma ambigua =

Species of gastropod

Anarithma ambigua is a species of sea snail, a marine gastropod mollusk in the family Mitromorphidae.

== Description ==
The length of the shell attains 7.5 mm.

== Distribution ==
This marine species occurs off the Philippines and Okinawa.
