= Cymakra granata =

Scientific classification
- Kingdom: Animalia
- Phylum: Mollusca
- Class: Gastropoda
- Subclass: Caenogastropoda
- Order: Neogastropoda
- Superfamily: Conoidea
- Family: Mitromorphidae
- Genus: Cymakra
- Species: C. granata

Binomial name
- Cymakra granata McLean & Poorman, 1971

Synonyms
- Mitromorpha (Mitrolumna) granata (McLean & Poorman, 1971)

Species of gastropod

Cymakra granata is a species of sea snail, a marine gastropod mollusk in the family Mitromorphidae.

== Description ==
The length of the shell attains 10 mm (0.39 in).

== Distribution ==
This marine species occurs in the Sea of Cortez, Western Mexico, and off Panama.
