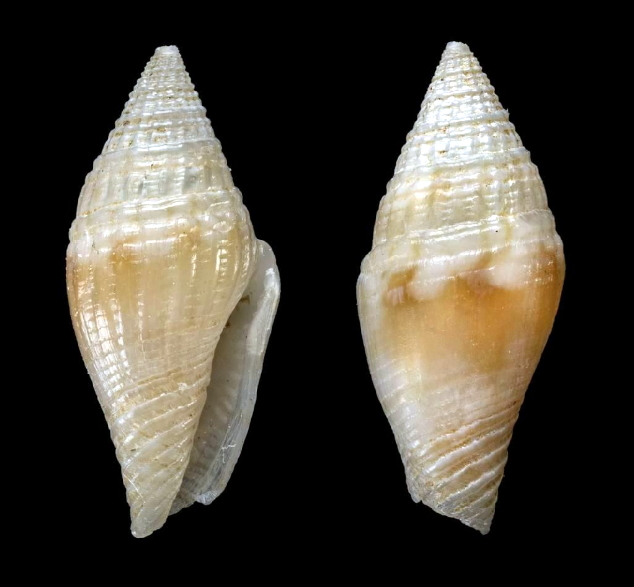
- Shell of Anarithma pamila (specimen in Natural History Museum, London)

Scientific classification
- Kingdom: Animalia
- Phylum: Mollusca
- Class: Gastropoda
- Subclass: Caenogastropoda
- Order: Neogastropoda
- Superfamily: Conoidea
- Family: Mitromorphidae
- Genus: Anarithma
- Species: A. pamila

Binomial name
- Anarithma pamila (Duclos, 1848)

Synonyms
- Colombella pamila Duclos, 1848 (original combination); Cythara garrettii Pease, 1860 junior subjective synonym (uncertain synonym); Mitromorpha flammulata Chino & Stahlschmidt, 2009 (uncertain synonym)

= Anarithma pamila =

Species of gastropod

Anarithma pamila is a species of sea snail, a marine gastropod mollusk in the family Mitromorphidae.

== Description ==
The length of the shell varies between 3.5 mm and 7 mm.

(Described as Cythara garrettii) The shell is fusiform (spindle-shaped), meaning it is attenuated or tapered at both the anterior and posterior ends. The longitudinal sculpture consists of distinct ribs, which are prominent on the upper whorls but become nearly or entirely obsolete on the body whorl. The entire surface is covered by fine, closely set, transverse striae (delicate spiral lines). A key feature is the presence of a single, deeply impressed line that encircles each of the whorls immediately below the sutures. In terms of coloration, the shell has a white ground color, which is marked irregularly with patches of reddish-brown. This reddish-brown color is extensive, covering the major part of the body whorl.

== Distribution ==
This marine species occurs off Papua New Guinea and New Caledonia
