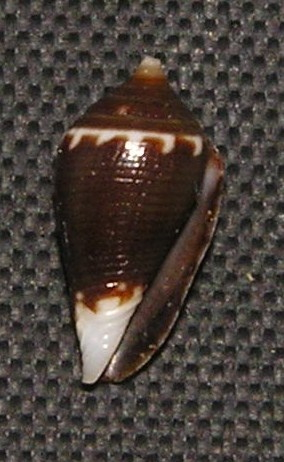
- Shell of Lovellona atramentosa

Scientific classification
- Kingdom: Animalia
- Phylum: Mollusca
- Class: Gastropoda
- Subclass: Caenogastropoda
- Order: Neogastropoda
- Superfamily: Conoidea
- Family: Mitromorphidae
- Genus: Lovellona
- Species: L. atramentosa

Binomial name
- Lovellona atramentosa (Reeve, 1849)

Synonyms
- Conus atramentosus Reeve, 1849 (basionym); Mitromorpha atramentosa Reeve

= Lovellona atramentosa =

Species of gastropod

Lovellona atramentosa is a species of sea snail, a marine gastropod mollusk in the family Mitromorphidae.

== Description ==
The shell size varies between 5 mm and 13 mm

The shell is encircled by finely pricked grooves. It has a chestnut-color with generally a few white spots on the shoulder, and is white-tinted at the base.

== Distribution ==
This species occurs in the Indian Ocean off the Aldabra Atoll, Mozambique and KwaZuluNatal, in the Indo-West Pacific.
