= Cymakra poncei =

Scientific classification
- Kingdom: Animalia
- Phylum: Mollusca
- Class: Gastropoda
- Subclass: Caenogastropoda
- Order: Neogastropoda
- Superfamily: Conoidea
- Family: Mitromorphidae
- Genus: Cymakra
- Species: C. poncei

Binomial name
- Cymakra poncei J. Gardner, 1937

Extinct species of gastropod

Cymakra poncei is an extinct species of sea snail, a marine gastropod mollusk in the family Mitromorphidae.

== Description ==
The length of the shell attains 6.5 mm, its diameter 2.4 mm.

== Distribution ==
This extinct marine species was found in Lower Miocene strata of the Chipola Formation in Florida, USA.
