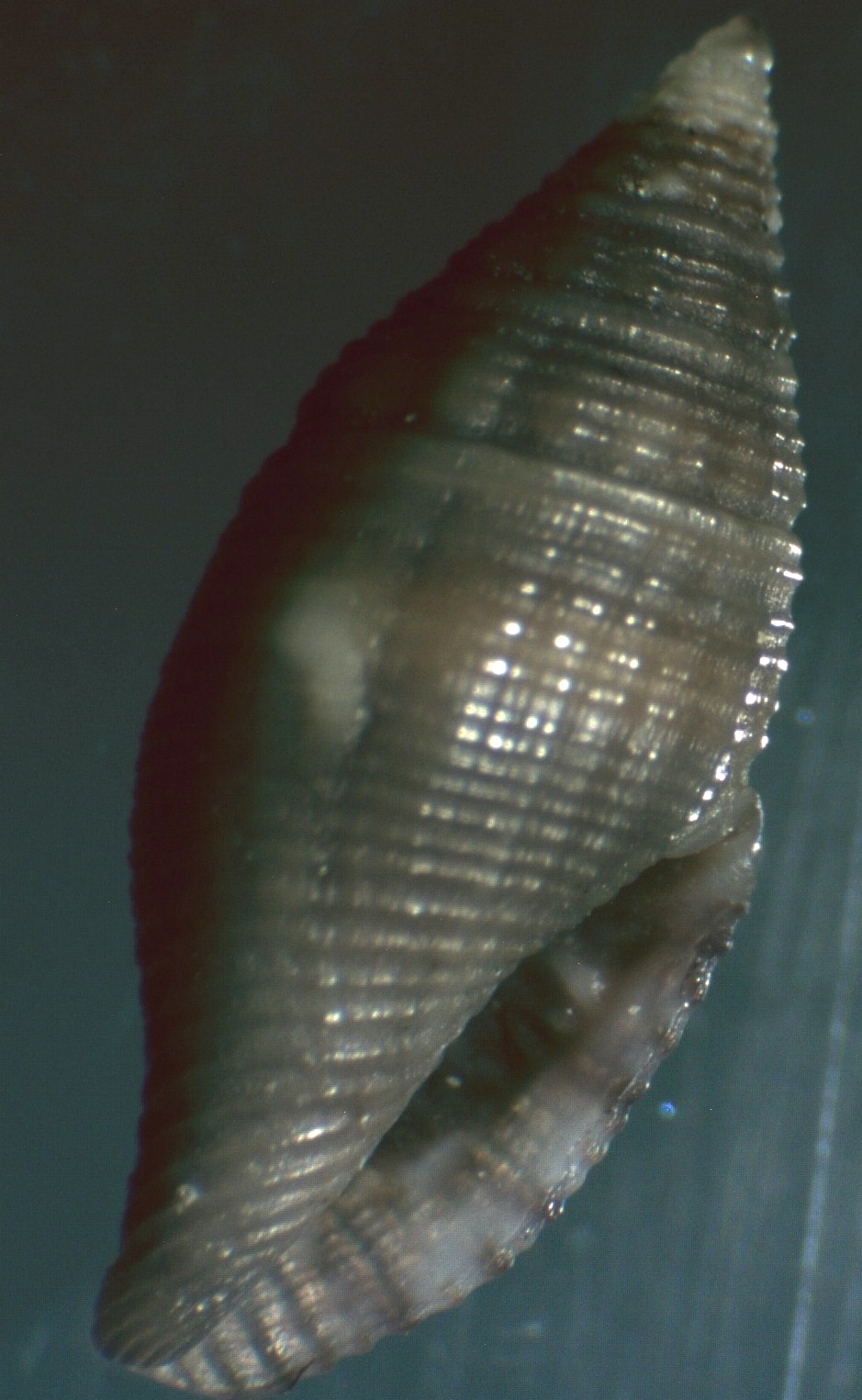
- Lovellona peaseana Finlay, 1927; family Mitromorphidae; Philippines

Scientific classification
- Kingdom: Animalia
- Phylum: Mollusca
- Class: Gastropoda
- Subclass: Caenogastropoda
- Order: Neogastropoda
- Superfamily: Conoidea
- Family: Mitromorphidae
- Genus: Lovellona; Iredale, 1917

Type species
- Conus atramentosus Reeve, 1849

Species
- See text

Synonyms
- Mitromorpha (Lovellona) Iredale, 1917

= Lovellona =

Genus of gastropods

Lovellona is a genus of sea snails, marine gastropod mollusks in the family Mitromorphidae.

== Description ==
Lovellona reproduce sexually. "Dead Lovellona form shallow marine sediments".

== Species ==
According to the World Register of Marine Species (WoRMS), the following species with a valid name are included within the genus Lovellona:

- Lovellona atramentosa (Reeve, 1849)
- Lovellona biconus Chino & Stahlschmidt, 2009
- Lovellona carbonaria Chino & Stahlschmidt, 2009
- Lovellona elongata Chino & Stahlschmidt, 2009
- Lovellona grandis Chino & Stahlschmidt, 2009
- Lovellona peaseana Finlay, 1927
