= Arielia =

Scientific classification
- Kingdom: Animalia
- Phylum: Mollusca
- Class: Gastropoda
- Subclass: Caenogastropoda
- Order: Neogastropoda
- Superfamily: Conoidea
- Family: Mitromorphidae
- Genus: Arielia; Shasky, 1961

Type species
- Arielia mitriformis Shasky, 1961

Species
- See text

Synonyms
- Arielia (Arielia) Shasky, 1961· accepted, alternate representation; Arielia (Vexiariella) Shuto, 1983· accepted, alternate representation; Ariella Shasky, 1961 (incorrect subsequent spelling by Shuto 1983); Vexiariella Shuto, 1983

Genus of gastropods

Arielia is a small genus of sea snails, marine gastropod mollusks in the family Mitromorphidae, in the superfamily Conoidea the cone snails and their allies.

== Species ==
- Arielia cancellata Shuto, 1983
- Arielia mitriformis Shasky, 1961
