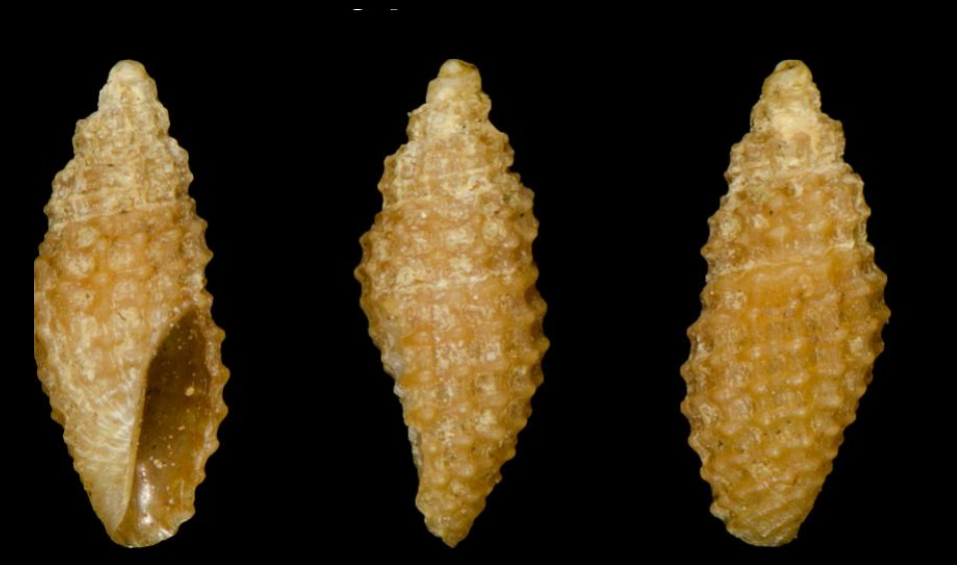
- Shell of Mitromorpha aspera (holotype at the Smithsonian Institution)

Scientific classification
- Kingdom: Animalia
- Phylum: Mollusca
- Class: Gastropoda
- Subclass: Caenogastropoda
- Order: Neogastropoda
- Superfamily: Conoidea
- Family: Mitromorphidae
- Genus: Mitromorpha
- Species: M. aspera

Binomial name
- Mitromorpha aspera (Carpenter, 1864)

Synonyms
- Daphnella aspera Carpenter, 1864

= Mitromorpha aspera =

Species of gastropod

Mitromorpha aspera is a species of sea snail, a marine gastropod mollusk in the family Mitromorphidae.

== Description ==
The reddish brown shell is spirally lirate and longitudinally closely costulate, the intersections forming a roughly aspirated surface.

== Distribution ==
This marine species occurs in the Pacific Ocean off California, USA.
