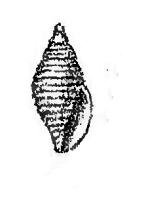
- Original image of a shell of Mitromorpha volva

Scientific classification
- Kingdom: Animalia
- Phylum: Mollusca
- Class: Gastropoda
- Subclass: Caenogastropoda
- Order: Neogastropoda
- Family: Mitromorphidae
- Genus: Mitromorpha
- Species: M. volva

Binomial name
- Mitromorpha volva Sowerby III, 1892

Synonyms
- Mitromorpha (Mitrolumna) volva Sowerby, G.B. III, 1892

= Mitromorpha volva =

Species of gastropod

Mitromorpha volva is a species of sea snail, a marine gastropod mollusk in the family Mitromorphidae.

== Description ==
The length of the shell attains 6 mm, its diameter 2¼ mm.

(Original description) The white shell has an elongate-fusiform shape. It contains 5½ slightly convex whorls. The slightly pronounced ribs are crossed by dense, spiral lirae. The ribs on the body whorl are only little elevated. The aperture is oblong. The columella is a little contorted.

== Distribution ==
This marine species occurs off Port Elizabeth, East Cape, South Africa.
