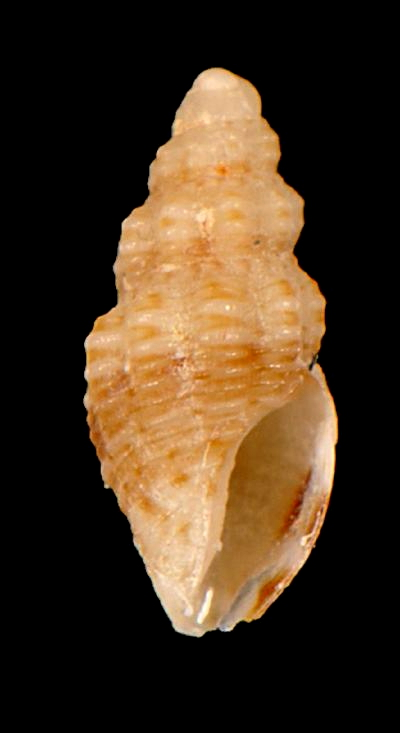
- Cymakra sp. (museum specimen in MNHN, Paris)

Scientific classification
- Kingdom: Animalia
- Phylum: Mollusca
- Class: Gastropoda
- Subclass: Caenogastropoda
- Order: Neogastropoda
- Superfamily: Conoidea
- Family: Mitromorphidae
- Genus: Cymakra; Gardner, 1937

Type species
- † Cymakra poncei J. Gardner, 1937

Species
- See text

= Cymakra =

Genus of gastropods

Cymakra is a genus of sea snails, marine gastropod mollusks in the family Mitromorphidae.

These are epifaunal carnivores occurring in the Gulf of Mexico.

== Species ==
According to the World Register of Marine Species (WoRMS), the following species with a valid name are included within the genus Cymakra :

- Cymakra baileyi McLean & Poorman, 1971
- Cymakra dubia (Olsson & McGinty, 1958)
- Cymakra granata McLean & Poorman, 1971
- † Cymakra poncei J. Gardner, 1937

Synonymized species

- Cymakra torticula (Dall, 1889): synonym of Mitromorpha torticula (Dall, 1889)
