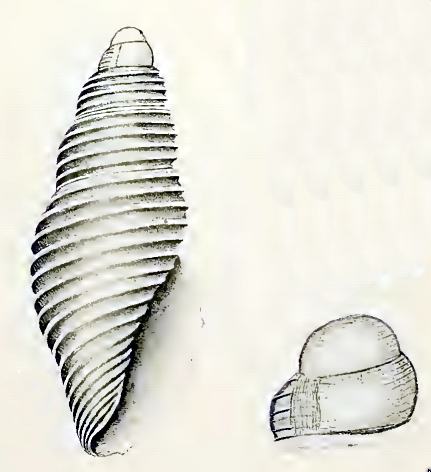
- Original image of a shell of Mitromorpha paucilirata

Scientific classification
- Kingdom: Animalia
- Phylum: Mollusca
- Class: Gastropoda
- Subclass: Caenogastropoda
- Order: Neogastropoda
- Superfamily: Conoidea
- Family: Mitromorphidae
- Genus: Mitromorpha
- Species: M. paucilirata

Binomial name
- Mitromorpha paucilirata Verco, 1909

Synonyms
- Mitromorpha (Mitrolumna) paucilirata (Verco, J.C., 1909); Mitromorpha paucilirata var. crassilirata Verco, J.C. 1909

= Mitromorpha paucilirata =

Species of gastropod

Mitromorpha paucilirata is a species of sea snail, a marine gastropod mollusk in the family Mitromorphidae.

== Description ==
The length of the shell attains 4 mm, its diameter 1.7 mm.

(Original description) The elongate-oval shell consists of 5 whorls, including a blunt protoconch of 2 convex whorls,. These whorls in the protoconch are apparently smooth, but microscopically minutely punctate from crowded spiral and axial lirae; the latter become more conspicuous just before the abrupt termination of the protoconch. The suture is simple and impressed. The whorls of the spire are convex, suture distinct, bounded below by a round spiral. The body whorl is oval, tapering anteriorly. The base of the shell is very faintly excavate. The aperture is oblique and narrowly oval . The outer lip is thin, simple, corrugated by the spirals, convex in profile, with a shallow, round sinus near the suture. The inner lip has a glaze, thicker on the columella, which is straight and forms a round, open angle with the slightly concave base of the whorl. There are four spirals in the first whorl, five in the second, and seventeen in the body whorl, becoming crowded towards the aperture, about one-third the width of the concave interspaces, which are well roughened (and the spirals slightly so) by crowded fine distinct oblique axial lirae. The spirals are opaque white in colour, and are faintly articulated with tiny brown suhdistant spots; the labrum is brownstained outside. In some examples there is a row of brown blotches in each whorl, running round the body whorl to a little above the middle of the outer lip.

== Distribution ==
This marine species is endemic to Australia and occurs off South Australia.
