= Mitromorpha drivasi =

Scientific classification
- Kingdom: Animalia
- Phylum: Mollusca
- Class: Gastropoda
- Subclass: Caenogastropoda
- Order: Neogastropoda
- Superfamily: Conoidea
- Family: Mitromorphidae
- Genus: Mitromorpha
- Species: M. drivasi

Binomial name
- Mitromorpha drivasi (Z.-G. Chang, 1995)

Synonyms
- Anarithma drivasi C.-K. Chang, 1995 superseded combination

Species of gastropod

Mitromorpha drivasi is a species of sea snail, a marine gastropod mollusk in the family Mitromorphidae.

== Description ==
The length of the shell attains 5 mm.

== Distribution ==
This marine species occurs off Taiwan
