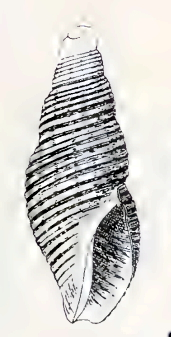
- Shell of Maorimorpha suteri

Scientific classification
- Kingdom: Animalia
- Phylum: Mollusca
- Class: Gastropoda
- Subclass: Caenogastropoda
- Order: Neogastropoda
- Superfamily: Conoidea
- Family: Mitromorphidae
- Genus: Maorimorpha; Powell, 1939

Type species
- Mitromorpha suteri Murdoch, 1905

Species
- See text

= Maorimorpha =

Genus of gastropods

Maorimorpha is a small genus of sea snails, marine gastropod mollusks in the family Mitromorphidae, in the superfamily Conoidea the cone snails and their allies.

== Species ==
- Maorimorpha secunda Powell, 1942
- Maorimorpha sulcata (Sowerby III, 1892)
- Maorimorpha suteri (Murdoch, 1905)
