= Mitromorpha benthicola =

Scientific classification
- Kingdom: Animalia
- Phylum: Mollusca
- Class: Gastropoda
- Subclass: Caenogastropoda
- Order: Neogastropoda
- Superfamily: Conoidea
- Family: Mitromorphidae
- Genus: Mitromorpha
- Species: M. benthicola

Binomial name
- Mitromorpha benthicola (Dell, 1962)

Synonyms
- Itia benthicola Dell, 1962 (original combination); Mitrithara benthicola (Dell, 1962); Mitromorpha (Mitrolumna) benthicola Dell, R.K., 1962

Species of gastropod

Mitromorpha benthicola is a species of sea snail, a marine gastropod mollusk in the family Mitromorphidae.

== Description ==
The length of the shell attains 6 mm (0.24 in), its diameter is 2 mm (0.079 in).

== Distribution ==
This marine species occurs off the Ninety Mile Beach, North Island, New Zealand.
