= Mitrellatoma =

Scientific classification
- Kingdom: Animalia
- Phylum: Mollusca
- Class: Gastropoda
- Subclass: Caenogastropoda
- Order: Neogastropoda
- Superfamily: Conoidea
- Family: Mitromorphidae
- Genus: †Mitrellatoma; Powell, 1942

Type species
- † Columbella angustata Hutton, 1885

Species
- See text

Extinct genus of gastropods

Mitrellatoma is an extinct genus of sea snails, marine gastropod mollusks in the family Mitromorphidae.

== Species ==
According to the World Register of Marine Species (WoRMS), the following species with a valid name are included within the genus Mitrellatoma :

- † Mitrellatoma angustata (Hutton, 1885)

Synonymized species

- Mitrellatoma mitra Kilburn, 1986: synonym of Otitoma cyclophora (Deshayes, 1863)
