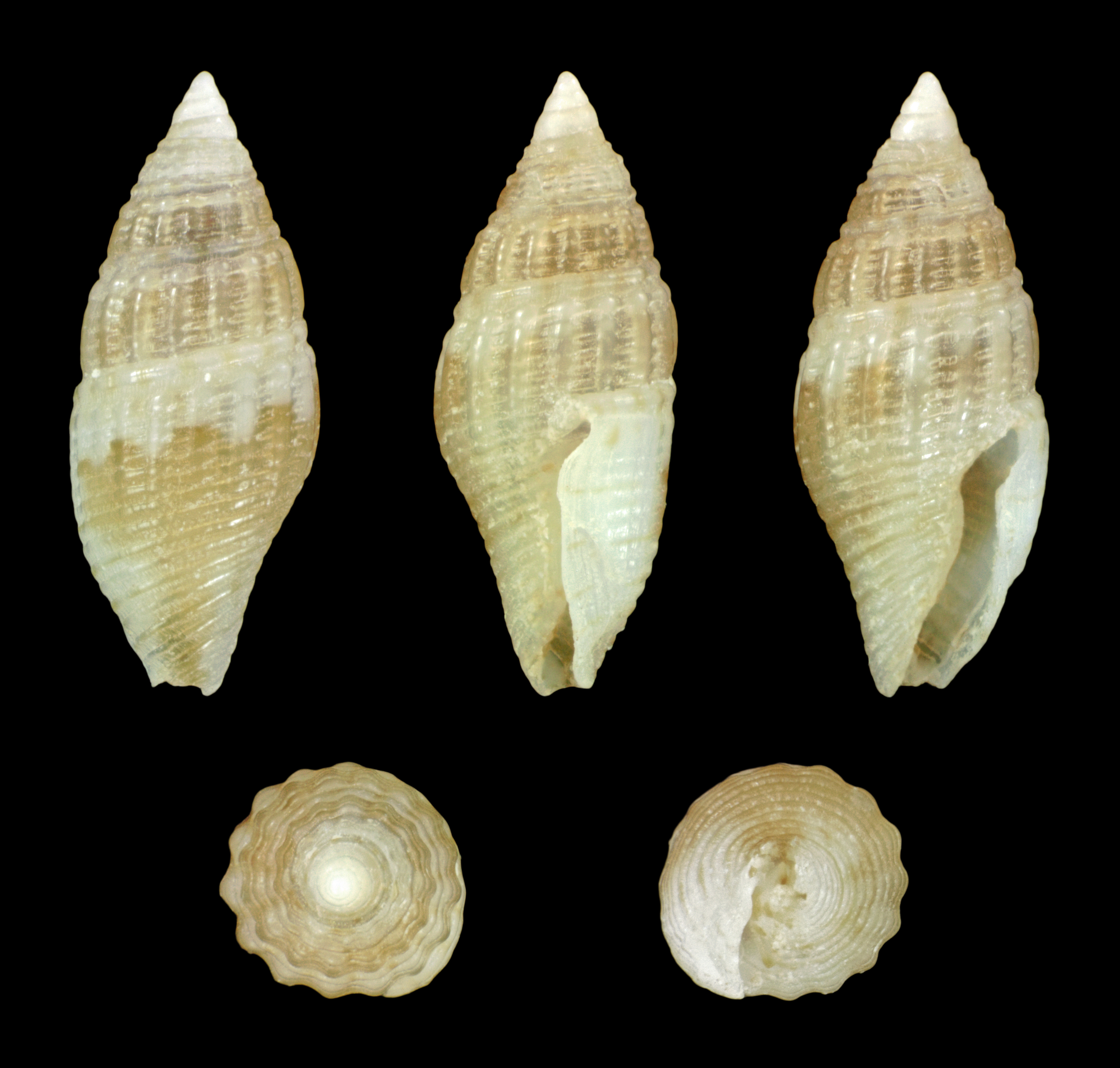
- Shell of Anarithma metula

Scientific classification
- Kingdom: Animalia
- Phylum: Mollusca
- Class: Gastropoda
- Subclass: Caenogastropoda
- Order: Neogastropoda
- Superfamily: Conoidea
- Family: Mitromorphidae
- Genus: Anarithma
- Species: A. metula

Binomial name
- Anarithma metula (Hinds, 1843)

Synonyms
- Anarithma dibolos K.H. Barnard, 1964; Anarithma garrettii W.H. Pease, 1860; Anarithma pusiola R.W. Dunker, 1871; Clavatula metula Hinds, 1843; Columbella (Seminella) pacei Melvill & Standen, 1896 (junior homonym of Columbella pacei E.A. Smith, 1895; Columbella (Seminella) stepheni is a replacement name; Columbella dibolos Barnard, 1964 junior subjective synonym; Colombella pamila Duclos, 1848; Columbella sublachryma R.P.J. Hervier, 1900; Mangilia metula (Hinds, 1843); Mitra lachryma Reeve, 1845; Mitromorpha metula (Hinds, 1843)

= Anarithma metula =

Species of gastropod

Anarithma metula is a species of sea snail, a marine gastropod mollusk in the family Mitromorphidae.

== Description ==
The length of the shell varies between 3.5 mm and 7 mm.

The five whorls are flattened. They are obsoletely ribbed and transversely striated. The suture shows a raised line. The outer lip is inflected in the middle. The color of the shell is yellowish brown, banded with chestnut.

(Original description as Anarithma stepheni) The minute, white shell is particularly beautiful. It contains six whorls, compact, clathrate, with close longitudinal riblets and revolving lirae. Just underneath the sutures the ante-penultimate and penultimate whorls are sparsely spotted with fulvous. In the body whorl the spots again occur towards the middle, but are contiguous to, and below joined with, one large dorsal effusion of the same colour. The aperture is narrow. The simple outer lip is thickened..The columella is upright.

== Distribution ==
This marine species occurs from Eastern Transkei, South Africa, Mozambique and Madagascar to the Philippines, Fiji, French Polynesia, Vanuatu, Papua New Guinea and Hawaii
