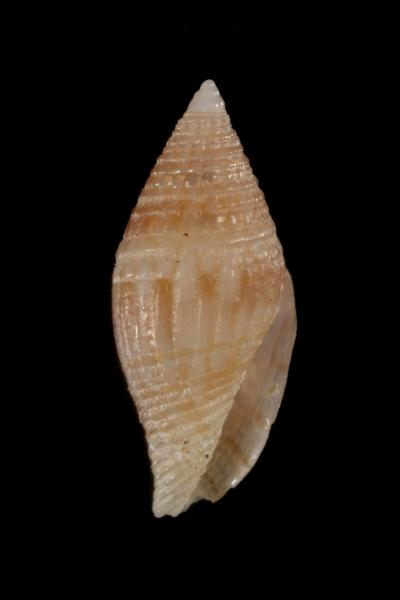
- Shell of Anarithma sublachryma

Scientific classification
- Kingdom: Animalia
- Phylum: Mollusca
- Class: Gastropoda
- Subclass: Caenogastropoda
- Order: Neogastropoda
- Superfamily: Conoidea
- Family: Mitromorphidae; T. L. Casey, 1904

Genera
- See text

Synonyms
- Diptychomitrinae L. Bellardi, 1888; Mitrolumnidae Sacco, 1904; Mitromorphinae Casey, 1904 (new rank)

= Mitromorphidae =

Family of gastropods

Mitromorphidae is a monophyletic family of small to medium-sized sea snails, marine gastropod mollusks in the superfamily Conoidea.

Bouchet, Kantor et al. elevated in 2011 the subfamily Mitromorphinae (which at that point had been placed in the family Conidae) to the rank of family. This was based on a cladistic analysis of shell morphology, radular characteristics, anatomical characters, and a dataset of molecular sequences of three gene fragments.

== Description ==
The Mitromorphidae have small to medium-sized shells with a high biconic mitriform shape, a paucispiral or multispiral protoconch up to 4.5 whorls, a short or indistinct siphonal canal, narrow aperture with up to 3 columellar pleats, indistinct anal sinus on a weakly pronounced subsutural ramp, fairly smooth surface with spiral sculptural elements. There is no operculum, and the radula is relatively short, hypodermic in character with awl-shaped teeth, a swollen solid basal region, and may have a weak barb at the terminal end of the radular tooth.

== Genera ==
This is a list of the accepted names of genera in the family Mitromorphidae (the main reference for recent species is the World Register of Marine Species).

- Anarithma Iredale, 1916
- Arielia Shasky, 1961
- Cymakra Gardner, 1937
- † Itia Marwick, 1931
- Lovellona Iredale, 1917
- Maorimorpha Powell, 1939
- † Mitrellatoma Powell, 1942
- Mitromorpha Carpenter, 1865
- Scrinium Hedley, 1922

Genera brought into synonymy

- Ariella Shasky, 1961: synonym of Arielia Shasky, 1961
- Citharopsis Pease, 1868: synonym of Anarithma Iredale, 1916
- † Clinomitra Bellardi, 1889 : synonym of Mitromorpha Carpenter, 1865
- † Diptychomitra Bellardi, 1889 : synonym of Mitromorpha Carpenter, 1865
- Helenella Casey, 1904: synonym of Mitromorpha Carpenter, 1865
- Mitramorpha : synonym of Mitromorpha Carpenter, 1865 (variant spelling)
- Mitrithara Hedley, 1922: synonym of Mitromorpha Carpenter, 1865
- Mitrolumna Bucquoy, Dautzenberg & Dollfus, 1883: synonym of Mitromorpha Carpenter, 1865
- Vexiariella Shuto, 1983: synonym of Arielia Shasky, 1961
