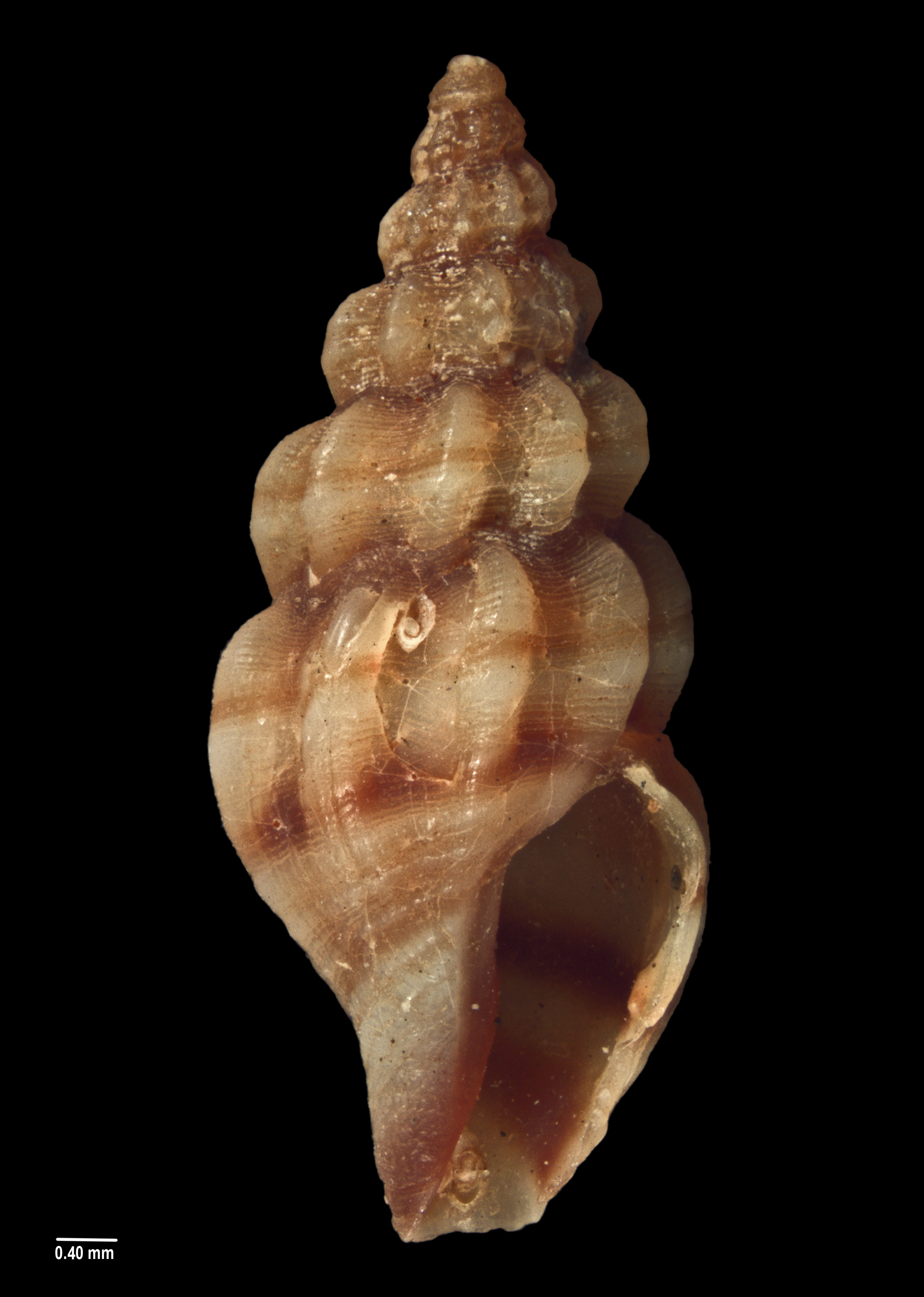

Scientific classification
- Kingdom: Animalia
- Phylum: Mollusca
- Class: Gastropoda
- Subclass: Caenogastropoda
- Order: Neogastropoda
- Superfamily: Conoidea
- Family: Mangeliidae
- Genus: Neoguraleus
- Species: N. sinclairi

Binomial name
- Neoguraleus sinclairi (Gillies, 1882)

Synonyms
- Defrancia luteofasciata Hutton, 1881; Drillia sinclairi Gillies, 1882 (original combination); Neoguraleus sinclairi (E. A. Smith, 1884) (synonym and homonym); Neoguraleus whangaroaensis Powell, A.W.B., 1942; Pleurotoma (Mangilia) sinclairii E. A. Smith, 1884; Pleurotoma sinclairii E. A. Smith, 1884 (synonym and homonym)

= Neoguraleus sinclairi =

Species of gastropod

Neoguraleus sinclairi is a species of sea snail, a marine gastropod mollusk in the family Mangeliidae.

Not to be confused with Neoguraleus sinclairi (E.A.Smith, 1884) (synonym of Neoguraleus finlayi Powell, 1942).

== Authority ==
Tucker (2004) states that Drillia sinclairi Gillies, 1882is a nude name, but it is not; Gillies (1882) renamed a misidentification by Hutton (1880), referring to p. 45 where Hutton gave a description of "Defranchia luteo-fasciata". This description is not copied from Reeve's description of "Pleurotoma luteo-fasciata".

== Description ==
The length of the shell attains 11 mm, its diameter 4.5 mm.

(Original description in Latin of Pleurotoma (Mangilia) sinclairii) The ovate shell is somewhat turreted. It is pale yellowish, and is adorned with two red bands at the sutures between the ribs; it has 8 convex whorls, which are slightly flattened superiorly, and are adorned with 16 thin ribs (which are nearly continuous on the base of the body whorl), and is transversely rather thickly spirally ridged, with unequal ridges continuous above and between the ribs; the aperture is small, banded with brown internally and its length is equal to 5/11 of the total length; the outer lip is thin, slightly sinuous a little below the suture; the tail is brown; the columella is covered with a very thin callus; the siphonal canal is very short and oblique.

== Distribution ==
This marine species is endemic to New Zealand and occurs throughout New Zealand and at the Steward Island and the Chatham Islands; fossils have been found in Pliocene strata.
