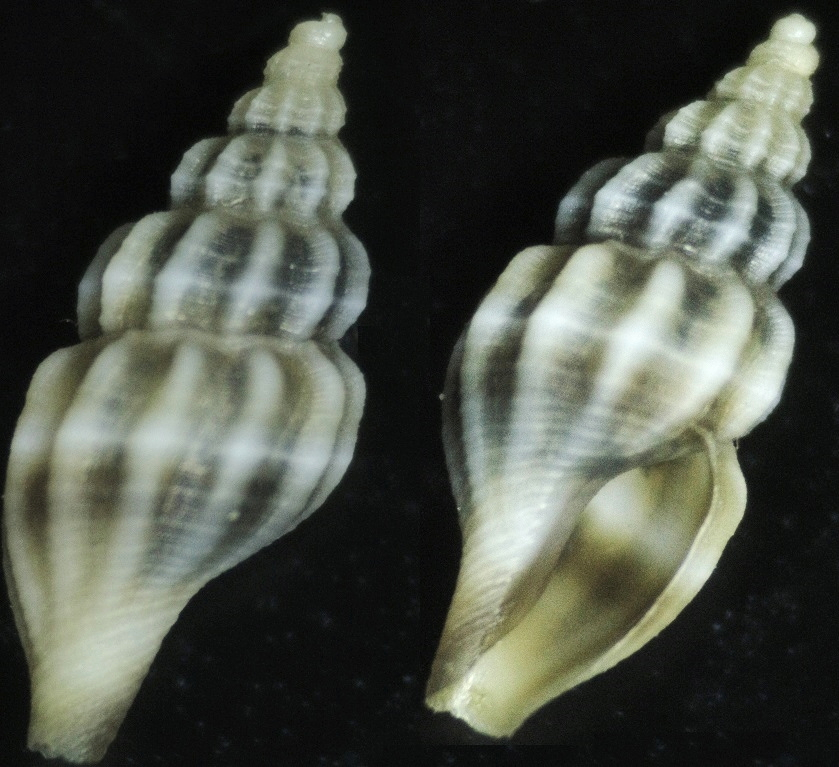
- Two shells of Neoguraleus murdochi

Scientific classification
- Kingdom: Animalia
- Phylum: Mollusca
- Class: Gastropoda
- Subclass: Caenogastropoda
- Order: Neogastropoda
- Superfamily: Conoidea
- Family: Mangeliidae
- Genus: Neoguraleus
- Species: N. murdochi

Binomial name
- Neoguraleus murdochi (Finlay, 1924)

Synonyms
- † Clathurella corrugata R. Murdoch, 1900

= Neoguraleus murdochi =

Species of gastropod

Neoguraleus murdochi is a species of sea snail, a marine gastropod mollusk in the family Mangeliidae.

== Description ==
The length of the shell attains 9 mm, its diameter 3.5 mm.

== Distribution ==
This marine species is endemic to New Zealand and occurs throughout New Zealand and at the Steward Island; fossils have been found in Pliocene strata.
