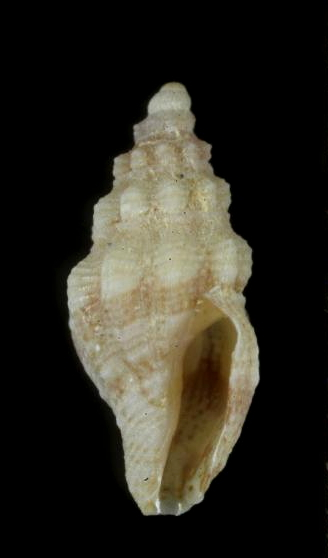
- Shells of Macteola interrupta (museum specimen at MNHN, Paris)

Scientific classification
- Kingdom: Animalia
- Phylum: Mollusca
- Class: Gastropoda
- Subclass: Caenogastropoda
- Order: Neogastropoda
- Superfamily: Conoidea
- Family: Mangeliidae
- Genus: Macteola; Hedley, 1918

Type species
- Purpura (Cronia) anomala Angas, 1877

Species
- See text

= Macteola =

Genus of gastropods

Macteola is a genus of sea snails, marine gastropod mollusks in the family Mangeliidae.

== Description ==
This name is proposed for a genus of the Mangiliinae, in which the aperture has not acquired armature, and in which the lip is not flexed. Prominent radial ribs are over-ridden by fine beaded spiral threads. The apex is mucronate (i.e. with a small pointed projection, or spine-like ending), with smooth whorls. Characteristic is a colour scheme of a peripheral zone of brown or black or orange, sometimes broken into a series of dots or clashes.

== Species ==
Species within the genus Macteola include:

- Macteola anomala (Angas, 1877)
- Macteola biconica Stahlschmidt, Poppe & Tagaro, 2015
- Macteola chinoi Stahlschmidt, Fraussen & Kilburn, 2012
- Macteola interrupta (Reeve, 1846)
- Macteola miresculpta (Bozzetti, 2020)
- Macteola theskela (Melvill & Standen, 1895)

Species brought into synonymy

- Macteola bella W.H. Pease, 1860: synonym of Macteola interrupta (L.A. Reeve, 1846)
- Macteola cinctura C. Hedley, 1922: synonym of Macteola segesta cinctura C. Hedley, 1922
- Macteola gemmulata G.P. Deshayes, 1863: synonym of Macteola interrupta (L.A. Reeve, 1846)
- Macteola sandersonae (Bucknill, 1927): synonym of Neoguraleus sandersonae (Bucknill, 1927)
- Macteola segesta (Duclos, 1850): synonym of Macteola interrupta (Reeve, 1846)
