= Kap Brewster Formation =

Geologic formation in Greenland

- Stratigraphic range: Neogene
- Type: Formation

Location
- Country: Greenland

Type section
- Named for: Cape Brewster

The Kap Brewster Formation is a geologic formation in Greenland. It preserves fossils dating back to the Neogene period.

== See also ==
- List of fossiliferous stratigraphic units in Greenland
