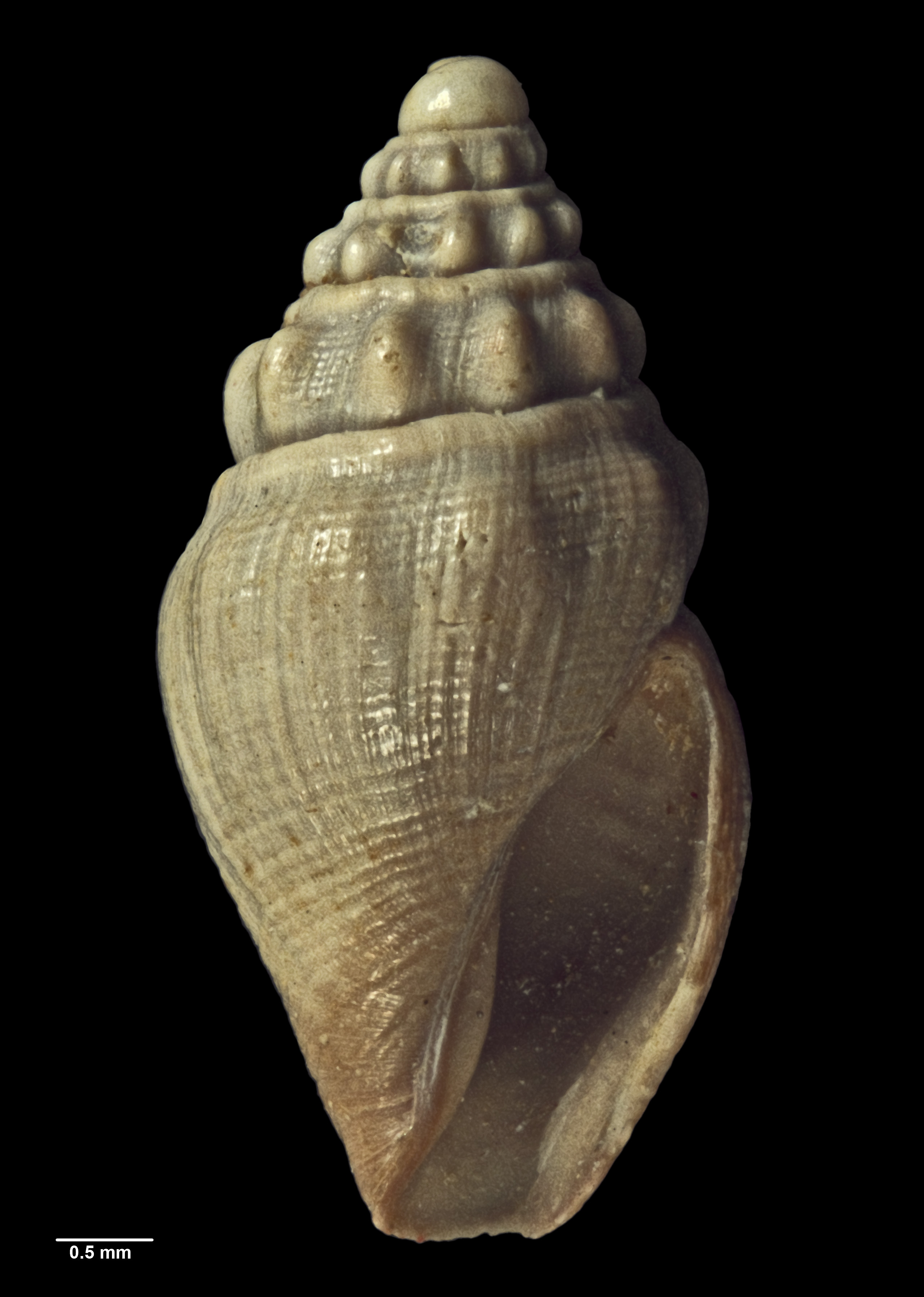
- Holotype from Auckland War Memorial Museum

Scientific classification
- Kingdom: Animalia
- Phylum: Mollusca
- Class: Gastropoda
- Subclass: Caenogastropoda
- Order: Neogastropoda
- Family: Mitromorphidae
- Genus: Scrinium
- Species: †S. nanum

Binomial name
- †Scrinium nanum A. W. B. Powell, 1944

= Scrinium nanum =

Scrinium nanum Temporal range: early Miocene

Extinct species of gastropod

Scrinium nanum is an extinct species of sea snail, a marine gastropod mollusc in the family Mitromorphidae. Fossils of the species date to the early Miocene, and occur in the strata of the Port Phillip Basin of Victoria, Australia.

== Description ==
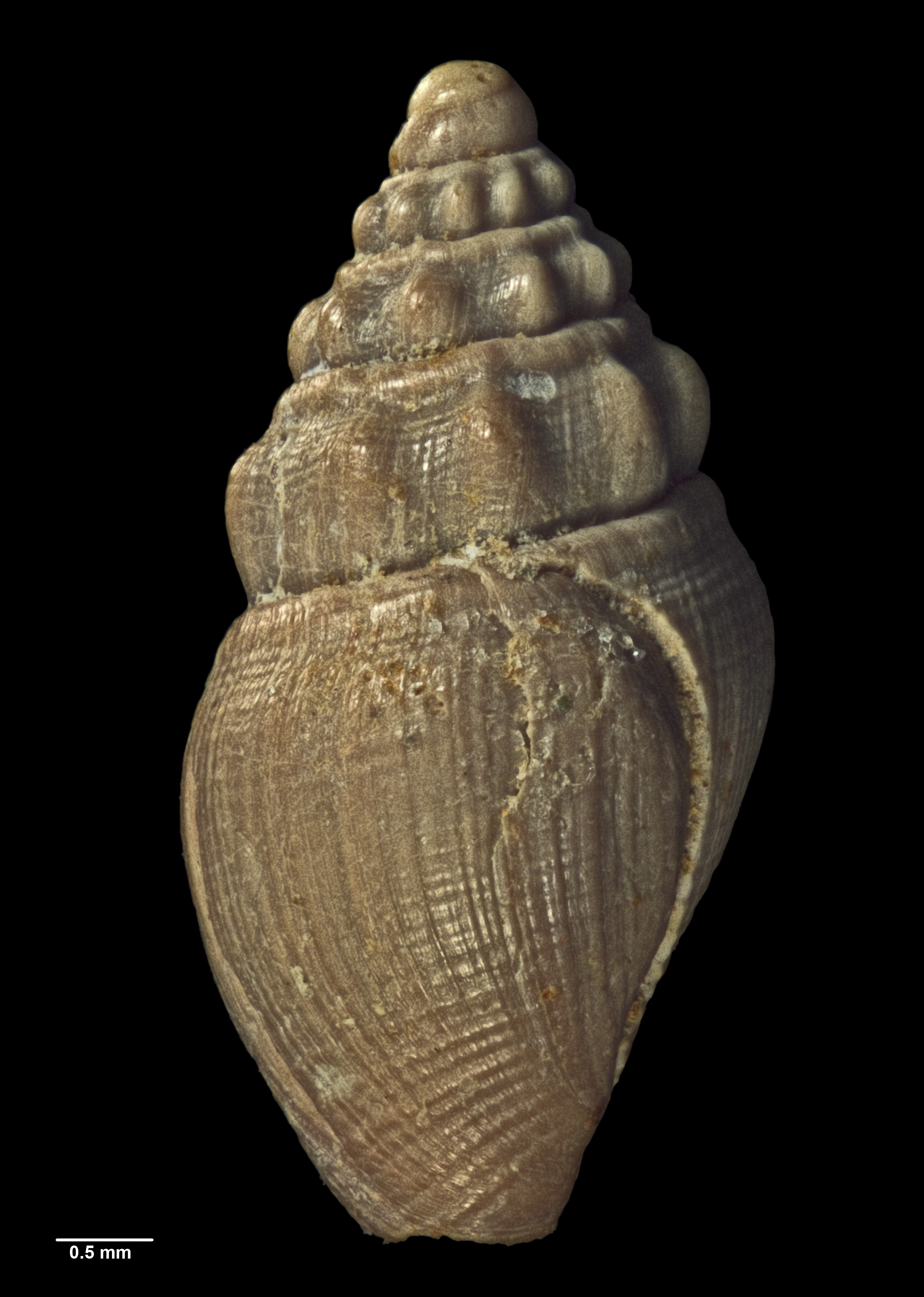
Reverse view of holotype

In the original description, Powell described the species as follows:

Similar to duplicatum, but smaller; spiral sculpture weaker, subsutural fold much heavier, not duplicated, and axials obsolete or subobsolete on last half-whorl. Whorls 5½, including smooth, dome-shaped protoconch of 14 whorls. There is a deep, narrow excavation below the subsutural fold. Axials strong, broadly rounded, neither crossing shoulder excavation nor extending to the base, 10-12 on penultimate. Spiral sculpture of closely spaced fine threads, about 16 on penultimate and about 36 on body- whorl and base, those on the base being the stronger.

The holotype of the species measures 6.1 mm (0.24 in) in height and 3 mm (0.12 in) in diameter.

== Taxonomy ==
The species was first described by A.W.B. Powell in 1944. The holotype was collected from Torquay, Victoria, at an unknown date prior to 1944, and is held by the Auckland War Memorial Museum.

== Distribution ==
This extinct marine species dates to the early Miocene, and occurs in the strata of the Port Phillip Basin of Victoria, Australia, known from the Puebla Formation.
