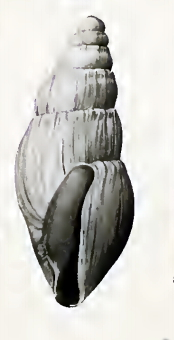
- Scrinium furtivum

Scientific classification
- Kingdom: Animalia
- Phylum: Mollusca
- Class: Gastropoda
- Subclass: Caenogastropoda
- Order: Neogastropoda
- Superfamily: Conoidea
- Family: Mitromorphidae
- Genus: Scrinium; Hedley, 1922

Type species
- Mitromorpha brazieri E. A. Smith, 1892

Species
- See text

= Scrinium =

Genus of molluscs

Scrinium is a genus of sea snails, marine gastropod mollusks belonging to the family Mitromorphidae, in the superfamily Conoidea the cone snails and their allies.

== Description ==
The small shell is oblong and rounded at each end. It contains only a few whorls. The low protoconch is dome-shaped. The colour is yellow and brown, uniform or variegated. There is no differentiation of the fasciole area. The sculpture consists of obscure radial ribs and faint spiral grooves. The aperture is rather wide and smooth inside. The sinus is shallow. The outer lip is simple. The siphonal canal is short and wide, with an everted margin. The columella is concave and twisted.

== Distribution ==
The species in this genus occur off Australia and New Zealand. Fossils have been found off New Zealand, ranging in age from: 37.2 to 15.9 Ma.

== Species ==
- † Scrinium blandiatum (Suter, 1917)
- Scrinium brazieri (E. A. Smith, 1892)
- † Scrinium callimorphum (Suter, 1917)
- † Scrinium duplicatum A. W. B. Powell, 1944
- † Scrinium finlayi Powell, 1942
- Scrinium furtivum Hedley, 1922
- Scrinium gatliffi (Verco, 1909)
- † Scrinium haroldi A. W. B. Powell, 1944
- † Scrinium hemiothone (Tenison Woods, 1879)
- Scrinium impendens (Verco, 1909)
- † Scrinium limbatum Maxwell, 1992
- † Scrinium nanum A. W. B. Powell, 1944
- Scrinium neozelanicum (Suter, 1908)
- † Scrinium ordinatum (Hutton, 1877)
- † Scrinium stirophorum Suter, 1917
- † Scrinium strongi Marwick, 1931
- † Scrinium thomsoni Powell, 1942

Species brought into synonymy

- Scrinium neozelanica [sic] : synonym of Scrinium neozelanicum (Suter, 1908)
- Scrinium sandersonae Bucknill, 1928: synonym of Neoguraleus sandersonae (Bucknill, 1928)
