= Neoguraleus lineatus =

Scientific classification
- Kingdom: Animalia
- Phylum: Mollusca
- Class: Gastropoda
- Subclass: Caenogastropoda
- Order: Neogastropoda
- Superfamily: Conoidea
- Family: Mangeliidae
- Genus: Neoguraleus
- Species: N. lineatus

Binomial name
- Neoguraleus lineatus (J. Marwick, 1928)

Synonyms
- † Guraleus lineatus J.Marwick, 1928 (original combination)

Extinct species of gastropod

Neoguraleus lineatus is an extinct species of sea snail, a marine gastropod mollusk in the family Mangeliidae.

== Description ==
The length of this very small shell attains 4.5 mm, its diameter is 2.5 mm.

== Distribution ==
This extinct marine species is endemic to New Zealand and occurs in Tertiary strata on Pitt Island.
