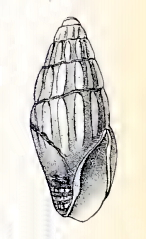
- Image of a shell of Neoguraleus lyallensis

Scientific classification
- Kingdom: Animalia
- Phylum: Mollusca
- Class: Gastropoda
- Subclass: Caenogastropoda
- Order: Neogastropoda
- Superfamily: Conoidea
- Family: Mangeliidae
- Genus: Neoguraleus
- Species: N. lyallensis

Binomial name
- Neoguraleus lyallensis (Murdoch, 1905)

Synonyms
- Drillia lyallensis Murdoch, 1905 (original combination); Neoguraleus lyallensis lyallensis (Murdoch, 1905); Neoguraleus lyallensis tenebrosus (Powell, 1926); Neoguraleus tenebrosus Powell, 1926

= Neoguraleus lyallensis =

Species of gastropod

Neoguraleus lyallensis is a species of sea snail, a marine gastropod mollusk in the family Mangeliidae.

== Description ==
The length of the shell attains 13 mm, its diameter 5.5 mm.

The small shell is fusiform and rather solid. The sculpture consists of 11 to 12 low, strong, rounded, and slightly oblique axial ribs, rather wider than the interspaces, obsolete on the base and usually on approaching the outer lip. The spiral sculpture consists of minute striae, erased upon the ribs, a few at the anterior end stronger, and frequently several rough irregular ridges on the basal fascicle. The colour of the shell is light or dark brownish-red, or somewhat purple in somewhat beach-worn specimens. The spire is conical, with a lightly turriculated appearance, somewhat higher than the aperture. The protoconch is smooth, with a depressed nucleus. The shell contains 6 to 6½ whorls, moderately convex and lightly contracted at the base. The suture is somewhat deep and undulating. The aperture is narrowly rhomboidal, subchannelled above and terminates in a short, broad, and slightly twisted siphonal canal, not emarginate below. The outer lip is slightly thickened, flatly convex, and a little contracted towards the base, with a shallow rounded sinus below the suture. The columella is lightly curved, narrowed to a fine point at the left margin of the siphonal canal, and excavated on meeting the convex parietal wall. The inner lip rather is narrow, smooth, andnot very thick. The operculum is unknown.

== Distribution ==
This marine species is endemic to New Zealand and occurs off North Island, South Island and Stewart Island.
