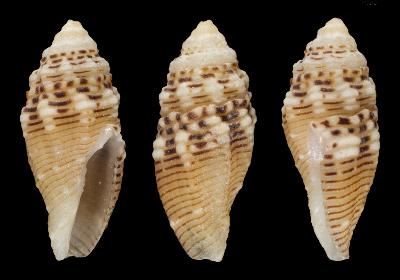
- Shells of Macteola chinoi (holotype in MNHN, Paris)

Scientific classification
- Kingdom: Animalia
- Phylum: Mollusca
- Class: Gastropoda
- Subclass: Caenogastropoda
- Order: Neogastropoda
- Superfamily: Conoidea
- Family: Mangeliidae
- Genus: Macteola
- Species: M. chinoi

Binomial name
- Macteola chinoi Stahlschmidt, Fraussen & Kilburn, 2012

= Macteola chinoi =

Species of gastropod

Macteola chinoi is a species of sea snail, a marine gastropod mollusc in the family Mangeliidae.

== Description ==
The length of the shell attains 7 mm.

== Distribution ==
This marine species occurs off Mactan Island, the Philippines.
