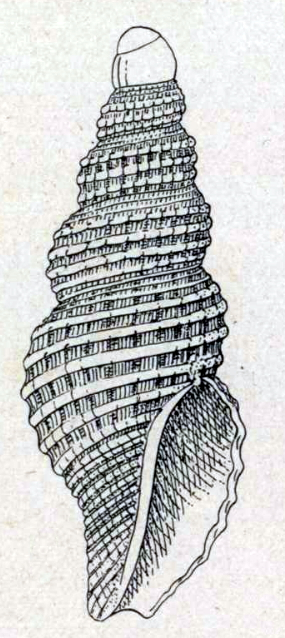
- Shell of Neoguraleus protensus

Scientific classification
- Kingdom: Animalia
- Phylum: Mollusca
- Class: Gastropoda
- Subclass: Caenogastropoda
- Order: Neogastropoda
- Superfamily: Conoidea
- Family: Mangeliidae
- Genus: Neoguraleus
- Species: N. protensus

Binomial name
- Neoguraleus protensus (Hutton, 1885)

Synonyms
- † Daphnella protensa Hutton, 1885

= Neoguraleus protensus =

Extinct species of gastropod

Neoguraleus protensus is an extinct species of sea snail, a marine gastropod mollusk in the family Mangeliidae.

== Description ==
Two specimens turned up, which differ from the type by the predominating spiral sculpture and very feeble axial plications. Typically there are delicate spiral threads, but in our specimens there are distinct chords present, which are crossed by flexuous longitudinal striæ. Only the upper whorls are distinctly decussate. The protoconch, consisting of two smooth whorls, is much larger than in fossil specimens from Petane, more bulbose, and with an oblique nucleus.

== Distribution ==
This extinct marine species is endemic to New Zealand from Pliocene strata of Petane.
