= Scrinium blandiatum =

Scientific classification
- Kingdom: Animalia
- Phylum: Mollusca
- Class: Gastropoda
- Subclass: Caenogastropoda
- Order: Neogastropoda
- Superfamily: Conoidea
- Family: Mitromorphidae
- Genus: Scrinium
- Species: S. blandiatum

Binomial name
- Scrinium blandiatum (Suter, 1917)

Synonyms
- † Mangilia blandiata Suter, 1917 (original combination)

Extinct species of gastropod

Scrinium blandiatum is an extinct species of sea snail, a marine gastropod mollusk in the family Mitromorphidae.

== Description ==
This species was originally described by Henry Suter in 1917 under the name Mangilia blandiata. The length of the shell varies between 7 mm and 8 mm. It has a strongly concave sutural ramp and broad axial costae. The spiral sculpture is faint and sometimes invisible, threads and grooves mostly visible on the base.

== Distribution ==
This extinct marine species is endemic to New Zealand. Fossils have been found in the Waitaki region, specifically in the Otekaike Limestone. These fossils date to the Early Miocene (Waitakian stage).
