= Cape Tobin =

Cape in Greenland

Cape Tobin Uunartoq
- Cape
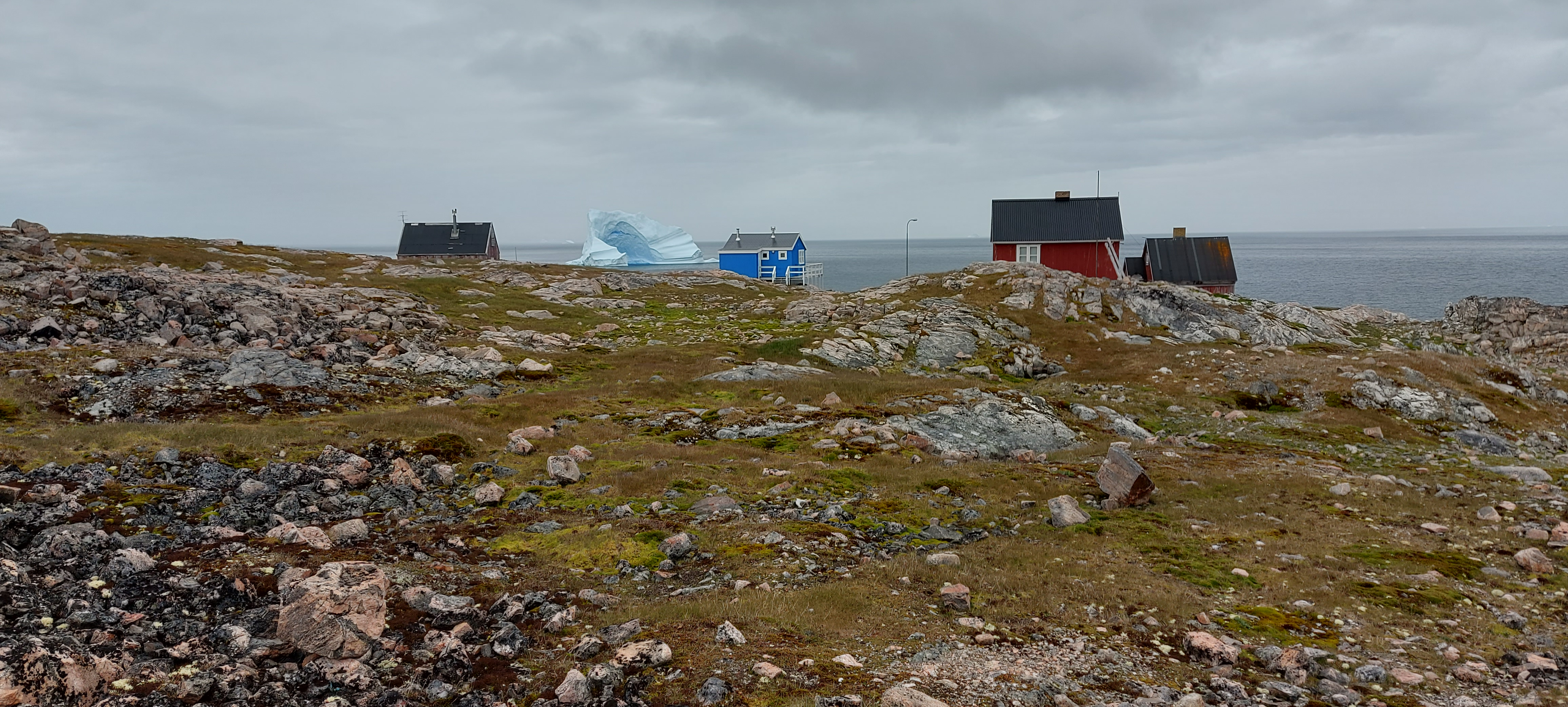
- Part of the village of Cape Tobin with an iceberg in the background

- Coordinates: 70°25′N 21°57′W
- Location: Sermersooq, Greenland
- Offshore water bodies: Greenland Sea

Area
  - Total: Arctic

Cape Tobin (Greenlandic: Uunartoq, "that which one burns oneself on") is a cape located in the northeast of Sermersooq, Greenland. It is located near the settlement of Ittoqqortoormiit, where short trips and long hauls provide access to the cape. Cape Tobin is located opposite Cape Brewster (Kangikajik). It is called Uunartoq because it is home to the hottest hot spring in Greenland, where the water temperature is 62 °C (144 °F).
