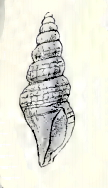
- Original image of Neoguraleus amoenus

Scientific classification
- Kingdom: Animalia
- Phylum: Mollusca
- Class: Gastropoda
- Subclass: Caenogastropoda
- Order: Neogastropoda
- Superfamily: Conoidea
- Family: Mangeliidae
- Genus: Neoguraleus
- Species: N. amoenus

Binomial name
- Neoguraleus amoenus (E. A. Smith, 1884)

Synonyms
- Mangilia protensa Hutton, 1885; Neoguraleus amoena [sic]; Pleurotoma (Drillia) amoena E. A. Smith, 1884 (original combination); Pleurotoma amoena (E. A. Smith, 1884)

= Neoguraleus amoenus =

Species of gastropod

Neoguraleus amoenus is a species of sea snail, a marine gastropod mollusc in the family Mangeliidae.

== Description ==
The length of the shell attains 14 mm, its diameter 5 mm.

In his "Manual of New Zealand Mollusca" (1913), Henry Suter had no doubt that Mangilia protensa and Pleurotoma (Drillia) amoena are one and the same species. The following is the description given by Suter for Mangilia protensa:

The shell is fusiform, elongated, turreted, thin and fragile. It is lightly axially costate and spirally lirate. The sculpture consists of subequidistant fine axial riblets, obsolete on the shoulder and below the periphery of the body whorl, 15 to 20 on the body-whorl. The interstices are of about the same width or slightly broader than the riblets. They are crossed and reticulated by fine spiral threads, 3 very fine and close together on the shoulder, 5 from the angle to the suture, occasionally with a few very fine interstitial threads, 15 to 20 on the body whorl. The crossing-points are sometimes slightly nodulous. The fasciole on the beak is finely striated. Sometimes the spiral sculpture is predominant, the spirals becoming much stronger, crossed only by flexuous axial strife. The colour of the shell is light flavescent with a white band encircling the whorls, but mostly inconspicuous. The spire is high, conic, turreted, about 1½ times the height of the aperture. The protoconch consists of 2½ smooth convex whorls. The shell contains 7 to 8 whorls, markedly convex, the base contracted. The suture is well marked. The aperture is slightly oblique, oval, angled above, produced into an oblique short and open siphonal canal, truncated below. The outer lip is thin, sometimes strengthened by the last axial riblet, with a shallow rounded infrasutural sinus. The columella is slightly concave above, convex and curved to the left below, where it is drawn out to a fine point. The inner lip is narrow and thin.

== Distribution ==
This marine species is endemic to New Zealand and occurs off North Island.
