= Neoguraleus trizonata =

Scientific classification
- Kingdom: Animalia
- Phylum: Mollusca
- Class: Gastropoda
- Subclass: Caenogastropoda
- Order: Neogastropoda
- Superfamily: Conoidea
- Family: Mangeliidae
- Genus: Neoguraleus
- Species: N. trizonata

Binomial name
- Neoguraleus trizonata (E. A. Smith, 1882)

Synonyms
- Daphnella trizonata (E. A. Smith, 1882); Mangilia trizonata (E. A. Smith, 1882); Pleurotoma (Mangilia) trizonata E. A. Smith, 1882 (basionym)

Species of gastropod

Neoguraleus trizonata is a species of sea snail, a marine gastropod mollusk in the family Mangeliidae.

This is a taxon inquirendum.

== Description ==
The length of the shell attains 8.7 mm, its diameter 3.5 mm.

(Original description in Latin) The shell is ovate, white, and faintly banded with light brown. On the upper whorls there are two bands, one situated above near the suture and the other at the base; on the body whorl there are three such bands. The shell consists of eight whorls: the first two are smooth and glassy, while the remaining whorls are somewhat convex and slightly constricted near their upper part. They are furnished with rounded ribs that fade away above before reaching the suture; on the body whorl there are nine ribs, which continue to the base. The surface is most beautifully sculptured with minute spiral striae and lines of growth. The aperture is narrow and linear, its length equalling about one-third of the total length of the shell. The outer lip is thickened within and bears an indistinct tooth near its upper part. The columella is covered with a finely granular callus. The sinus is small and very shallow.

== Distribution ==
This marine species occurs off the Philippines and New Caledonia.
