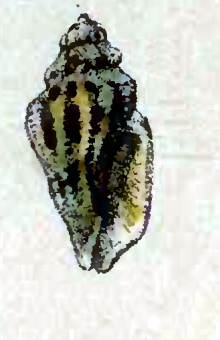
- Drawing of a shell of Macteola interrupta

Scientific classification
- Kingdom: Animalia
- Phylum: Mollusca
- Class: Gastropoda
- Subclass: Caenogastropoda
- Order: Neogastropoda
- Superfamily: Conoidea
- Family: Mangeliidae
- Genus: Macteola
- Species: M. interrupta

Binomial name
- Macteola interrupta (Reeve, 1846)

Synonyms
- Colombella segesta Duclos, 1850; Daphnella bella Pease, 1870; Macteola segesta (Duclos, 1850); Macteola segesta var. cinctura Hedley, 1922; Mangelia interrupta Reeve, 1846 (original combination); Pleurotoma gemmulata Deshayes, G.P., 1863

= Macteola interrupta =

Species of gastropod

Macteola interrupta is a species of sea snail, a marine gastropod mollusc in the family Mangeliidae.

== Description ==
The length of the shell attains 12 mm.

The shell is nodose at the shoulder. It shows strong, narrow, rounded ribs descending from the nodules. Its color is whitish, with hair-like, chocolate, revolving lines between the ribs, sometimes approximating into bands.

== Distribution ==
This marine species occurs off Queensland, Australia, the Kermadec Islands, New Zealand, the Loyalty Islands and the Philippines; also off New Caledonia and Mauritius.
