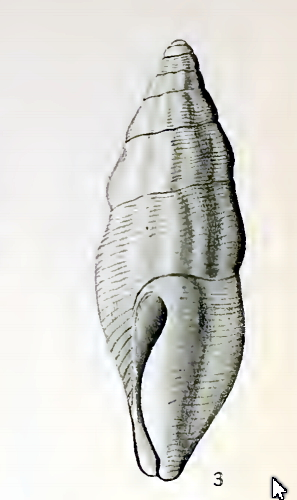
- Original image of a shell of Scrinium impendens

Scientific classification
- Kingdom: Animalia
- Phylum: Mollusca
- Class: Gastropoda
- Subclass: Caenogastropoda
- Order: Neogastropoda
- Superfamily: Conoidea
- Family: Mitromorphidae
- Genus: Scrinium
- Species: S. impendens

Binomial name
- Scrinium impendens (Verco, 1909)

Synonyms
- Mangilia impendens Verco, 1909 (original combination)

= Scrinium impendens =

Species of gastropod

Scrinium impendens is a species of sea snail, a marine gastropod mollusk in the family Mitromorphidae.

== Description ==
The length of the shell attains 6.4 mm (0.25 in), its diameter 2.5 mm (0.098 in).

(Original description) The solid, white shell contains 7 whorls, including the blunt protoconch of 2 smooth depressed convex turns. The spire-whorls are sloping, swollen above the linear somewhat undulating suture, and barely swollen below it. The base of the shell is slightly contracted. The aperture is oblong-oval, narrower behind, widely open in front, with a shallow notch. The outer lip is simple, sharp, thickened by a marked varix outside, which ascends roundly at the suture and bounds a shallow, wide posterior sinus. The profile is convex, barely sinused anteriorly. The axial ribs are roundly trigonal, sinuous, undulating the upper suture, most valid at the swelling of the whorl, half as wide as the interspaces, vanishing towards the base, and becoming obsolete towards the aperture. There are very crowded spiral incisions all over, and still finer sinuous axial growth scratches, finely granulating the surface.

== Distribution ==
This marine species is endemic to Australia and occurs off South Australia.
