= Neoguraleus huttoni =

Scientific classification
- Kingdom: Animalia
- Phylum: Mollusca
- Class: Gastropoda
- Subclass: Caenogastropoda
- Order: Neogastropoda
- Superfamily: Conoidea
- Family: Mangeliidae
- Genus: Neoguraleus
- Species: N. huttoni

Binomial name
- Neoguraleus huttoni (E. A. Smith, 1915)

Synonyms
- Mangilia huttoni E. A. Smith, 1915 (original combination)

Species of gastropod

Neoguraleus huttoni is a species of sea snail, a marine gastropod mollusk in the family Mangeliidae.

== Description ==
The shell reaches a maximum height of about 9 mm and a diameter of approximately 3.7 mm.

The shell is elongate-fusiform (spindle-shaped). The adult whorls are sculptured, typically showing pronounced axial ribs crossed by spiral cords, giving the surface a textured, net-like appearance.

The spire is relatively tall, while the siphonal canal is cut in proportion, giving the shell a somewhat shortened appearance at the base.

== Distribution ==
This marine species is endemic to New Zealand and occurs off the northern part of North Island.
