= Scrinium callimorphum =

Scientific classification
- Kingdom: Animalia
- Phylum: Mollusca
- Class: Gastropoda
- Subclass: Caenogastropoda
- Order: Neogastropoda
- Superfamily: Conoidea
- Family: Mitromorphidae
- Genus: Scrinium
- Species: S. callimorphum

Binomial name
- Scrinium callimorphum (Suter, 1917)

Synonyms
- † Euthria callimorpha Suter, 191 (original combination)

Extinct species of gastropod

Scrinium callimorphum is an extinct species of sea snail, a marine gastropod mollusk in the family Mitromorphidae.

== Description ==
The length of the shell attains 16 mm. S. callimorphum was a carnivorous gastropod that was first recorded in the Eocene period.

== Distribution ==
This extinct marine species is endemic to New Zealand, and the surrounding areas.
