= Neoguraleus deceptus =

Scientific classification
- Kingdom: Animalia
- Phylum: Mollusca
- Class: Gastropoda
- Subclass: Caenogastropoda
- Order: Neogastropoda
- Superfamily: Conoidea
- Family: Mangeliidae
- Genus: Neoguraleus
- Species: N. deceptus

Binomial name
- Neoguraleus deceptus A.W.B. Powell, 1942

Extinct species of gastropod

Neoguraleus deceptus is an extinct species of sea snail, a marine gastropod mollusk in the family Mangeliidae.

== Distribution ==
This extinct marine species is endemic to New Zealand and occurs in Cenozoic strata in Otago.
