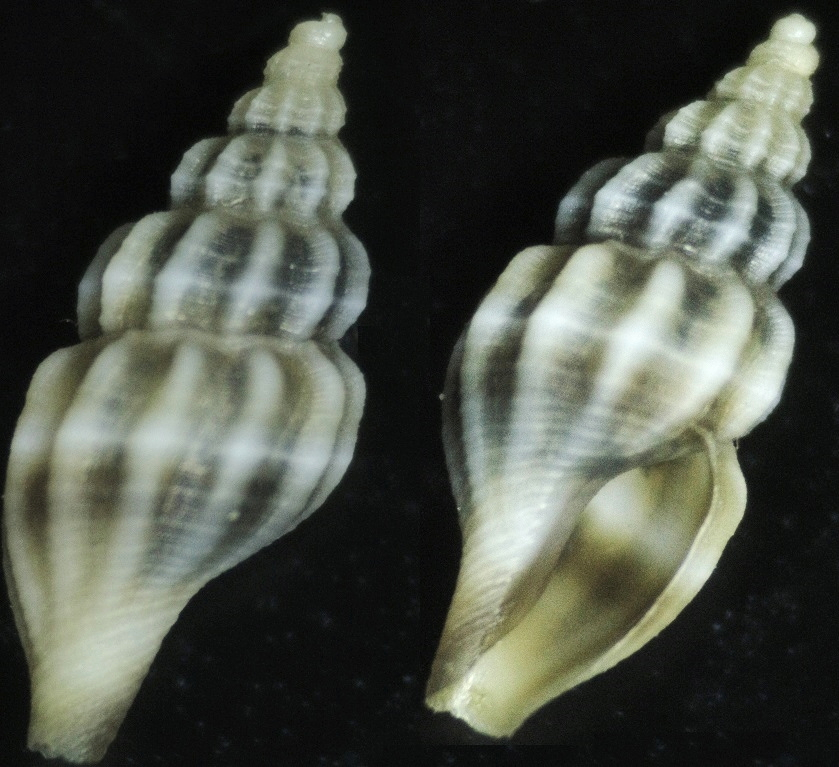
- Shells of Neoguraleus murdochi

Scientific classification
- Kingdom: Animalia
- Phylum: Mollusca
- Class: Gastropoda
- Subclass: Caenogastropoda
- Order: Neogastropoda
- Superfamily: Conoidea
- Family: Mangeliidae
- Genus: Neoguraleus; Powell, 1939

Type species
- Drillia sinclairi Gillies, 1882

Species
- See text

= Neoguraleus =

Genus of gastropods

Neoguraleus is a genus of sea snails, marine gastropod mollusks in the family Mangeliidae.

== Species ==
Species within the genus Neoguraleus include:

- Neoguraleus amoenus (E. A. Smith, 1884)
- Neoguraleus benthicolus Powell, 1942
- † Neoguraleus deceptus Powell, 1942
- † Neoguraleus filiferus Darragh, 2017
- Neoguraleus finlayi Powell, 1942
- † Neoguraleus hautotaraensis Vella, 1954
- Neoguraleus huttoni (E. A. Smith, 1915)
- Neoguraleus interruptus Powell, 1942
- † Neoguraleus lineatus (Marwick, 1928)
- Neoguraleus lyallensis (Murdoch, 1905)
- Neoguraleus manukauensis Powell, 1942
- † Neoguraleus morgani (Marwick, 1924)
- Neoguraleus murdochi (Finlay, 1924)
- † Neoguraleus ngatuturaensis (Bartrum & Powell, 1928)
- Neoguraleus nukumaruensis Powell, 1942
- Neoguraleus oruaensis Powell, 1942
- † Neoguraleus protensus (Hutton, 1885)
- Neoguraleus sandersonae (Bucknill, 1928)
- Neoguraleus sinclairi (Gillies, 1882)
- † Neoguraleus waihuaensis Powell, 1942

Taxon inquirendum

- Neoguraleus trizonata (E. A. Smith, 1882)

Species brought into synonymy

- Neoguraleus amoena [sic] : synonym of Neoguraleus amoenus (E. A. Smith, 1884)
- Neoguraleus benthicola [sic]: synonym of Neoguraleus benthicolus Powell, 1942
- Neoguraleus sinclairi (Smith, 1884): synonym of Neoguraleus finlayi Powell, 1942
- Neoguraleus tenebrosus Powell, 1926: synonym of Neoguraleus lyallensis (Murdoch, 1905)
- Neoguraleus whangaroaensis A.W.B. Powell, 1942: synonym of Neoguraleus sinclairi (T.B. Gillies, 1882)
