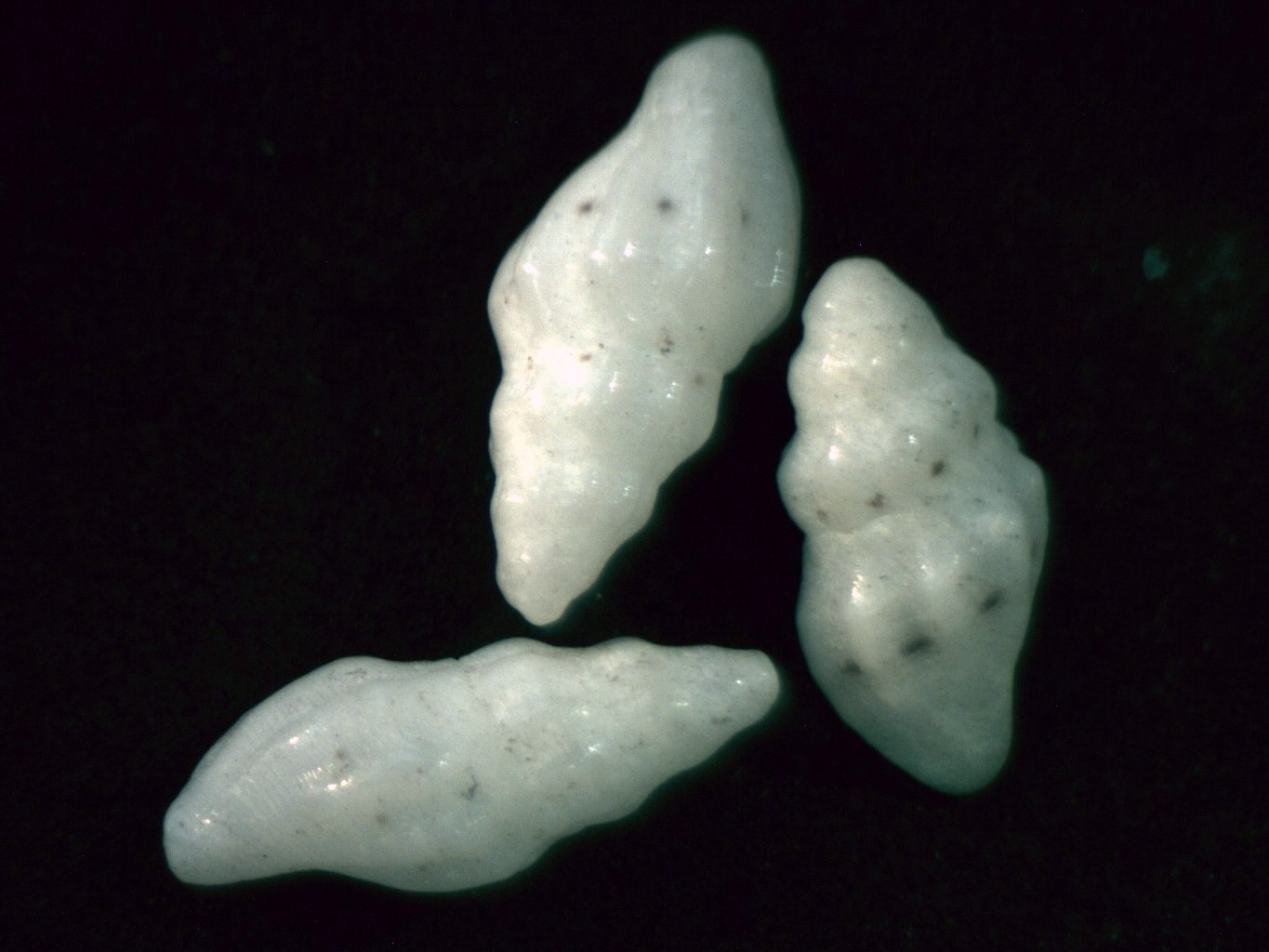
- Shells of Macteola theskela

Scientific classification
- Kingdom: Animalia
- Phylum: Mollusca
- Class: Gastropoda
- Subclass: Caenogastropoda
- Order: Neogastropoda
- Superfamily: Conoidea
- Family: Mangeliidae
- Genus: Macteola
- Species: M. theskela

Binomial name
- Macteola theskela (Melvill & Standen, 1895)

Synonyms
- Mangilia (Glyphosyoma) theskela Melvill & Standen, 1895 (original combination)

= Macteola theskela =

Species of gastropod

Macteola theskela is a species of sea snail, a marine gastropod mollusk in the family Mangeliidae.

== Description ==
The length of the shell attains 7.5 mm, its diameter 3 mm.

(Original description) The inner or columellar margin of the lip possesses seven or eight close and minute plicae. There is also one minute process at the parietal sinus. It is of a graceful attenuate fusiform shell, six-whorled, or perhaps seven, but the apex is broken off in the only specimen we have. It shows longitudinal ribs crossed by many lirae. The aperture is oblong. The pure whiteness of the shell is relieved by a row of brown spots between the ribs just above the sutures and in the middle of the body whorl.

== Distribution ==
This marine species occurs off Queensland, Australia, Vanuatu and the Loyalty Islands
