= Neoguraleus hautotaraensis =

Scientific classification
- Kingdom: Animalia
- Phylum: Mollusca
- Class: Gastropoda
- Subclass: Caenogastropoda
- Order: Neogastropoda
- Superfamily: Conoidea
- Family: Mangeliidae
- Genus: Neoguraleus
- Species: N. hautotaraensis

Binomial name
- Neoguraleus hautotaraensis Vella, 1954

Extinct species of gastropod

Neoguraleus hautotaraensis is an extinct species of sea snail, a marine gastropod mollusk in the family Mangeliidae.

== Description ==
The length of the shell attains 6 mm, its diameter is 2.4 mm.

== Distribution ==
This extinct marine species is endemic to New Zealand and occurs in Upper Nukumaruan strata.
