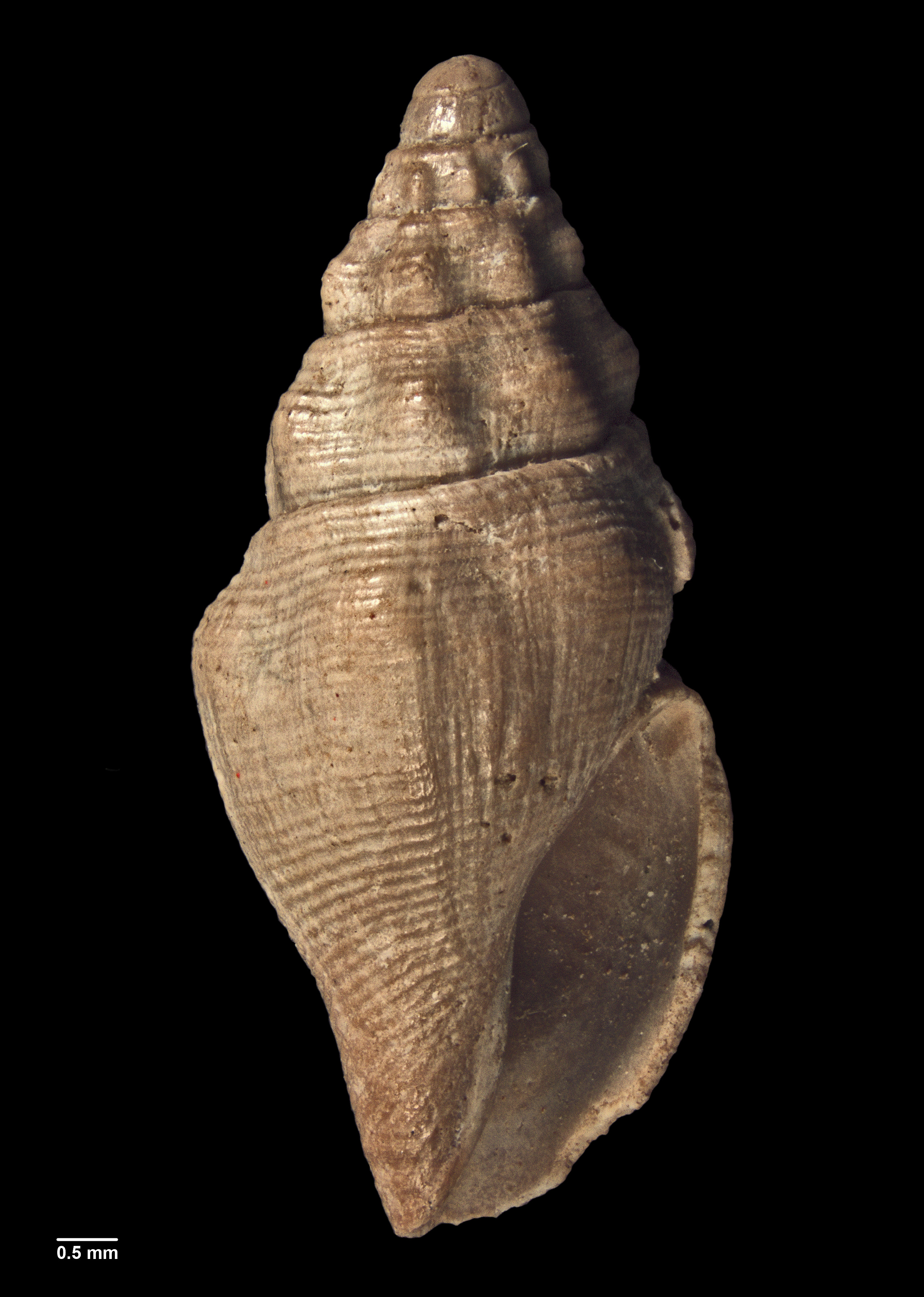
- Holotype from Auckland War Memorial Museum

Scientific classification
- Kingdom: Animalia
- Phylum: Mollusca
- Class: Gastropoda
- Subclass: Caenogastropoda
- Order: Neogastropoda
- Family: Mitromorphidae
- Genus: Scrinium
- Species: †S. duplicatum

Binomial name
- †Scrinium duplicatum A. W. B. Powell, 1944

= Scrinium duplicatum =

Scrinium duplicatum Temporal range: early Miocene

Extinct species of gastropod

Scrinium duplicatum is an extinct species of sea snail, a marine gastropod mollusc in the family Mitromorphidae. Fossils of the species date to the early Miocene, and occur in the strata of the Port Phillip Basin of Victoria, Australia.

== Description ==
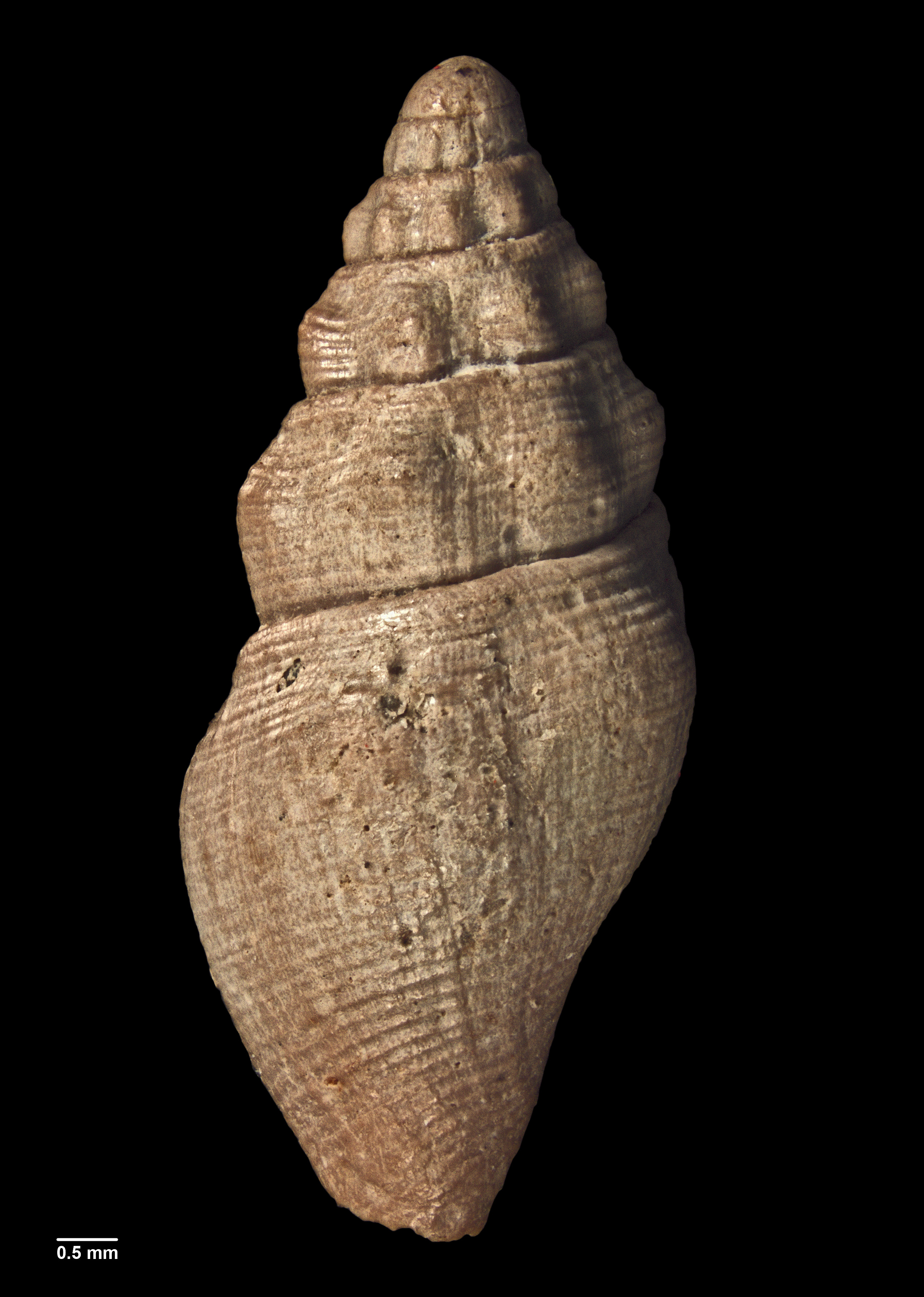
Reverse view of holotype

In the original description, Powell described the species as follows:

Resembles [Scrinium haroldi], but slightly larger, more robust, with a depressed. dome-shaped protoconch, medially angulate whorls, and a moderately strong subsutural fold bearing two linear-spaced spiral cords. Whorls 6, including protoconch. Axials heavy, broadly rounded, not extended over base, 8-10 per whorl (8 on penultimate, in holotype). Spiral sculpture of regular linear-spaced cords, 14 on the penultimate (including two on subsutural fold), and about 38 on body-whorl and base.

The holotype of the species measures 10 mm (0.39 in) in height and 4.5 mm (0.18 in) in diameter.

== Taxonomy ==
The species was first described by A.W.B. Powell in 1944. The holotype was collected from Torquay, Victoria, at an unknown date prior to 1944, and is held by the Auckland War Memorial Museum.

== Distribution ==
This extinct marine species dates to the early Miocene, and occurs in the strata of the Port Phillip Basin of Victoria, Australia, known from the Puebla Formation.
