= Scrinium ordinatum =

Scientific classification
- Kingdom: Animalia
- Phylum: Mollusca
- Class: Gastropoda
- Subclass: Caenogastropoda
- Order: Neogastropoda
- Superfamily: Conoidea
- Family: Mitromorphidae
- Genus: Scrinium
- Species: S. ordinatum

Binomial name
- Scrinium ordinatum (Hutton, 1877)

Synonyms
- † Cominella ordinatis Hutton, 1877

Extinct species of gastropod

Scrinium ordinatum is an extinct species of sea snail, a marine gastropod mollusk in the family Mitromorphidae.

== Distribution ==
This extinct marine species is endemic to New Zealand.
