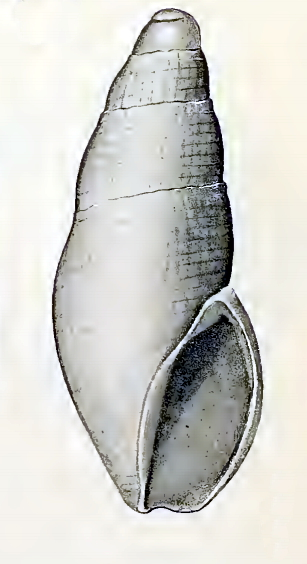
- Original image of a shell of Scrinium gatliffi

Scientific classification
- Kingdom: Animalia
- Phylum: Mollusca
- Class: Gastropoda
- Subclass: Caenogastropoda
- Order: Neogastropoda
- Superfamily: Conoidea
- Family: Mitromorphidae
- Genus: Scrinium
- Species: S. gatliffi

Binomial name
- Scrinium gatliffi (Verco, 1909)

Synonyms
- Drillia gatliffi Verco 1909 (original combination); Mangilia gatliffi Gatliff and Gabriel, 1910

= Scrinium gatliffi =

Species of gastropod

Scrinium gatliffi is a species of sea snail, a marine gastropod mollusk in the family Mitromorphidae.

== Description ==
The length of the shell attains 5.25 mm, its diameter 2.25 mm.

(Original description) The small, white, solid shell is shining, elongate-oval and blunt. It consists of 5 whorls, including a protoconch of 2 smooth convex whorls, and a very flatly convex apex. The spire-whorls are sloping convex. The suture is distinct, subcanaliculate, undulating and margined. The body whorl is nearly as long as the spire, slightly attenuated at the base and truncate. The aperture is oval, slightly narrowed behind, wide in front, notched and without a siphonal canal. The outer lip is straightly convex, with a shallow, wide sinus behind, sharp, not inflected, smooth within. The inner lip is narrow, smooth, applied, free at the front, with a callus posteriorly at the junction with the outer lip. The columella is subconcave, joining the body whorl at a very open angle. The spiral sulcations are equidistant, 9 in the penultimate, 17 in the body whorl. The axial accremental striae, distinct under the microscope, cross the spirals, sinuous, comparatively distant, especially on the body whorl.

== Distribution ==
This marine species is endemic to Australia and occurs off South Australia and Victoria
