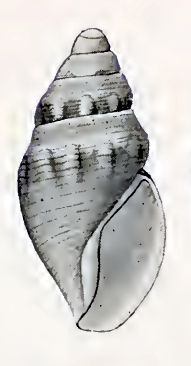
- Original image of a shell of Scrinium neozelanicum

Scientific classification
- Kingdom: Animalia
- Phylum: Mollusca
- Class: Gastropoda
- Subclass: Caenogastropoda
- Order: Neogastropoda
- Superfamily: Conoidea
- Family: Mitromorphidae
- Genus: Scrinium
- Species: S. neozelanicum

Binomial name
- Scrinium neozelanicum (Suter, 1908)

Synonyms
- Bela neozelanica Suter, 1908 (original combination); Scrinium neozelanica [sic] (incorrect gender ending)

= Scrinium neozelanicum =

Species of gastropod

Scrinium neozelanicum is a species of sea snail, a marine gastropod mollusk in the family Mitromorphidae.

== Description ==
The length of the shell attains 10 mm, its diameter 4.8 mm.

(Original description) The small, ovate, solid shell is slightly turriculate. It shows blunt axial ribs and spiral lirae, maculated with brown and white below the shoulder. The sculpture consists of rather distant, low, rounded axial ribs, nine to ten on the body whorl, extending on the spire whorls from the angle to the suture below, but only over the periphery on the body whorl. They are crossed by subequal, flat, spiral lirae, fine on the shoulder, broad upon the base, separated by linear interstices. The colour of the protoconch is flavescent, the other spire whorls are yellowish or brownish white, maculated with brown and white below the shoulder. The ribs are usually white, the interstices brown. The body whorl is light brown below the maculations on the periphery. The aperture is fulvous inside. The spire is conic, turriculate, very little higher than the aperture. The protoconch is papillate and consists of two smooth convex whorls. The shell contains 6 whorls, the last high in proportion, with a sloping, broad, and lightly excavated shoulder, slightly convex below the inconspicuous angle. The body whorl is convex, but faintly contracted at the base. The suture is distinct, but little impressed. The aperture is lightly oblique, elongately oval, angled above, with a rudimentary, broad, and truncated siphonal canal below. The outer lip is convex, rather thin and sharp, smooth inside, with a very slight broad sinus below the suture. The columella is vertical, excavated toward the parietal wall, slightly turned to the left below. The inner lip is narrow, thin, spreading over the convex parietal wall, tapering to a fine point below and extending to the base of the siphonal canal. The oval operculum is very small, length 2.1 mm., the nucleus apical.

== Distribution ==
This marine species is endemic to New Zealand off Northland to Bay of Plenty.
