= Neoguraleus benthicolus =

Scientific classification
- Kingdom: Animalia
- Phylum: Mollusca
- Class: Gastropoda
- Subclass: Caenogastropoda
- Order: Neogastropoda
- Superfamily: Conoidea
- Family: Mangeliidae
- Genus: Neoguraleus
- Species: N. benthicolus

Binomial name
- Neoguraleus benthicolus A.W.B. Powell, 1942

Synonyms
- Neoguraleus benthicola Powell, 1942

Species of gastropod

Neoguraleus benthicolus is a species of sea snail, a marine gastropod mollusk in the family Mangeliidae.

== Description ==
The length of the shell attains 8 mm, its diameter is 3 mm.

== Distribution ==
This marine species is endemic to New Zealand and occurs off South Island.
