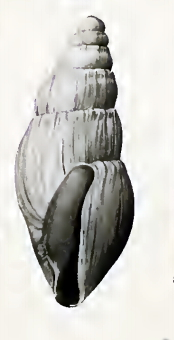
- Original image of a shell of Scrinium furtivum

Scientific classification
- Kingdom: Animalia
- Phylum: Mollusca
- Class: Gastropoda
- Subclass: Caenogastropoda
- Order: Neogastropoda
- Superfamily: Conoidea
- Family: Mitromorphidae
- Genus: Scrinium
- Species: S. furtivum

Binomial name
- Scrinium furtivum Hedley, 1922

= Scrinium furtivum =

Species of gastropod

Scrinium furtivum is a species of sea snail, a marine gastropod mollusk in the family Mitromorphidae.

== Description ==
The length of the shell attains 7.5 mm, with a diameter of 3 mm.

(Original description) The small, very solid shell is ovate-oblong and rounded at either end. It contains six whorls, two forming the low protoconch, convex, and slightly constricted below the deeply impressed suture. Its color is vinaceous-buff, sometimes with a white zone of its own breadth below the suture, and half a dozen evenly spaced narrow white lines on the remainder of the whorl. The color of the columella is terra-cotta, and the aperture is orange-cinnamon with a buff zone.

Sculpture: In general, the shell is smooth. On the upper whorls, about ten low nodular ribs are scarcely distinguishable. The lines of growth are marked by numerous irregular scratches. A few evanescent spiral grooves may or may not appear on the body whorl. The aperture is wide and smooth within. The outer lip is simple. The sinus is represented by an arch at the summit. The inner lip has a thin callus, which at the basal axis meets at an acute angle with a thicker callus that rises to form a reflected border to the short and very broad siphonal canal. The columella is vertical, flattened, and slightly twisted.

== Distribution ==
This marine species is endemic to Australia and occurs off the coasts of New South Wales and Victoria.
