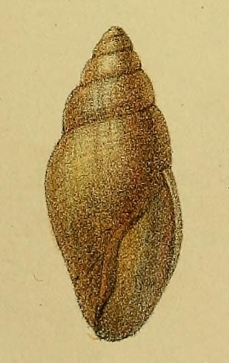
- Shell of Scrinium brazieri (holotype)

Scientific classification
- Kingdom: Animalia
- Phylum: Mollusca
- Class: Gastropoda
- Subclass: Caenogastropoda
- Order: Neogastropoda
- Superfamily: Conoidea
- Family: Mitromorphidae
- Genus: Scrinium
- Species: S. brazieri

Binomial name
- Scrinium brazieri (E. A. Smith, 1892)

Synonyms
- Apaturris brazieri Hedley, 1918; Mitromorpha brazieri E. A. Smith, 1892 (original combination)

= Scrinium brazieri =

Species of gastropod

Scrinium brazieri is a species of sea snail, a marine gastropod mollusk in the family Mitromorphidae.

== Description ==
The length of the shell attains 6½ mm, its diameter 3 mm; length of the aperture: 3⅓ mm, its diameter 1¼ mm.

(Original description of Mitromorpha brazieri in Latin) The shell is ovately-fusiform, spirally thinly-striated, and sculptured with growth lines. It is pale brownish and painted with indistinct transverse lines articulated with white and red. There are 5 whorls. The uppermost two whorls (the nucleus) are large, globose, smooth, shining, and horny. The remaining whorls are somewhat convex and are separated by a distinct, slightly oblique suture. The body whorl is elongated and only slightly contracted anteriorly. The aperture is elongated and pale brownish inside, being broadly channelled anteriorly. The outer lip is thin. The columella is slightly concave above, obliquely twisted below, and covered with a thin, shining callus.

== Distribution ==
This marine species is endemic to Australia and occurs off New South Wales and South Australia
