= Neoguraleus filiferus =

Scientific classification
- Kingdom: Animalia
- Phylum: Mollusca
- Class: Gastropoda
- Subclass: Caenogastropoda
- Order: Neogastropoda
- Superfamily: Conoidea
- Family: Mangeliidae
- Genus: Neoguraleus
- Species: N. filiferus

Binomial name
- Neoguraleus filiferus Darragh, 2017

Extinct species of gastropod

Neoguraleus filiferus is an extinct species of sea snail, a marine gastropod mollusk in the family Mangeliidae.

== Distribution ==
This extinct marine species is endemic to Australia and occurs in Late Eocene strata in Western Australia.
