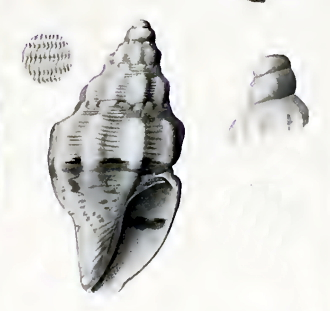
- Image of a shell of Macteola anomala

Scientific classification
- Kingdom: Animalia
- Phylum: Mollusca
- Class: Gastropoda
- Subclass: Caenogastropoda
- Order: Neogastropoda
- Superfamily: Conoidea
- Family: Mangeliidae
- Genus: Macteola
- Species: M. anomala

Binomial name
- Macteola anomala (Angas, 1877)

Synonyms
- Mangelia anomala (Angas, 1877); Murex anomala (Angas, 1877); Purpura (Cronia) anomala Angas, 1877 (original combination)

= Macteola anomala =

Species of gastropod

Macteola anomala is a species of sea snail, a marine gastropod mollusk in the family Mangeliidae.

== Description ==
The length of the shell varies between 8 mm and 12 mm.

The shell is rather solid. It is light brown, with a darker, black-spotted median band, and undulating longitudinal stripes, which are more prominent near the base of the body whorl.

In fresh specimens a delicate grain sculpture is visible under the lens. The colour varies. There may be only a peripheral row of separate intercostal brown spots, or beneath these there may run a continuous orange zone, anterior to which the shell may be faintly suffused with pink.

== Distribution ==
This marine species is endemic to Australia and occurs off New South Wales, South Australia, Tasmania, Victoria and Western Australia.
