= Neoguraleus manukauensis =

Scientific classification
- Kingdom: Animalia
- Phylum: Mollusca
- Class: Gastropoda
- Subclass: Caenogastropoda
- Order: Neogastropoda
- Superfamily: Conoidea
- Family: Mangeliidae
- Genus: Neoguraleus
- Species: N. manukauensis

Binomial name
- Neoguraleus manukauensis A.W.B. Powell, 1942

Species of gastropod

Neoguraleus manukauensis is a species of sea snail, a marine gastropod mollusk in the family Mangeliidae.

== Description ==
The length of the shell attains 12.5 mm, its diameter 5 mm.

== Distribution ==
This marine species is endemic to New Zealand and occurs off Manukau Harbour, North Island.
