= Neoguraleus ngatuturaensis =

Scientific classification
- Kingdom: Animalia
- Phylum: Mollusca
- Class: Gastropoda
- Subclass: Caenogastropoda
- Order: Neogastropoda
- Superfamily: Conoidea
- Family: Mangeliidae
- Genus: Neoguraleus
- Species: N. ngatuturaensis

Binomial name
- Neoguraleus ngatuturaensis (Bartrum & Powell, 1928)

Synonyms
- Austrofusus (Neocola) ngatuturaensis Bartrum & Powell, 1928

Extinct species of gastropod

Neoguraleus ngatuturaensis is an extinct species of sea snail, a marine gastropod mollusk in the family Mangeliidae.

== Description ==
The length of the shell attains 24 mm, its diameter 14.8 mm.

== Distribution ==
This extinct marine species is endemic to New Zealand and Australia.
