= Cape Brewster =

Headland in Sermersooq, Greenland

Cape Brewster Kangikajik (Greenlandic)
- Headland
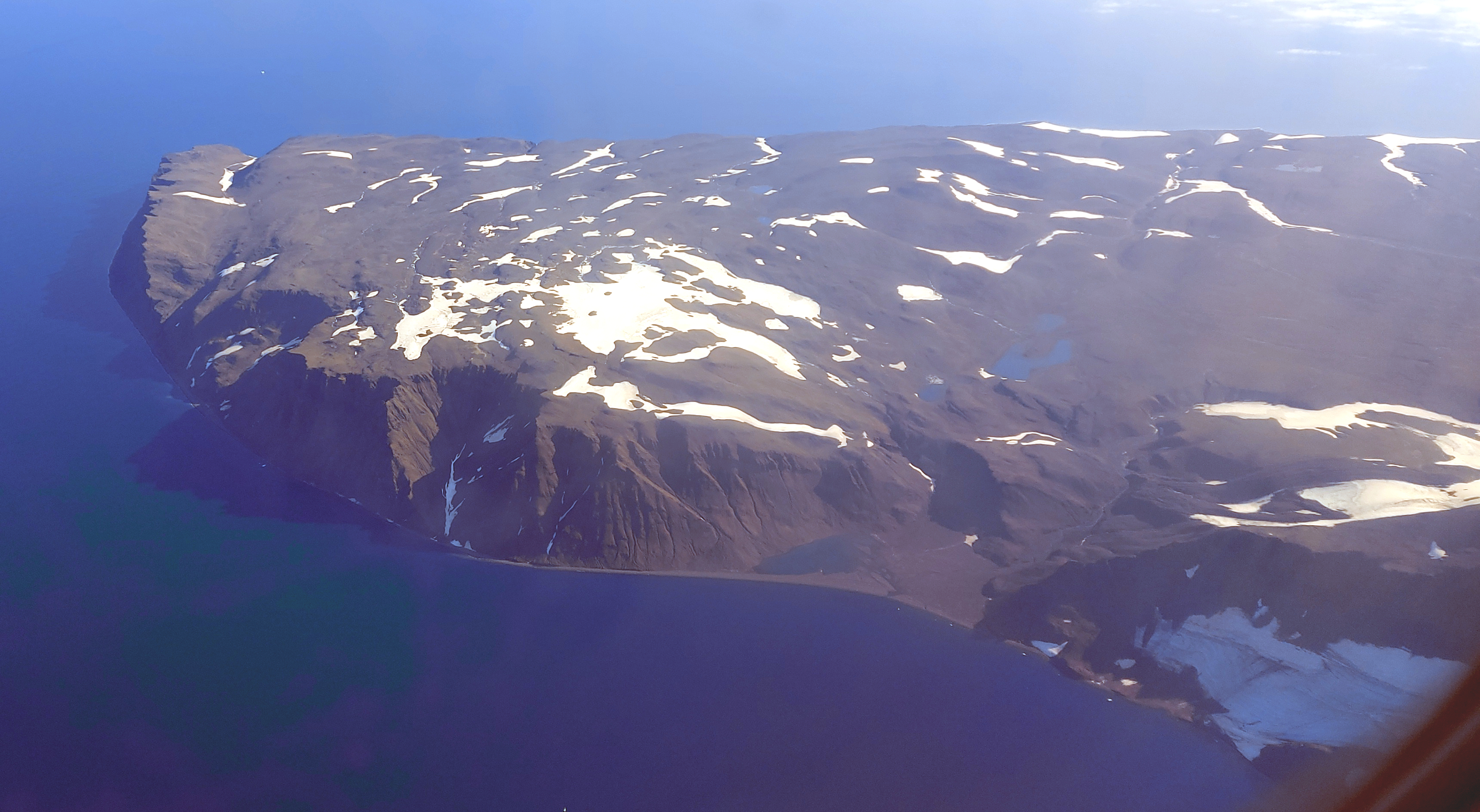

- Coordinates: 70°9′N 22°3′W
- Location: Sermersooq, Greenland
- Offshore water bodies: Greenland Sea

Area
  - Total: Arctic
- Elevation: 1200

Cape Brewster (Danish: Kap Brewster; Greenlandic: Kangikajik, meaning 'the bad cape') is a headland in the Greenland Sea, east Greenland, Sermersooq municipality.

== History ==
This headland was named Cape Brewster by William Scoresby (1789 – 1857) in 1822 to honour his friend, inventor David Brewster (1781–1868).

== Geography ==
Cape Brewster is the easternmost point of the jagged and mountainous Savoia Peninsula and the northernmost point of the Blosseville Coast.

It is located at the end of the southern side of the mouth of the Scoresby Sound, opposite Cape Tobin (Uunarteq). The cape lies in the desolate and impressive area of the southern shore of the sound with steep dark basalt walls rising between 1,000 and 2,000 m (3,280-6,560 ft).

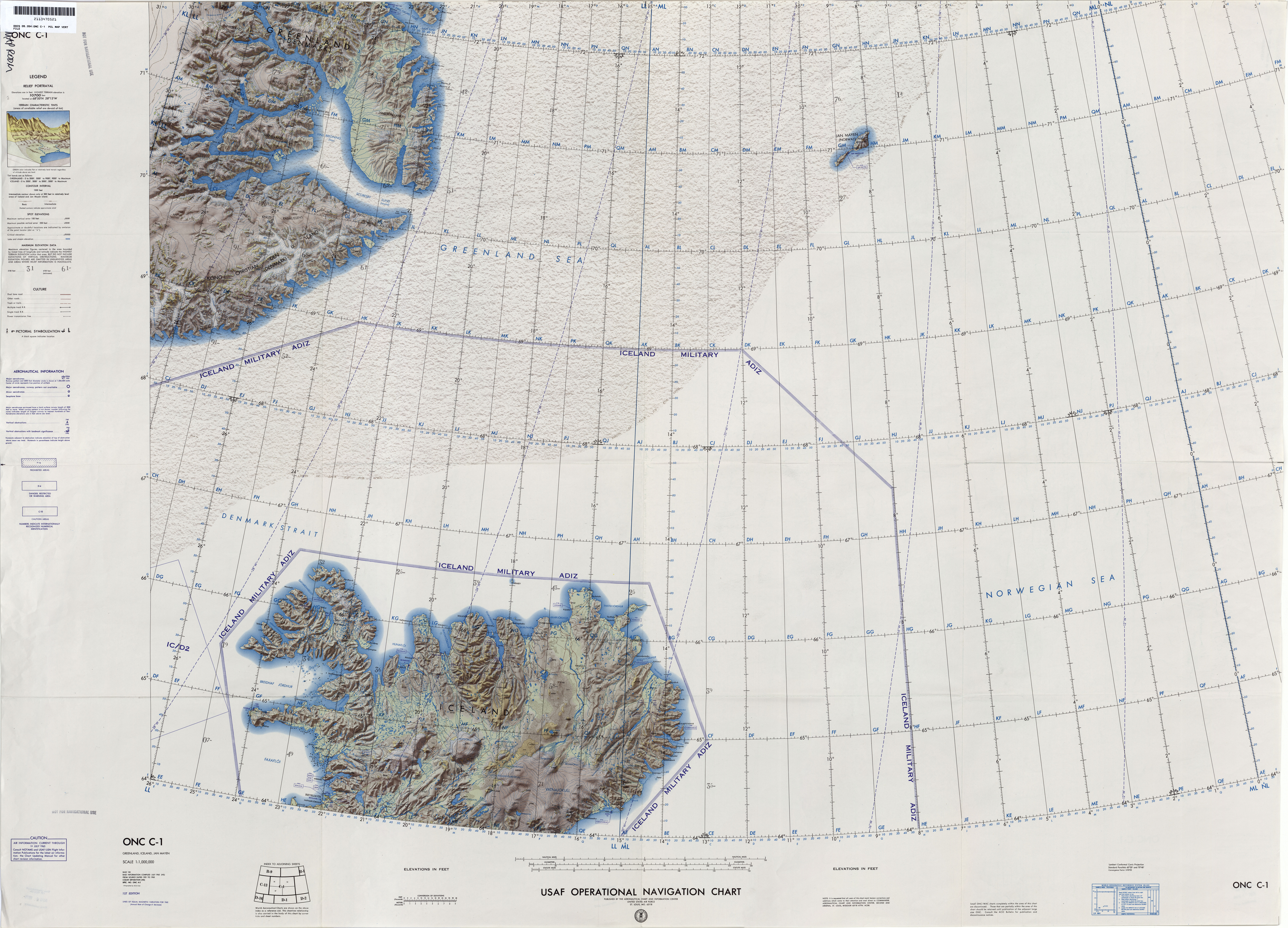
Map of NE Greenland and Iceland.

== See also ==
- Geography of Greenland
- Steward Island
