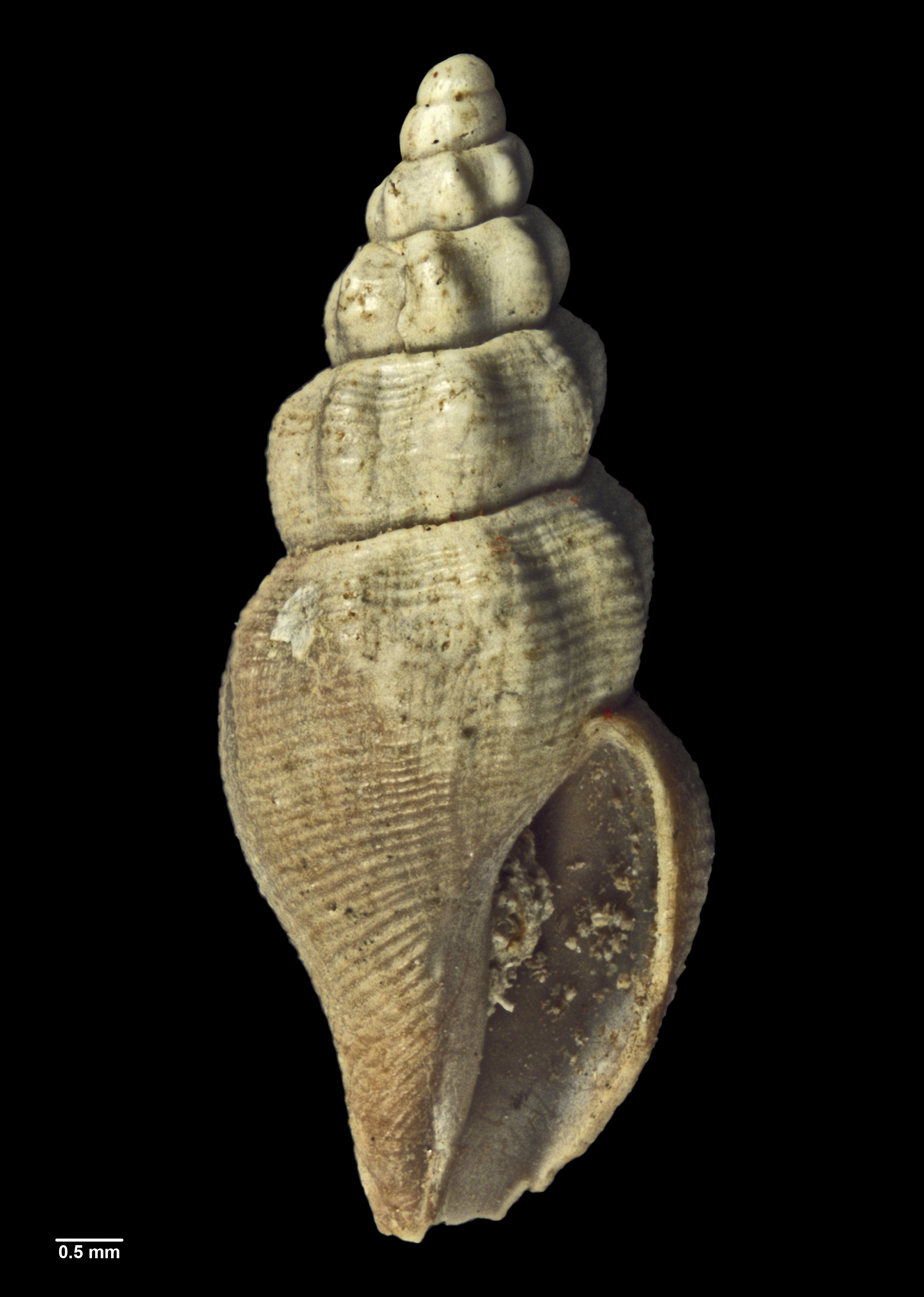
- Holotype from Auckland War Memorial Museum

Scientific classification
- Kingdom: Animalia
- Phylum: Mollusca
- Class: Gastropoda
- Subclass: Caenogastropoda
- Order: Neogastropoda
- Family: Mitromorphidae
- Genus: Scrinium
- Species: †S. haroldi

Binomial name
- †Scrinium haroldi A. W. B. Powell, 1944

= Scrinium haroldi =

Scrinium haroldi Temporal range: early Miocene

Extinct species of gastropod

Scrinium haroldi is an extinct species of sea snail, a marine gastropod mollusc in the family Mitromorphidae. Fossils of the species date to the early Miocene, and occur in the strata of the Port Phillip Basin of Victoria, Australia.

== Description ==
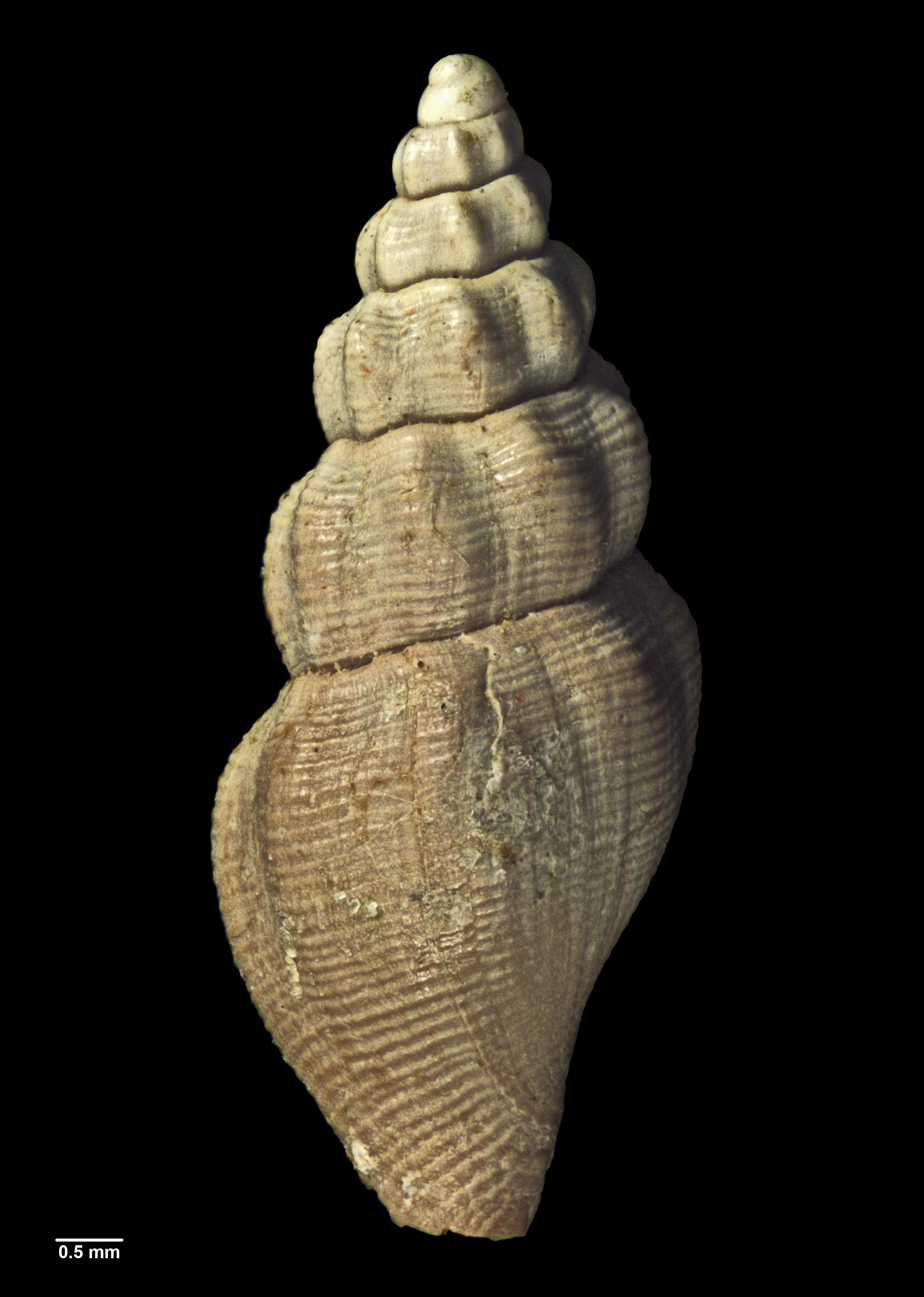
Reverse view of holotype

In the original description, Powell described the species as follows:

Shell small, ovate-fusiform, aperture less than half shell height. Whorls 6½, including smooth, blunt-tipped, rather narrow protoconch of 2 whorls. Axial sculpture of broad, heavy folds, extending from suture to suture, but not over the base, 8 on the penultimate. Spiral sculpture of regular linear-spaced cords, 14 on the penultimate and about 38 on body-whorl and base. Shoulder flattened, not prominent. No subsutural fold.

The holotype of the species measures 9 mm (0.35 in) in height and 3.9 mm (0.15 in) in diameter.

== Taxonomy ==
The species was first described by A.W.B. Powell in 1944. The holotype was collected from Torquay, Victoria, at an unknown date prior to 1944, and is held by the Auckland War Memorial Museum.

== Distribution ==
This extinct marine species dates to the early Miocene, and occurs in the strata of the Port Phillip Basin of Victoria, Australia, known from the Puebla Formation.
