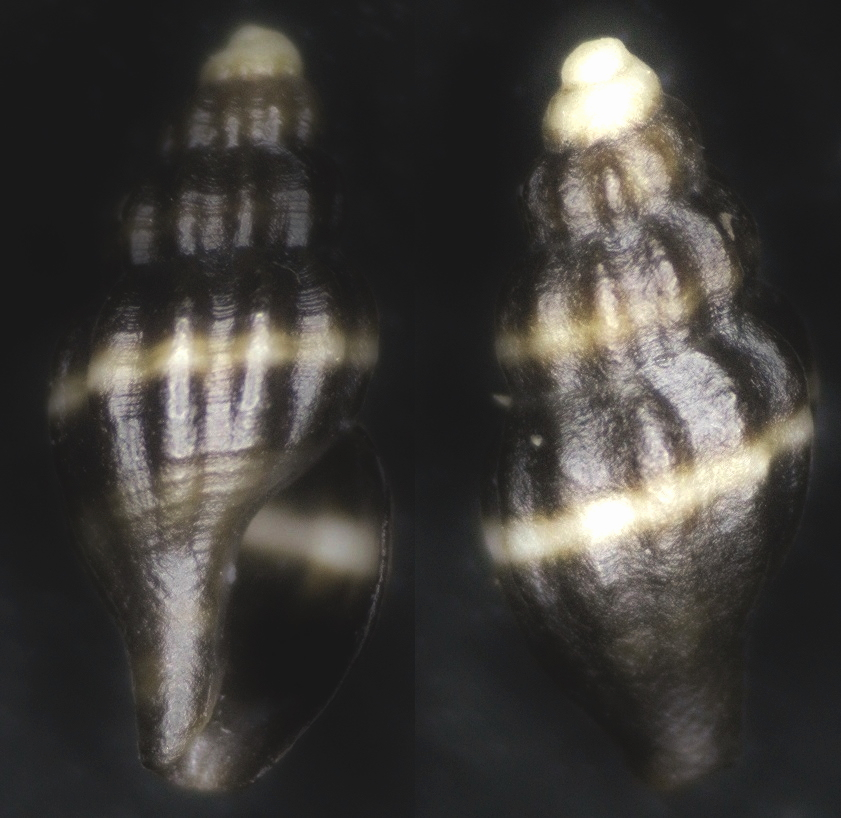

Scientific classification
- Kingdom: Animalia
- Phylum: Mollusca
- Class: Gastropoda
- Subclass: Caenogastropoda
- Order: Neogastropoda
- Superfamily: Conoidea
- Family: Mangeliidae
- Genus: Neoguraleus
- Species: N. finlayi

Binomial name
- Neoguraleus finlayi A.W.B. Powell, 1942

= Neoguraleus finlayi =

Species of gastropod

Neoguraleus finlayi is a species of sea snail, a marine gastropod mollusk in the family Mangeliidae.

== Description ==
The length of the shell attains 10 mm, its diameter 4 mm.

The small, solid shell is ovate and subturriculated. It is axially costate and spirally lirate, usually with 2 brown spiral bands. The sculpture consistis of rounded and rather low axial ribs, 10 to 16 on the body whorl. The interstices are of about the same width as the ribs, which are mostly obsolete on the very narrow shoulder or depression of the lower whorls, continued nearly to the base. They are crossed by more or less distinct spiral lirae, continuous between and across the ribs, stouter upon the neck of the siphonal canal. The colour of the shell is light flavescent, with 2 reddish or brown intercostal bands at the suture, the lower of them generally becoming very broad on the body whorl, and extending to the margin of the flattish fascicle below. Very often these bands are absent, or the apex and the fasciole only are brown. The spire is conic, scalar and somewhat higher than the aperture. The protoconch is smooth, with a flatly rounded nucleus. The shell contains 8 whorls, the earlier ones flattish, the others convex, with a narrow shoulder or depression. The base of the shell is contracted. The suture is impressed and undulating. The aperture is oblique, narrowly ovate, angled above and produced below into a short broad siphonal canal, slightly oblique and not emarginate at the base. The outer lip is strengthened by the last rib, flatly convex, sharp and with a shallow rounded sinus a little below the suture. The columella is faintly arcuate, vertical, drawn out to a narrow ridge towards the siphonal canal. The inner lip is smooth, thin and narrow.

== Distribution ==
This marine species is endemic to New Zealand and occurs off South Island; as a fossil in Upper Pleistocene strata.
