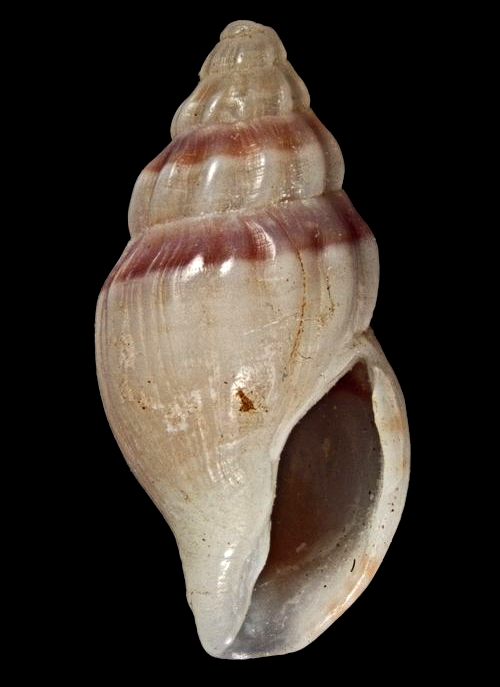
- Shell of Neoguraleus sandersonae (holotype in the Auckland War Memorial Museum)

Scientific classification
- Kingdom: Animalia
- Phylum: Mollusca
- Class: Gastropoda
- Subclass: Caenogastropoda
- Order: Neogastropoda
- Superfamily: Conoidea
- Family: Mangeliidae
- Genus: Neoguraleus
- Species: N. sandersonae

Binomial name
- Neoguraleus sandersonae (Bucknill, 1927)

Synonyms
- Scrinium sandersonae Bucknill, 1927 (original combination)

= Neoguraleus sandersonae =

Species of gastropod

Neoguraleus sandersonae is a species of sea snail, a marine gastropod mollusk in the family Mangeliidae.

== Description ==
The shell of Neoguraleus sandersonae is small, typically reaching lengths of approximately 5–7 mm. It is characterized by a fusiform shape with a moderately high spire. The sculpture consists of fine axial ribs crossed by spiral lirae, giving the shell a cancellate appearance. The coloration is generally a pale brownish-white, often with subtle darker spiral bands. The aperture is narrow, with a short siphonal canal, and the outer lip is slightly thickened.

== Distribution ==
This species is endemic to New Zealand, primarily found in deep waters off the North Island and South Island. It occurs at depths ranging from 100 to 500 meters, typically on soft substrates such as mud or fine sand.
