= Steward Island =

Island in Sermersooq, Greenland

Steward Island Steward Ø
- Location within Greenland

Geography
- Location: North Atlantic Ocean; Southeastern Greenland
- Coordinates: 69°54′N 22°51′W
- Length: 11.5 km (7.15 mi)
- Width: 2.4 km (1.49 mi)
- Highest elevation: 640 m (2100 ft)

Administration
- Greenland
- Municipality: Sermersooq

Demographics
- Population: 0

Steward Island (Danish: Steward Ø; also Stewart Ø in some sources) is an uninhabited island in King Christian IX Land, at the eastern end of Greenland. Administratively it is part of the Sermersooq municipality.

The island is mountainous and clearly visible from a distance. According to mariners' reports the island is a good landmark for vessels approaching Greenland from the east.

== Geography ==
Steward is a coastal island of the Blosseville Coast located in a bay off the Savoia Peninsula. It lies 39 km to the SW of Cape Brewster and 7.5 km to the northeast of the small Manby Peninsula. To the west there is a 7 kilometres (4 miles) wide glacier discharging in the bay and the island's western end is attached to the terminus of the glacier, so that it almost forms a peninsula with the mainland.

The island is 11.5 kilometres (7 miles) long with a maximum width of 2.4 kilometres (1 mile). The small Dunholm islets (Dunholm Øer) lie 4 km to the east and the 1,683.7 m (5,524 ft) high Pyramiden, an ultra-prominent peak rises above the glacier off the northern end of the island at 70°1′6″N 22°58′26″W.

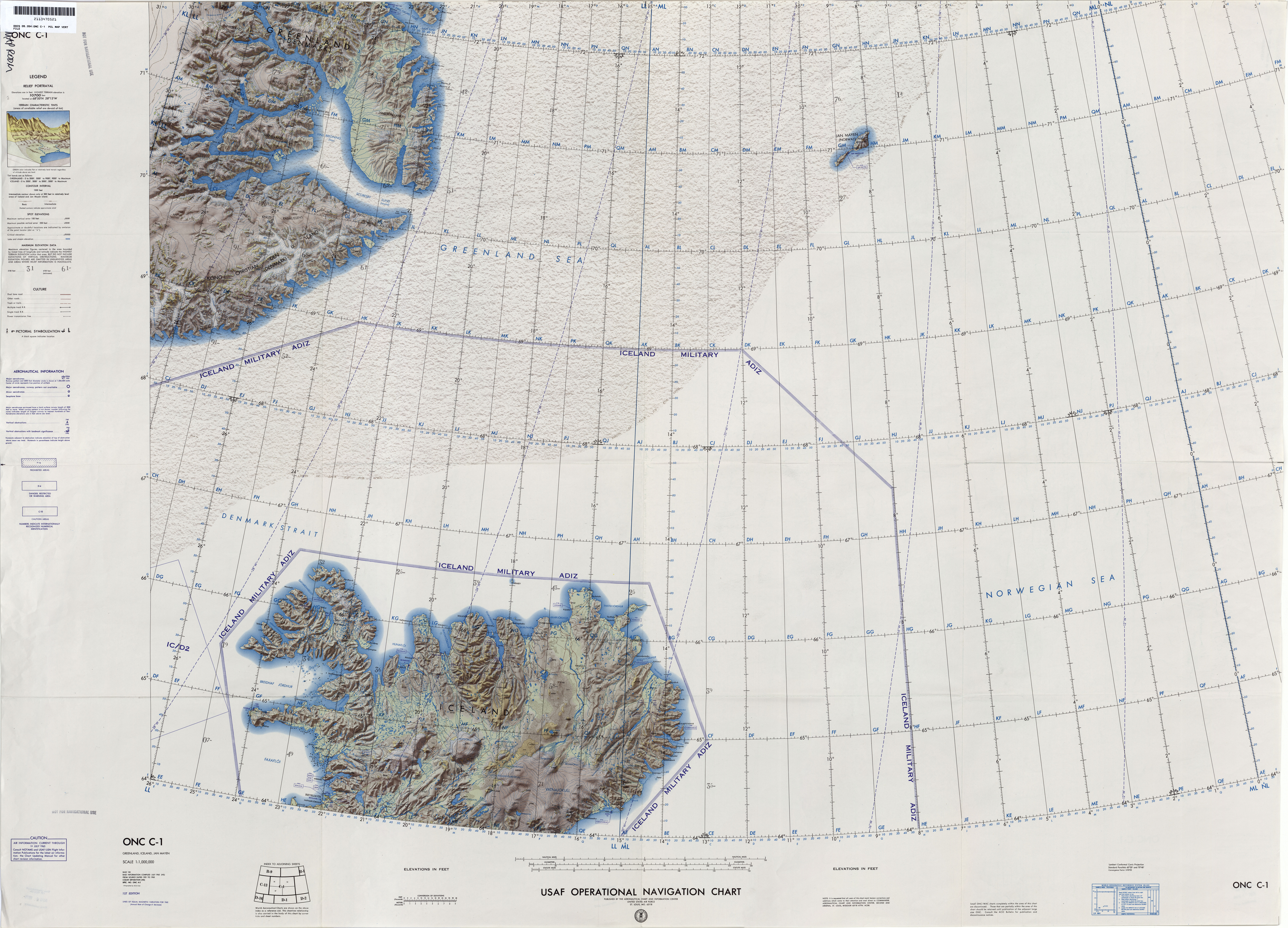
Map of NE Greenland and Iceland.

== See also ==
- List of islands of Greenland
