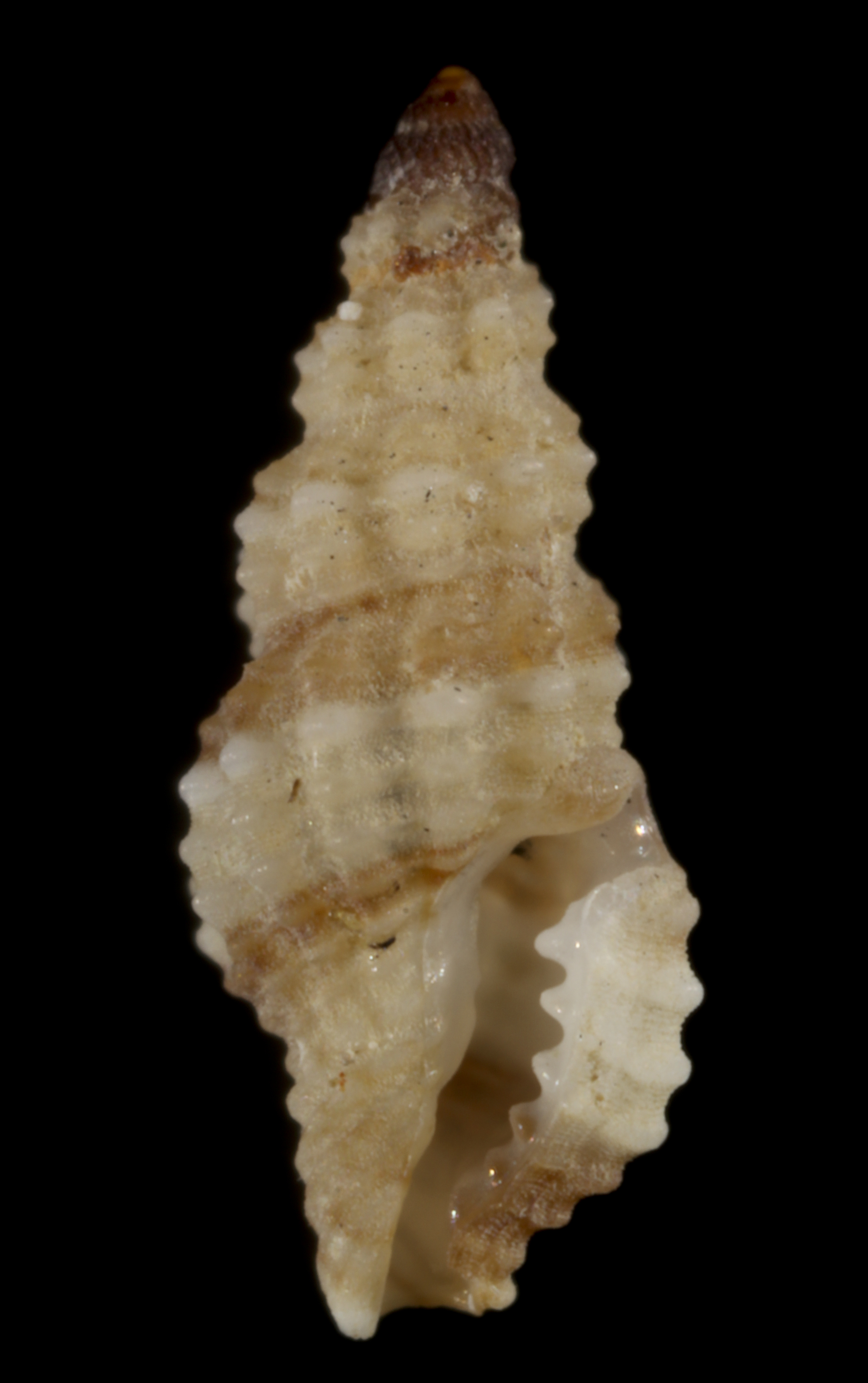
- Shell of Kermia melanoxytum (Hervier, 1896) (specimen at MNHN, Paris)

Scientific classification
- Kingdom: Animalia
- Phylum: Mollusca
- Class: Gastropoda
- Subclass: Caenogastropoda
- Order: Neogastropoda
- Superfamily: Conoidea
- Family: Raphitomidae
- Genus: Kermia; Oliver, 1915

Type species
- Kermia benhami Oliver, 1915

Species
- See text

Synonyms
- Clathurina Melvill, 1917

= Kermia =

Genus of gastropods

Kermia is a genus of sea snails, marine gastropod mollusks in the family Raphitomidae.

This genus is closely related to Pseudodaphnella Boettger, 1895. They form together a genus-complex with a highly underestimated diversity, leading to intermixed clades. The lack of morphologic criteria requires the generic assignment of several species clearly to be reconsidered.

== Description ==
The elongate, fusiform shell has a narrow aperture that is nearly half the length of the shell. The protoconch consists of two whorls. But only in a few species the sculpture of the protoconch is coarsely diagonally reticulate. The shell structure is reticulate with glossy nodules on the intersections of the ribs and lirae. The siphonal canal is short and wide. The U-shaped or linguiform anal sinus is deep, located near the suture and is surrounded by a thick outer lip. The outer lip is denticulate within. The columella is smooth.

== Distribution ==
This marine genus is widely distributed in the Indo Pacific, from the Red Sea to Easter Island; off Queensland, Australia

== Species ==
Species within the genus Kermia include:

- Kermia aegyptiaca Kilburn & Dekker, 2008
- Kermia aglaia (Melvill, 1904)
- Kermia albicaudata (Smith E. A., 1882)
- Kermia albifuniculata (Reeve, 1846)
- Kermia alveolata (Dautzenberg, 1912)
- Kermia aniani Kay, 1979
- Kermia apicalis (Montrouzier in Souverbie, 1861)
- Kermia benhami Oliver, 1915
- Kermia bifasciata (Pease, 1860)
- Kermia brunnea (Pease, 1860)
- † Kermia bulbosa Harzhauser, 2014
- Kermia caletria (Melvill & Standen, 1896)
- Kermia canistra (Hedley, 1922)
- Kermia catharia (Melvill, 1917)
- Kermia cavernosa (Reeve, 1845)
- Kermia chichijimana (Pilsbry, 1904)
- Kermia clathurelloides Kilburn, 2009
- Kermia crassula Rehder, 1980
- Kermia cylindrica (Pease, 1860)
- Kermia daedalea (Garrett, 1873)
- Kermia drupelloides Kilburn, 2009
- Kermia episema (Melvill & Standen, 1896)
- Kermia eugenei Kilburn, 2009
- Kermia euryacme (Melvill, 1927)
- Kermia euzonata (Hervier, 1897)
- Kermia felina (Reeve, 1843)
- Kermia geraldsmithi Kilburn, 2009
- Kermia granosa (Dunker, 1871)
- Kermia harenula (Hedley, 1922)
- Kermia informa McLean & Poorman, 1971
- Kermia irretita (Hedley, 1899)
- Kermia lutea (Pease, 1860)
- Kermia maculosa (Pease, 1863)
- Kermia margaritifera (Reeve, 1846)
- Kermia melanoxytum (Hervier, 1896)
- Kermia netrodes Melvill, 1917
- Kermia producta (Pease, 1860)
- Kermia pumila (Mighels, 1845)
- Kermia punctifera (Garrett, 1873)
- Kermia pustulosum (Folin, 1867)
- Kermia sagenaria Rehder, 1980
- Kermia spanionema Melvill, 1917
- Kermia subcylindrica (Hervier, 1897)
- Kermia tessellata (Hinds, 1843)
- Kermia thespesia (Melvill & Standen, 1896)
- Kermia thorssoni Chang, 2001
- Kermia tippetti Chang, 2001
- Kermia tokyoensis (Pilsbry, 1895)

Species brought into synonymy

- Kermia anxia Hedley, 1909 : synonym of Exomilus edychrous (Hervier, 1897)
- Kermia barnardi (Brazier, 1876): synonym of Pseudodaphnella barnardi (Brazier, 1876)
- Kermia chrysolitha (Melvill & Standen, 1896): synonym of Kermia punctifera (Garrett, 1873)
- Kermia clandestina Deshayes, 1863: synonym of Kermia pumila clandestina (Deshayes, 1863)
- Kermia edychroa (Hervier, 1897): synonym of Exomilus edychrous (Hervier, 1897)
- Kermia gracilis de Folin, 1879 : synonym of Exomilus edychrous (Hervier, 1897)
- Kermia hirsuta (de Folin, 1867): synonym of Microdaphne trichodes (Dall, 1919)
- Kermia margaritifera Reeve, 1846: synonym of Kermia foraminata (Reeve, 1845)
- Kermia mauritiana Sowerby, 1893: synonym of Kermia producta (Pease, 1860)
- Kermia oligoina Hedley, 1922: synonym of Pseudodaphnella oligoina Hedley, 1922
- Kermia picta Dunker, 1871: synonym of Philbertia felina (Reeve, 1843)
- Kermia pyrgodea (Melvill, 1917): synonym of Kermia producta (Pease, 1860)
- Kermia receptoria (Melvill & Standen, 1901): synonym of Daphnella receptoria Melvill & Standen, 1901
- Kermia rufolirata (Hervier, 1897): synonym of Pseudodaphnella rufolirata (Hervier, 1897)
- Kermia semilineata Garrett, 1873 : synonym of Kermia granosa (Dunker, 1871)
- Kermia spelaeodea (Hervier, 1897): synonym of Pseudodaphnella infrasulcata (Garrett, 1873)
- Kermia subspurca (Hervier, 1896): synonym of Hemilienardia subspurca (Hervier, 1896)
- Kermia thereganum Melvill & Standen, 1896: synonym of Kermia lutea (Pease, 1860)
- Kermia violacea Pease, W.H., 1868 : synonym of Kermia pumila (Mighels, 1845)

Species that are nomem dubium

- Kermia foraminata (Reeve, 1845)
