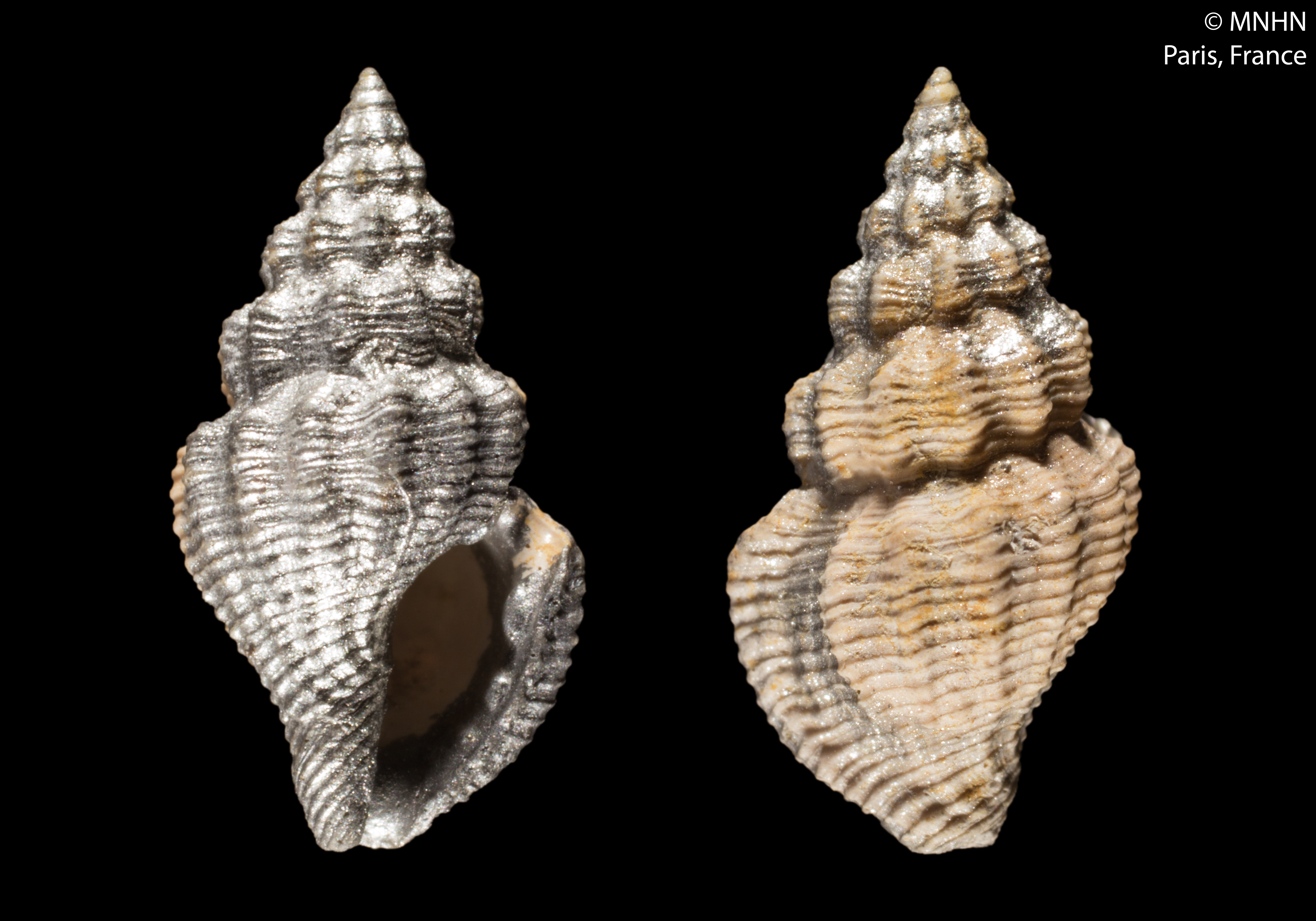
- Pleurotomoides lienardioides

Scientific classification
- Kingdom: Animalia
- Phylum: Mollusca
- Class: Gastropoda
- Subclass: Caenogastropoda
- Order: Neogastropoda
- Superfamily: Conoidea
- Family: Clathurellidae
- Genus: Pleurotomoides; Bronn, 1831

Type species
- † Defrancia pagoda Millet, 1827

Synonyms
- Bellardiella P. Fischer, 1883 (invalid: junior homonym of...); Bellatula Strand, 1929; Comarmondia Monterosato, 1884 junior subjective synonym; Daphnella (Bellardiella) P. Fischer, 1883; Defrancia Millet, 1827 (Invalid: junior homonym of Defrancia Bronn, 1825 [Bryozoa]; Pleurotomoides is a replacement name); Lora Gistel, 1848 (unnecessary replacement name for Defrancia Millet, 1827 non Bronn, 1825); Mangilia (Bellardiella) P. Fischer, 1883; Peratotoma (Bellardiella) P. Fischer, 1883; Pleurotoma (Bellardia) Bucquoy, Dautzenberg & Dollfus, 1883; Pleurotoma (Defrancia) Millet, 1827; † Pleurotoma (Pleurotomoides) Bronn, 1831 (original rank); Pleurotomoides (Pleurotomoides) Bronn, 1831 ·

= Pleurotomoides =

Genus of sea snails

Pleurotomoides is a genus of gastropods belonging to the family Clathurellidae.

The genus has almost cosmopolitan distribution.

== Species ==
- Pleurotomoides aequatorialis (Thiele, 1925)
- Pleurotomoides aethiopica (Thiele, 1925)
- Pleurotomoides barnardi Landau, Van Dingenen & Ceulemans, 2020
- † Pleurotomoides fascinellus (Dujardin, 1837)
- † Pleurotomoides fuschi (Bellardi, 1877)
- † Pleurotomoides gemmatus Lozouet, 2017
- Pleurotomoides gracilis (Montagu, 1803)
- † Pleurotomoides hordeaceus (Millet, 1827)
- Pleurotomoides infelix (Thiele, 1925)
- † Pleurotomoides isabelae Landau, Harzhauser, İslamoğlu & C. M. Silva, 2013
- † Pleurotomoides lapicidinae Lozouet, 2017
- †Pleurotomoides lienardioides Lozouet, 1999
- † Pleurotomoides littoralis Vera-Peláez, 2002
- Pleurotomoides lyciaca (Reeve, 1844) (nomen dubium)
- † Pleurotomoides milletii (Millet, 1827)
- †Pleurotomoides pagoda (Millet, 1827)
- Pleurotomoides pamina (Thiele, 1925)
- Pleurotomoides paulula (Thiele, 1925)
- Pleurotomoides petiti Dautzenberg, 1932
- † Pleurotomoides poustagnacensis Lozouet, 2017
- † Pleurotomoides pouweri Landau, Harzhauser, İslamoǧlu & Silva, 2013
- † Pleurotomoides pyrenaicus (Peyrot, 1931)
- † Pleurotomoides ringens (Bellardi, 1847)
- † Pleurotomoides robbai (Della Bella & Scarponi, 2007)
- † Pleurotomoides rupina Lozouet, 2017
- Pleurotomoides salaamensis (Thiele, 1925)
- † Pleurotomoides scalaria (De Cristofori & Jan, 1832)
- † Pleurotomoides serventii (Pelosio, 1967)
- † Pleurotomoides strombillus (Dujardin, 1837)
- Pleurotomoides suahelica (Thiele, 1925)
- † Pleurotomoides sublaevigatus (Grateloup, 1845)
- Pleurotomoides suleica (Thiele, 1925)
- Pleurotomoides sultana (Thiele, 1925)
- † Pleurotomoides suturalis (Millet, 1827)
- Pleurotomoides ulla (Thiele, 1925)
- Pleurotomoides vana (Thiele, 1925)
- † Pleurotomoides vanderdoncki Landau, Van Dingenen & Ceulemans, 2020
- † Pleurotomoides variabilis (Millet, 1827)

Synonyms

- Pleurotomoides decaryi Dautzenberg, 1932: synonym of Tylotiella decaryi (Dautzenberg, 1932) (original combination)
- Pleurotomoides gemmata Lozouet, 2017 †: synonym of Pleurotomoides gemmatus Lozouet, 2017 † (wrong gender agreement of specific epithet)
- Pleurotomoides imperati (Scacchi, 1835) †: synonym of Aphanitoma imperati (Scacchi, 1835) †
- Pleurotomoides maculosa (Pease, 1863): synonym of Kermia maculosa (Pease, 1863)
- Pleurotomoides obliquispira F. Nordsieck, 1977: synonym of Coralliophila meyendorffii (Calcara, 1845)
- Pleurotomoides punctifera (Garrett, 1873): synonym of Kermia punctifera (Garrett, 1873): synonym of Pseudodaphnella punctifera (Garrett, 1873)
- Pleurotomoides pyrenaica (Peyrot, 1931) †: synonym of Pleurotomoides pyrenaicus (Peyrot, 1931) † (wrong gender agreement of specific epithet)
- Pleurotomoides subcostellatus (d'Orbigny, 1852) †: synonym of Pleurotomoides sublaevigatus (Grateloup, 1845) †
- Pleurotomoides tessellata (Hinds, 1843): synonym of Kermia tessellata (Hinds, 1843)
- Pleurotomoides thespesia (Melvill & Standen, 1896): synonym of Kermia thespesia (Melvill & Standen, 1896)
