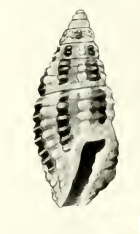
- Original image of a shell of Kermia chichijimana

Scientific classification
- Kingdom: Animalia
- Phylum: Mollusca
- Class: Gastropoda
- Subclass: Caenogastropoda
- Order: Neogastropoda
- Superfamily: Conoidea
- Family: Raphitomidae
- Genus: Kermia
- Species: K. chichijimana

Binomial name
- Kermia chichijimana (Pilsbry, 1904)

Synonyms
- Clathurella chichijimana Pilsbry, 1904

= Kermia chichijimana =

Species of gastropod

Kermia chichijimana is a species of sea snail, a marine gastropod mollusk in the family Raphitomidae.

This species is also considered a synonym of Pseudodaphnella barnardi (Brazier, 1876)

== Description ==
The length of the shell attains 4 mm, its diameter 1.7 mm.

(Original description) The small, solid shell has a fusiform shape. It is gray-white with five black-brown and the same number of white longitudinal stripes on the ribs, sometimes continuous, sometimes dislocated. The sculpture consists of 10 strong longitudinal ribs crossed by spiral threads which swell into tubercles on the ribs, and are 9 or 10 in number on the body whorl. The shell contains 7 whorls, the first 2½ yellow, rounded, forming a trochiform protoconch, sculptured with vertical riblets decussated by delicate, obliquely forward-descending striae. The junction of the protoconch and the sculptured shell is very oblique and sharply defined. The aperture is narrow, with a deep sinus above. The outer lip contains four small teeth within.

== Distribution ==
This marine species occurs off Japan.
