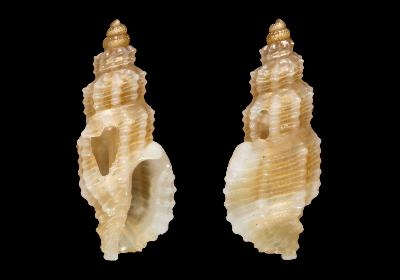
- Shells of Exomilus compressus

Scientific classification
- Kingdom: Animalia
- Phylum: Mollusca
- Class: Gastropoda
- Subclass: Caenogastropoda
- Order: Neogastropoda
- Superfamily: Conoidea
- Family: Raphitomidae
- Genus: Exomilus; Hedley, 1918

Type species
- Mangelia lutaria Hedley, 1907

Species
- See text

= Exomilus =

Genus of gastropods

Exomilus is a genus of sea snails, marine gastropod mollusks in the family Raphitomidae.

== Description ==
The small shell is, subcylindrical. It contains few whorls. The base is concave. The sculpture consists of radial ribs latticed by spiral cords. The outer lip is slightly thickened and denticulate within. The sinus is shallow and subsutural.

== Distribution ==
The species in this marine genus are endemic to Australia.

== Species ==
Species within the genus Exomilus include:

- Exomilus cancellatus (Beddome, 1883)
- Exomilus compressus Fedosov & Puillandre, 2012
- Exomilus cylindricus Laseron, 1954
- Exomilus dyscritos (Verco, 1906)
- Exomilus edychrous (Hervier, 1897)
- Exomilus lutarius (Hedley, 1907)
- Exomilus pentagonalis (Verco, 1896)
- Exomilus telescopialis (Verco, 1896)

Species brought into synonymy

- Exomilus anxius (Hedley, 1909): synonym of Exomilus edychrous (Hervier, 1897)
- Exomilus compressa Fedosov & Puillandre, 2012: synonym of Exomilus compressus Fedosov & Puillandre, 2012
- Exomilus fenestratus (Tate & May, 1900): synonym of Gatliffena fenestrata (Tate & May, 1900)
- Exomilus perangulata Hervier, 1897 : synonym of Mangelia orophoma Melvill & Standen, 1896
- Exomilus spica (Hedley, 1907): synonym of Exomilopsis spica (Hedley, 1907)
