= Daphnella compsa =

Scientific classification
- Kingdom: Animalia
- Phylum: Mollusca
- Class: Gastropoda
- Subclass: Caenogastropoda
- Order: Neogastropoda
- Superfamily: Conoidea
- Family: Raphitomidae
- Genus: Daphnella
- Species: D. compsa

Binomial name
- Daphnella compsa (Watson, 1881)

Synonyms
- Daphnella (Daphnella) compsa (Watson, 1881); Pleurotoma (Daphnella) compsa Watson, 1881

Species of gastropod

Daphnella compsa is a species of sea snail, a marine gastropod mollusk in the family Raphitomidae.

== Description ==
(Original description) The high, narrow, shell has a fusiform shape. It is white with pale irregular ruddy-brown spots near the suture and at the apex, which is small and sharp. The whorls are rounded and reticulately ribbed. The body whorl is narrow and drawn out on the base. It has a high subscalar spire. The aperture is long and rather narrow. The outer lip is thickened within and without, with a small sinus above and a distinct siphonal canal in front.

Sculpture. Longitudinals—on the earlier whorls there are sharp, narrow, prominent, slightly oblique, remote ribs. These increase in number and diminish in distinctness, till on the body whorl they are very numerous, crowded, and insignificant. This arises from intermediate riblets, which are almost invisible on the earlier whorls, reaching on the body whorl a prominence equal to that of the others. These are best seen in the sinus-area. Behind the lip is a strong and broad varix, scored with the riblets, and bevelled off to a thin prominent edge. Spirals—the whole surface is covered with fine sharp raised spirals, very often alternating with finer ones in the intervals. They are separated by shallow square furrows of about the same breadth as the spirals. At their intersections with the longitudinals they are slightly nodose. In the sinus-area there are only fine crowded spirals, whilst on the snout these are strong and remote.

The colour of the shell is dead porcellaneous white, with a few faint ruddy-brown blotches near the top of the whorls and toward the outer lip.

The spire is high, conical and scalar. The apex is small, sharp, conical, consisting of 3–4 ruddy rounded embryonic whorls, the sculpture of which is that of the typical Defrancia group (= Pleurotomoides), i. e. the upper half of the whorls is scored longitudinally by very numerous minute, sharp, raised, curved bars, which split into two and cover the lower half of the whorls with exquisite little square-shaped reticulations formed by the crossing of the bars. The shell contains 9–10 whorls in all, of regular, but rather rapid increase. They are at first rather broad, but the penultimate is high and the body whorl rather long and narrow. They rise in steps one above another, being a little flattened above, are well rounded, and have a slight contraction into the lower suture. The body whorl is produced into a very lop-sided, long, and somewhat oblique and obliquely truncated snout. The suture is strongly marked by the slight contraction of the whorl above, and a constriction of the shoulder of the whorl below, but is not really deep, for the inferior whorl laps up on that above it. The aperture is long, narrow, oblong, sharply pointed above, and produced into an open broadish spout-like siphonal canal below. The outer lip forms a regular flat curve to the siphonal canal, where it is slightly concave and then straight. At its junction with the body there is a strongly marked little rounded nick which cuts into the edge, but is bordered by a small encircling pad lying between it and the body whorl. This nick is the generic sinus, and the scars of it are marked on all the whorls. The extreme edge of the lip is thin and sharp, but there is a strongish white porcellaneous pad a little way within. This pad does not extend to the siphonal canal, the edge of which at the point is very obliquely cut off from right to left. The inner lip, as mentioned there is a small pad above formed by an extension of the outer lip. This is continued across the body as a porcellaneous layer, thinning out and disappearing on the columella, which is cut off in front with a long obliquity, whose edge is rounded, but hardly twisted.

== Distribution ==
This marine species occurs off the Fiji Islands
