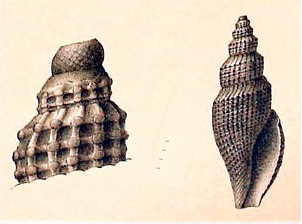
- Original image of a shell of Daphnella aulacoessa

Scientific classification
- Kingdom: Animalia
- Phylum: Mollusca
- Class: Gastropoda
- Subclass: Caenogastropoda
- Order: Neogastropoda
- Superfamily: Conoidea
- Family: Raphitomidae
- Genus: Daphnella
- Species: D. aulacoessa

Binomial name
- Daphnella aulacoessa (Watson, 1881)

Synonyms
- Daphnella (Daphnella) aulacoessa (Watson, 1881); Pleurotoma (Daphnella) aulacoessa Watson, 1881

= Daphnella aulacoessa =

Species of gastropod

Daphnella aulacoessa is a species of sea snail, a marine gastropod mollusk in the family Raphitomidae.

== Description ==
The high, narrow, white shell has a fusiform shape. The whorls are convexly cylindrical. The spire is high, narrow, subscalar, and conical. The body whorl is long, narrow, and conical, with a small snout. The outer lip has a thin crimped edge. The sinus is small, but very well defined at the extreme top of the long narrow aperture.

Sculpture: Longitudinals—there are on each whorl many (27 on penultimate, about 40 on the body whorl) fine, rounded, curved threads, which correspond with the old lines of growth. They are parted by minute furrows, which are rather narrower than the threads. These longitudinals extend to the base, but not to the snout. Spirals—the riblets are crossed by very similar spiral threads which form minute knots at the crossings, and these are parted by little furrows which are rather wider and less regular than the longitudinal ones, and have occasionally subsidiary threadlets in the middle. There are about 7 of these spirals on the penultimate and about 14 on the body whorl. The sinus-area has very faint threadlets, about three in number, and the first regular spiral below these is stronger than all the rest, and forms a slight keel. They cover the whole snout.

The spire is high, conical and subscalar. The apex is small, sharp, consisting of three (probably, for the extreme tip is broken) embryonic whorls which have the typical Defrancia-sculpture (= Pleurotomoides), the upper third being straight barred and the lower two thirds reticulately barred. But the sculpture is very fine. The shell contains about 8 whorls in all, of regular but rapid increase. They are in form convexly conical, slightly shouldered above. The body whorl, which is narrow, is produced into a convexly conical base and a short oblique-ended snout. The suture is slightly impressed, and is somewhat strongly marked by the swelling of the whorl immediately below. The aperture is narrowly oblong, bluntly pointed above, where it runs out into the small but rather deeply impressed and rounded gutter of the sinus, and produced below into a broadish canal. The outer lip is regularly curved, but at the siphonal canal flattened. The edge forms a regularly curved sweep, prominent in the middle, and retreating into the sinus and siphonal canal. It is slightly contracted, sharp, crimped rather than toothed, thickened a little way within. In the sinus it is blunted and rounded into a gutter. An extension of the outer lip surrounds the sinus and forms a small pad between that and the body whorl. The inner lip shows a very thin glaze on the body and columella. The edge of the columella in front has a very slight oblique bend, and is sharply rounded, but scarce twisted.

== Distribution ==
This marine species is endemic to Australia and occurs off Queensland
