= K. lutea =

K. lutea may refer to:

- Kermia lutea, a sea snail
- Kotschya lutea, a legume with an aeschynomenoid root nodule
