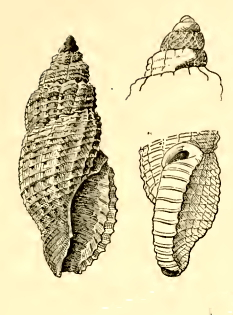
- Original image of a shell of Kermia irretita

Scientific classification
- Kingdom: Animalia
- Phylum: Mollusca
- Class: Gastropoda
- Subclass: Caenogastropoda
- Order: Neogastropoda
- Superfamily: Conoidea
- Family: Raphitomidae
- Genus: Kermia
- Species: K. irretita

Binomial name
- Kermia irretita (Hedley, 1899)

Synonyms
- Clathurella irretita Hedley, 1899 (original combination)

= Kermia irretita =

Species of gastropod

Kermia irretita is a species of sea snail, a marine gastropod mollusk in the family Raphitomidae.

== Description ==
The length of the shell attains 5 mm, its diameter 2 mm.

(Original description) The narrow shell has an ovate-fusiform shape. It is turreted and sharply angled below a sloping shoulder. Its colour is white, from the suture to the angle opaque, below the angle hyaline with opaque beads. The protoconch is buff yellow, a splash of the same on the anterior dorsal portion of the body whorl, a pale yellow thread, confined to one spiral cord, ascends each whorl below the angle, and another surrounds the body whorl below the periphery.

The adult contains 4½ whorls. The body whorl bears fifteen longitudinal costae which cross the flattened part of the whorl obliquely, where they are separated by twice their breadth. Above the angle they bend and enlarge suddenly. Towards the base they curve in and vanish at the basal constriction. On the penultimate whorl these costae alternate with those below the suture. These longitudinal costae are over-ridden by a series of fine sharp spiral cords knotted at each costa. The body whorl carries four larger and more undulating ones above the angle and ten below it. On the base are six simple cords. The protoconch is horny, mamillate, three and a half whorled, the larger sculptured with a raised network, contrasting sharply by colour and texture with the adult shell, which suddenly commences with a thick raised white tongue at the suture. The aperture is narrow and elliptical. The columella is arched, overlaid by a callus which ends abruptly where the aperture narrows. The siphonal canal is short and wide. The outer lip is massive, ridged externally by a dozen transverse cords which denticulate the edges. Within are seven weak entering ridges. The aperture mounts the preceding whorl to the height of two spiral cords, and encloses a deep wide anal notch with a prominent callus.

== Distribution ==
This marine species occurs off Tuvalu.
