= Kermia drupelloides =

Scientific classification
- Kingdom: Animalia
- Phylum: Mollusca
- Class: Gastropoda
- Subclass: Caenogastropoda
- Order: Neogastropoda
- Superfamily: Conoidea
- Family: Raphitomidae
- Genus: Kermia
- Species: K. drupelloides

Binomial name
- Kermia drupelloides Kilburn, 2009

Species of gastropod

Kermia drupelloides is a species of sea snail, a marine gastropod mollusk in the family Raphitomidae.

== Description ==
The length of the shell varies between 4 mm and 6.5 mm.

== Distribution ==
This marine species occurs off KwaZulu-Natal, South Africa
