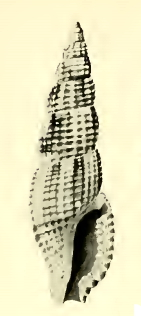
- Original image of a shell of Kermia canistra

Scientific classification
- Kingdom: Animalia
- Phylum: Mollusca
- Class: Gastropoda
- Subclass: Caenogastropoda
- Order: Neogastropoda
- Superfamily: Conoidea
- Family: Raphitomidae
- Genus: Kermia
- Species: K. canistra

Binomial name
- Kermia canistra (Hedley, 1922)

Synonyms
- Pseudodaphnella canistra Hedley, 1922

= Kermia canistra =

Species of gastropod

Kermia canistra is a species of sea snail, a marine gastropod mollusk in the family Raphitomidae.

== Description ==
The length of the shell attains 12 mm.

(Original description) The subulate shell is rather solid. The adult shell contains seven whorls. Its colour is irregularly disposed; on a ground of buff are broad white vertical stripes, a few narrow distant chestnut stripes, and a narrow white peripheral belt. The sculpture consists of eighteen spiral cords and twenty-two radial riblets. Within the outer lip are ten small and short plications.

== Distribution ==
This marine species occurs from the Gulf of Carpentaria to Queensland, Australia; also off the Philippines
