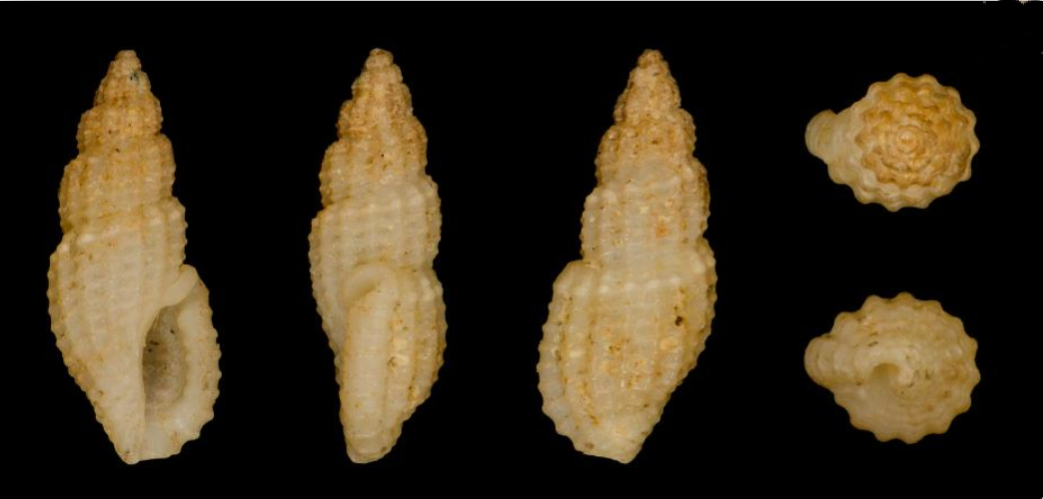
- Shell and protoconch of Kermia sagenaria (holotype at the Smithsonian Institution)

Scientific classification
- Kingdom: Animalia
- Phylum: Mollusca
- Class: Gastropoda
- Subclass: Caenogastropoda
- Order: Neogastropoda
- Superfamily: Conoidea
- Family: Raphitomidae
- Genus: Kermia
- Species: K. sagenaria

Binomial name
- Kermia sagenaria Rehder, 1980

= Kermia sagenaria =

Species of gastropod

Kermia sagenaria is a species of sea snail, a marine gastropod mollusk in the family Raphitomidae.

== Description ==
The length of the shell varies between 5.5 mm and 8 mm.

== Distribution ==
This marine species occurs off Easter Island, the Austral Islands and the Philippines.
