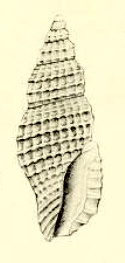
- Original image of a shell of Kermia benhami

Scientific classification
- Kingdom: Animalia
- Phylum: Mollusca
- Class: Gastropoda
- Subclass: Caenogastropoda
- Order: Neogastropoda
- Superfamily: Conoidea
- Family: Raphitomidae
- Genus: Kermia
- Species: K. benhami

Binomial name
- Kermia benhami Oliver, 1915

= Kermia benhami =

Species of gastropod

Kermia benhami is a species of sea snail, a marine gastropod mollusk in the family Raphitomidae.

== Description ==
The length of the shell attains 4 mm, its diameter 1.5 mm.

(Original description) The shell is fusiform. The body whorl measures more than half the length of the shell. The shell contains 6½ whorls. These are flatly rounded and with a deep suture. The aperture is narrow, slightly oblique, and sinuous. The outer lip is thick, slightly expanded and denticulate within. The sinus is deep and broad, near the suture, but surrounded by a thick lip. The inner lip is thin and narrow. The columella is smooth.

Sculpture : The 1st whorl of the protoconch is smooth, the 2nd crossed by threads which, beginning at the upper suture, pass first longitudinally and singly, then at the periphery bifurcate, each branch passing obliquely to the suture, thus reticulating the lower half. The adult whorls are entirely reticulated by axial ribs, about 8 on the first whorl and 20 on the body whorl, overridden by less prominent and narrower spiral ribs, forming transverse beads at the intersections. There are 2 spirals on the first adult whorl, 5 on the penultimate (of which the two upper are smaller than the others), and 13 on the body whorl counting just behind the outer lip. Of these, the two upper are less prominent than the others. The interstices are deep, between the spirals 2 to 3 times the width of the latter, and between the axials about 1½ times the width of the ribs. At the anterior end of the body whorl the spirals are more prominent than the axials. The transverse ribs of the body whorl extend over the expanded outer lip. Under the microscope the whole surface is seen to be finely spirally striated.

Colour : The protoconch is light brown, the remainder of shell uniformly dark brown. The outer lip shows a white patch at the sinus and another near the centre. The inner lip and the interior of the aperture is pale brown.

== Distribution ==
This marine species occurs off Kermadec Island and Easter Island.
