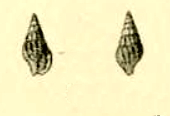
- Original image of a shell of Kermia tokyoensis

Scientific classification
- Kingdom: Animalia
- Phylum: Mollusca
- Class: Gastropoda
- Subclass: Caenogastropoda
- Order: Neogastropoda
- Superfamily: Conoidea
- Family: Raphitomidae
- Genus: Kermia
- Species: K. tokyoensis

Binomial name
- Kermia tokyoensis Chang, 2001

Synonyms
- Drillia tokyoensis Pilsbry, 1895 (original combination); Philbertia tokyoensis (Pilsbry, 1895)

= Kermia tokyoensis =

Species of gastropod

Kermia tokyoensis is a species of sea snail, a marine gastropod mollusk in the family Raphitomidae.

== Description ==
The length of the shell attains 7 mm, its diameter 2.5 mm.

(Original description) The fusiform, elongated, slender shell is dark chestnut-brown throughout. It contains six whorls, slightly convex, separated by narrowly impressed sutures. The earlier two whorls are smooth, the remainder strongly latticed. There are 15 spirals on the body whorl, strong, equal and continuous. The longitudinal ribs number 22 on the body whorl, about as high as the spiral cords, but wider and more rounded, disappearing on the very short siphonal canal. The penultimate whorl contains 6 spiral cords. The aperture measures three-sevenths the total altitude of the shell. The outer lip is thickened by a rounded varix and is within crenulated by short lirae. The anal notch is deep, narrow and rounded, separated from the suture by a heavy callus. The siphonal canal is short and straight.

== Distribution ==
This marine species was found off Tokyo harbour, Japan.
