= Kermia tippetti =

Scientific classification
- Kingdom: Animalia
- Phylum: Mollusca
- Class: Gastropoda
- Subclass: Caenogastropoda
- Order: Neogastropoda
- Superfamily: Conoidea
- Family: Raphitomidae
- Genus: Kermia
- Species: K. tippetti

Binomial name
- Kermia tippetti Chang, 2001

Synonyms
- Raphitoma tippetti (Chang, 2001)

Species of gastropod

Kermia tippetti is a species of sea snail, a marine gastropod mollusk in the family Raphitomidae.

== Distribution ==
This marine species occurs off Taiwan
