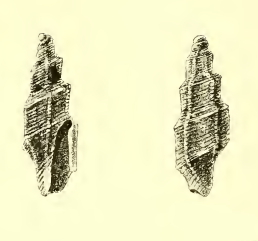
- Original image of a shell of Exomilus pentagonalis

Scientific classification
- Kingdom: Animalia
- Phylum: Mollusca
- Class: Gastropoda
- Subclass: Caenogastropoda
- Order: Neogastropoda
- Superfamily: Conoidea
- Family: Raphitomidae
- Genus: Exomilus
- Species: E. pentagonalis

Binomial name
- Exomilus pentagonalis (Verco, 1896)

Synonyms
- Drillia pentagonalis Verco, 1896

= Exomilus pentagonalis =

Species of gastropod

Exomilus pentagonalis, common name the orange rib drillia, is a species of sea snail, a marine gastropod mollusk in the family Raphitomidae.

== Description ==
The length of the shell attains 3.5 mm, its diameter 1.25 mm.

(Original description) The minute shell is telescope-shaped and rather thick. It contains 4 1/2 whorls without the protoconch. The protoconch is absent. The spire is gradated, the whorls straight-sided in the anterior three-fourths, and bevelled at an angle of 45° to the posterior suture, which is distinct and simple. The sculpture consists of five longitudinal ribs, continuous, narrow, erect and prominent. The interspaces are nearly flat, giving a pentagonal section. The spiral sculpture consists of Sublenticular inconspicuous longitudinal and spiral striae, which cross the ribs. The body whorl shows five longitudinal ribs, squarely rhomboidal, angulated near the suture, and carinated at the periphery, the ribs having projecting points here, and the carina being curved between them. The body whorl is excavately contracted below. Scarcely visible sublenticular longitudinal striae in upper part; rather less obsolete spiral striae. These are more valid below the carina, where seven can be counted on the ventral aspect. The aperture is narrow, elongately oblong. The outer lip is varicosely thickened by a rib. The margin is thin, simple, and sharp, straight for four-sevenths of its length, between the angle and the carina, curved towards the notch in the lower two-sevenths, and containing a well marked sinus in the upper seventh, rather more than a semi-circle, not quite reaching to the suture. The columella is straight, slightly concave below. The inner lip is inconspicuous. Ornament unicoloured dull stony-white.

== Distribution ==
This marine species is endemic to Australia and occurs off New South Wales, South Australia and Tasmania.
