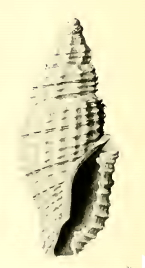
- Original image of a shell of Kermia harenula

Scientific classification
- Kingdom: Animalia
- Phylum: Mollusca
- Class: Gastropoda
- Subclass: Caenogastropoda
- Order: Neogastropoda
- Superfamily: Conoidea
- Family: Raphitomidae
- Genus: Kermia
- Species: K. harenula

Binomial name
- Kermia harenula (Hedley, 1922)

Synonyms
- Pseudodaphnella harenula Hedley, 1922

= Kermia harenula =

Species of gastropod

Kermia harenula is a species of sea snail, a marine gastropod mollusk in the family Raphitomidae.

== Description ==
The length of the shell attains 4 mm, its diameter 1.7 mm.

(Original description) The small, solid shell is ovate-fusiform, rather turreted and constricted at the base. Its colour is white, the protoconch buff. On the upper whorls an orange line runs along the second spiral below the angle. On the body whorl such lines follow the third, seventh, and tenth spirals. On the back of the body whorl there may be an irregular orange blotch. The shell contains seven whorls, of which 3½ compose the protoconch.

Sculpture: A subsutural space representing the fasciole is smooth save for radial wrinkles. The radial ribs are perpendicular and discontinuous, absent on base and fasciole, set at about fourteen to a whorl, and chiefly discernible as knots on the spirals. On the body whorl the spirals amount to fifteen, on the penultimate to six, and on the antepenultimate to four sharp elevated cords.

Aperture :—The varix is moderately prominent, and mounts considerably on the penultimate. The inner edge of the outer lip is beset with ten small crowded denticules. The sinus is spout shaped, constricted at its entrance. The columella terminates anteriorly, and within is a small but distinct tooth.

== Distribution ==
This marine species occurs in the Gulf of Carpentaria to Queensland, Australia
