= Kermia cylindrica =

Scientific classification
- Kingdom: Animalia
- Phylum: Mollusca
- Class: Gastropoda
- Subclass: Caenogastropoda
- Order: Neogastropoda
- Superfamily: Conoidea
- Family: Raphitomidae
- Genus: Kermia
- Species: K. cylindrica

Binomial name
- Kermia cylindrica (Pease, 1860)

Synonyms
- Clathurella cylindrica Pease, 1860

Species of gastropod

Kermia cylindrica is a species of sea snail, a marine gastropod mollusk in the family Raphitomidae.

== Description ==
The length of the shell attains 4 mm.

(Original description) The cylindrically fusiform shell is shining. The apex is very blunt. The shell is very longitudinally strongly ribbed and very transversely ornamented with raised striae, forming deep cancellations. The whorls are very slightly convex and angulated at the sutures. The aperture is very oval. The colour of the shell is very white.

== Distribution ==
This species occurs in the Pacific Ocean off Hawaii and the Tuamotus.
