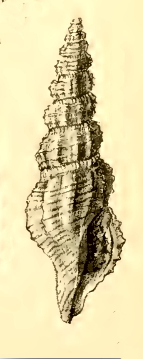
- Original image of a shell of Kermia netrodes

Scientific classification
- Kingdom: Animalia
- Phylum: Mollusca
- Class: Gastropoda
- Subclass: Caenogastropoda
- Order: Neogastropoda
- Superfamily: Conoidea
- Family: Raphitomidae
- Genus: Kermia
- Species: K. netrodes

Binomial name
- Kermia netrodes (Melvill, 1917)

Synonyms
- Clathurina netrodes Melvill, 1917

= Kermia netrodes =

Species of gastropod

Kermia netrodes is a species of sea snail, a marine gastropod mollusk in the family Raphitomidae.

== Description ==
The length of the shell attains 12 mm, its diameter 3.5 mm.

The long shell has an attenuate shape. It is straw-colored to brown colored with sparse brownish spiral beneath the sutures and below the periphery at the base of the shell. It contains 10 whorls of which 3 in the protoconch. The second and the third whorl are cancellate. The subsequent whorls contains few, rounded ribs, crossed everywhere by 3 - 4 rough, spiral lirae; nine ribs and in the body whorl. The ovate-shaped aperture is narrow. The sinus is not deep. The outer lip is slightly incrassate. The columella is rather straight. The siphonal canal is not produced.

== Distribution ==
This marine species occurs in the Persian Gulf.
