= Kermia thorssoni =

Scientific classification
- Kingdom: Animalia
- Phylum: Mollusca
- Class: Gastropoda
- Subclass: Caenogastropoda
- Order: Neogastropoda
- Superfamily: Conoidea
- Family: Raphitomidae
- Genus: Kermia
- Species: K. thorssoni

Binomial name
- Kermia thorssoni Chang, 2001

Species of gastropod

Kermia thorssoni is a species of sea snail, a marine gastropod mollusk in the family Raphitomidae.

== Description ==
The length of the shell varies between 4 mm and 8 mm.

== Distribution ==
This mùarine species occurs off Taiwan and the Philippines.
