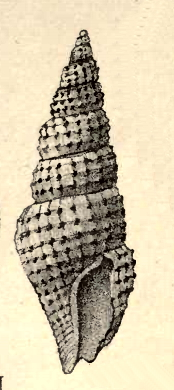
- Shell of Kermia pustulosum

Scientific classification
- Kingdom: Animalia
- Phylum: Mollusca
- Class: Gastropoda
- Subclass: Caenogastropoda
- Order: Neogastropoda
- Superfamily: Conoidea
- Family: Raphitomidae
- Genus: Kermia
- Species: K. pustulosum

Binomial name
- Kermia pustulosum (Folin, 1867)

Synonyms
- Clathurella pustulosa (Folin, 1867); Pleurotoma pustulosum Folin, 1867

= Kermia pustulosum =

Species of gastropod

Kermia pustulosum is a species of sea snail, a marine gastropod mollusk in the family Raphitomidae.

== Description ==
The length of the shell varies between 4 mm and 8 mm.

The color of the shell is light fulvous, the pustules tipped with red.

== Distribution ==
This marine species occurs off Taiwan and Fiji.
