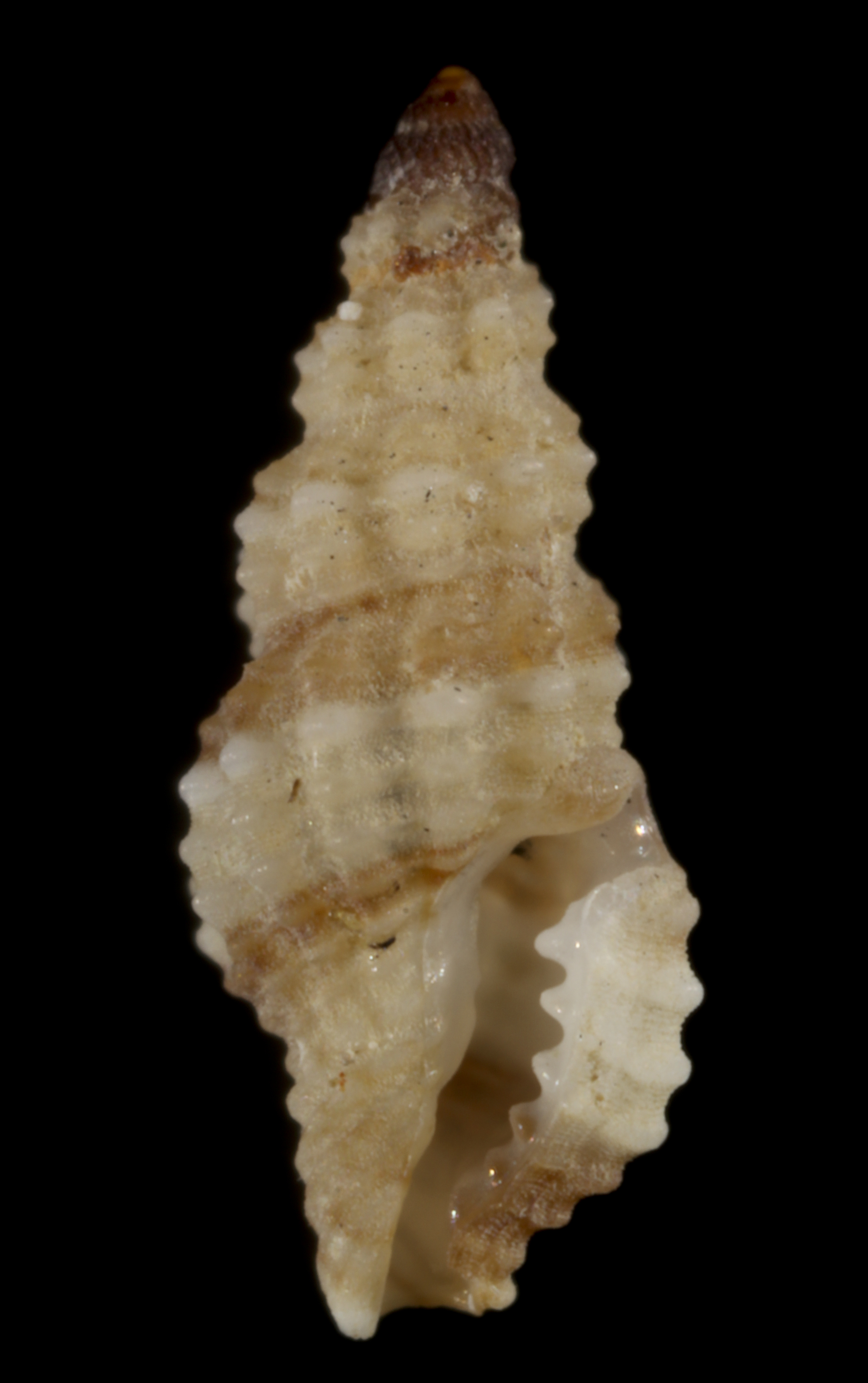
- Shell of Kermia melanoxytum (specimen at MNHN, Paris)

Scientific classification
- Kingdom: Animalia
- Phylum: Mollusca
- Class: Gastropoda
- Subclass: Caenogastropoda
- Order: Neogastropoda
- Superfamily: Conoidea
- Family: Raphitomidae
- Genus: Kermia
- Species: K. melanoxytum

Binomial name
- Kermia melanoxytum (Hervier, 1896)

Synonyms
- Defrancia melanoxytum (Hervier, 1896); Glyphostoma melanoxytum Hervier, 1896 (original combination); Lienardia melanoxytum (Hervier, 1896)

= Kermia melanoxytum =

Species of gastropod

Kermia melanoxytum is a species of sea snail, a marine gastropod mollusk in the family Raphitomidae.

== Description ==
The length of the shell varies between 4 mm and 5 mm; its diameter reaches a max of 2 mm.

== Distribution ==
This marine species occurs off the Loyalty Islands, New Caledonia; Vanuatu, the Philippines, Hawaii, and South Africa.
