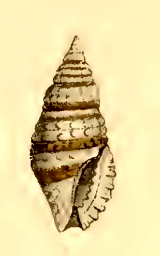
- Original image of a shell of Kermia euzonata

Scientific classification
- Kingdom: Animalia
- Phylum: Mollusca
- Class: Gastropoda
- Subclass: Caenogastropoda
- Order: Neogastropoda
- Superfamily: Conoidea
- Family: Raphitomidae
- Genus: Kermia
- Species: K. euzonata

Binomial name
- Kermia euzonata (Hervier, 1897)

Synonyms
- Clathurella euzonata Hervier, 1897

= Kermia euzonata =

Species of gastropod

Kermia euzonata is a species of sea snail, a marine gastropod mollusk in the family Raphitomidae.

== Description ==
The length of the shell varies between 6 mm and 6.5 mm, its diameter between 2.25 mm and 2.5 mm.

The oblong, quite thick shell has a fusiform shape.

The bright white shell is adorned on the upper whorls with two beautiful yellow bands: the first one is lighter, located a little below the suture, the second is darker and wider at the bottom of the whorls, disappearing under the lower suture. In the body whorl, a third band, more extended, is located a little below the top of the aperture, separated from the second by an interval of two decurrent cords. Yellow colors sometimes can be found through intermediate lines or diffuse tones that makes the shell less white. Sometimes also the upper band disappears to show than the lower one.

The slender spire contains counts 7 to 8 whorls. The first two, embryonic, are rounded, smooth and deep yellow. The subsequent whorls are slightly rounded and impressed at both sutures. They contain longitudinal rounded ribs, quite high, leaving between them an interval roughly equal to their diameter in the higher whorls, and joined at the body whorl (where we count 14), towards the beginning of the siphonal canal. Regular, spiral, fairly high cordlets (4 on the penultimate whorl - the original Latin text mistakenly mentioned 5), overcome the costulations by forming small nodules. They form on the shell a deep reticulation whose intervals of the meshes are furrowed very finely, in height, with lines of growth. The base of the shell, rather strongly thickened, after a slight depression of the body whorl below the middle, is surrounded by seven oblique, granular, very strong cords and ends with a very short, inverted, widening siphonal canal. This basal part of the shell is remarkably white, crossing the yellow coloring of the bands that dominate it. The semi-oval aperture is white within. The columella is straight and smooth. The periphery is arched, briefly depressed at the beginning of the siphonal canal, is thickened on the last rib which is usually white. The outer lip is crenellated and the inside is crisscrossed with six strong folds. The rounded subsutural sinus opens quite widely in the thick part of the outer lip between the first and the third cord.

== Distribution ==
This marine species occurs off the Loyalty Islands, New Caledonia and Hawaii.
