= Kermia producta =

Scientific classification
- Kingdom: Animalia
- Phylum: Mollusca
- Class: Gastropoda
- Subclass: Caenogastropoda
- Order: Neogastropoda
- Superfamily: Conoidea
- Family: Raphitomidae
- Genus: Kermia
- Species: K. producta

Binomial name
- Kermia producta (Pease, 1860)

Synonyms
- Clathurella producta Pease, 1860; Clathurina foraminata var. pyrgodea Melvill, 1917; Clathurina pyrgodea Melvill, 1917; Defrancia mauritiana G. B. Sowerby III, 1893; Kermia pyrgodea (Melvill, 1917); Philbertia producta (Pease, 1860)

Species of gastropod

Kermia producta is a species of sea snail, a marine gastropod mollusk in the family Raphitomidae.

== Description ==
The length of the shell varies between 4 mm and 17 mm.

(Original description) The fusiformly elongate shell is longitudinally ribbed and finely striated transversely. The whorls are convex. The suture is impressed. The aperture is oval. The outer lip is denticulated. The siphonal canal is short. The colour of the shell is yellowish-brown. A darker band of the same colour appears on each whorl.

== Distribution ==
This marine species occurs off Fiji, French Polynesia, Hawaii; also off South Africa
