= Kermia crassula =

Scientific classification
- Kingdom: Animalia
- Phylum: Mollusca
- Class: Gastropoda
- Subclass: Caenogastropoda
- Order: Neogastropoda
- Superfamily: Conoidea
- Family: Raphitomidae
- Genus: Kermia
- Species: K. crassula

Binomial name
- Kermia crassula Rehder, 1980

Species of gastropod

Kermia crassula is a species of sea snail, a marine gastropod mollusk in the family Raphitomidae.

== Description ==
The length of the shell varies between 2.4 mm and 3.1 mm.

== Distribution ==
This marine species occurs off Easter Island.
