= Kermia granosa =

Scientific classification
- Kingdom: Animalia
- Phylum: Mollusca
- Class: Gastropoda
- Subclass: Caenogastropoda
- Order: Neogastropoda
- Superfamily: Conoidea
- Family: Raphitomidae
- Genus: Kermia
- Species: K. granosa

Binomial name
- Kermia granosa (Dunker, 1871)

Synonyms
- Clathurella granosa Dunker, 1871; Clathurella semilineata (Dunker, 1871).; Defrancia granosa (Dunker, 1871); Glyphostoma granosa (Dunker, 1871).; Kermia semilineata Garrett, 1873; Lienardia (Acrista) granosa (Dunker, 1871); Pseudodaphnella granosa (Dunker 1871)

Species of gastropod

Kermia granosa is a species of sea snail, a marine gastropod mollusk in the family Raphitomidae.

== Description ==
The length of the shell attains 6 mm.

The color of the shell is cinereous, with four or five revolving brown lines on the upper whorls and three near the base. The shell contains twelve ribs, rather stout. Tnterstices show small transverse ridges, which form nodules on the ribs. The sinus is large, rounded. The peristome is 6-7 toothed within.

== Distribution ==
This marine species occurs widely in the Indo-West Pacific: off Taiwan; Tahiti; Samoa; Réunion; Queensland, Australia
