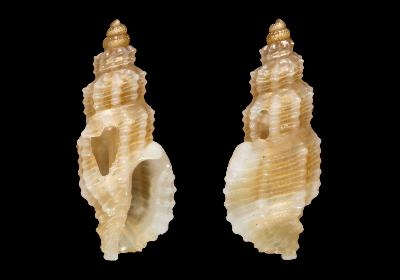
- Shell of Exomilus compressus (specimen at MNHN, Paris)

Scientific classification
- Kingdom: Animalia
- Phylum: Mollusca
- Class: Gastropoda
- Subclass: Caenogastropoda
- Order: Neogastropoda
- Superfamily: Conoidea
- Family: Raphitomidae
- Genus: Exomilus
- Species: E. compressus

Binomial name
- Exomilus compressus Fedosov & Puillandre, 2012

Synonyms
- Exomilus compressa Fedosov & Puillandre, 2012 (incorrect gender agreement of specific epithet)

= Exomilus compressus =

Species of gastropod

Exomilus compressus is a species of sea snail, a marine gastropod mollusk in the family Raphitomidae. This species is found in the Indo-Pacific region and is characterized by its slender, fusiform shell with distinct axial ribbing.

== Description ==
The length of the shell attains 3.2 mm.

== Distribution ==
This marine species is found off of Vanuatu, New Caledonia, and the Loyalty Islands.
