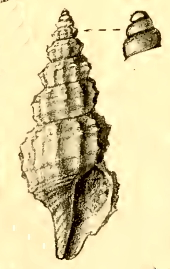
- Original image of a shell of Kermia spanionema

Scientific classification
- Kingdom: Animalia
- Phylum: Mollusca
- Class: Gastropoda
- Subclass: Caenogastropoda
- Order: Neogastropoda
- Superfamily: Conoidea
- Family: Raphitomidae
- Genus: Kermia
- Species: K. spanionema

Binomial name
- Kermia spanionema (Melvill, 1917)

Synonyms
- Clathurina spanionema Melvill, 1917

= Kermia spanionema =

Species of gastropod

Kermia spanionema is a species of sea snail, a marine gastropod mollusk in the family Raphitomidae.

== Description ==
The length of the shell attains 8 mm, its diameter 3 mm.

A small, delicate, white shell with a fusiform shape. It is eight-whorled of which three in the protoconch. The first two are globose and vitreous, the third apical being beautifully cancellate. The subsequent five whorls are impressed at the suture and longitudinally incrassate (12 on the body whorl). The spiral lirae are few, in the last whorl they are absent just in the centre. The aperture is ovate. The outer lip is thin. The sinus is not prominent. The siphonal canal is somewhat prolonged. The columella is straight.

== Distribution ==
This marine species occurs in the Gulf of Oman.
