= Kermia aegyptiaca =

Scientific classification
- Kingdom: Animalia
- Phylum: Mollusca
- Class: Gastropoda
- Subclass: Caenogastropoda
- Order: Neogastropoda
- Superfamily: Conoidea
- Family: Raphitomidae
- Genus: Kermia
- Species: K. aegyptiaca

Binomial name
- Kermia aegyptiaca Kilburn & Dekker, 2008

Species of gastropod

Kermia aegyptiaca is a species of sea snail, a marine gastropod mollusk in the family Raphitomidae.

== Description ==
The length of the shell attains 6 mm.

== Distribution ==
This species occurs in the Red Sea off Hurghada, Egypt.
