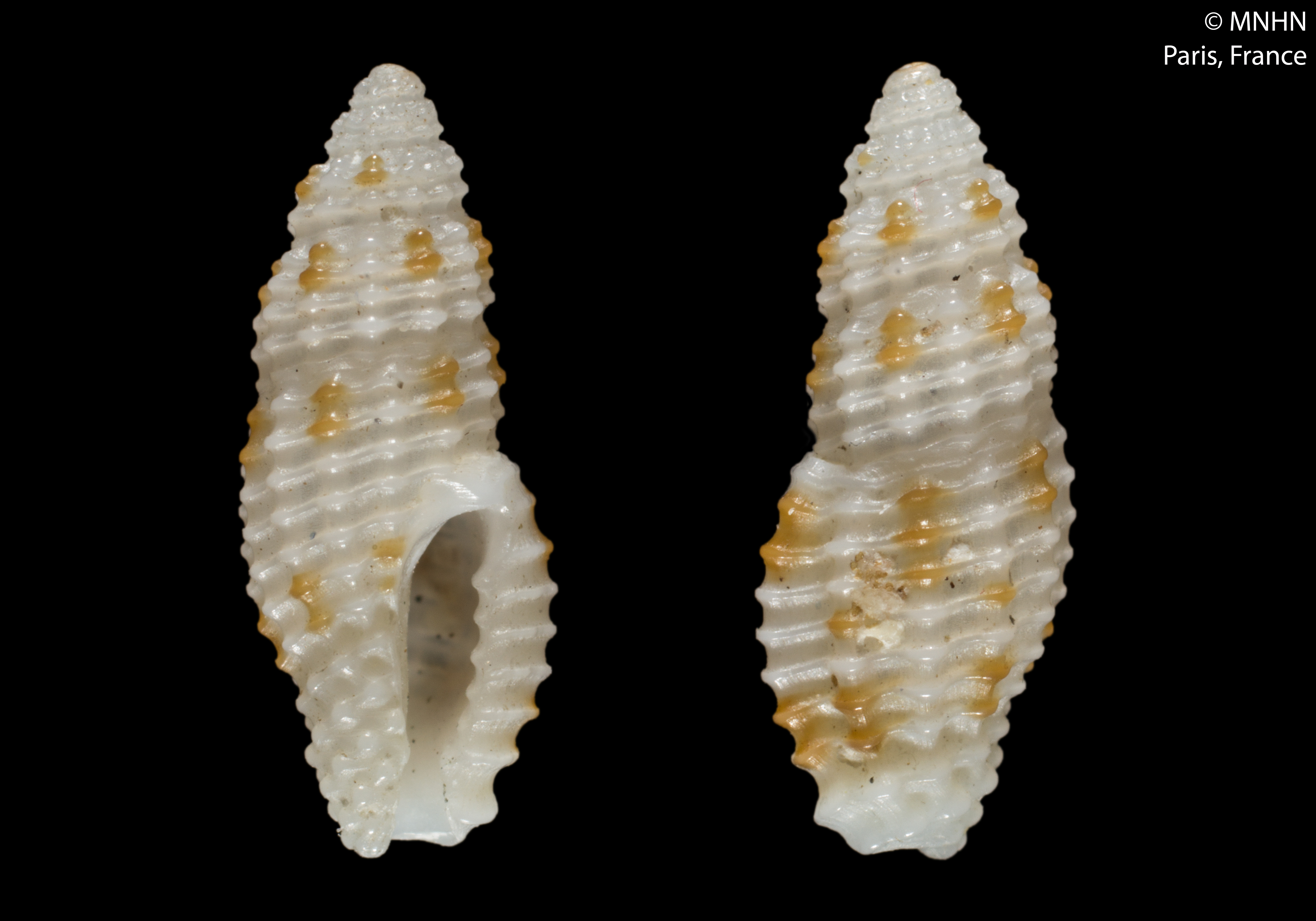
- Image of a shell of Kermia albifuniculata (syntype at MNHN, Paris)

Scientific classification
- Kingdom: Animalia
- Phylum: Mollusca
- Class: Gastropoda
- Subclass: Caenogastropoda
- Order: Neogastropoda
- Superfamily: Conoidea
- Family: Raphitomidae
- Genus: Kermia
- Species: K. albifuniculata

Binomial name
- Kermia albifuniculata (Reeve, 1846)

Synonyms
- Clathurella albifuniculata (Reeve, 1846); Defrancia albifuniculata (Reeve, 1846); Pleurotoma albifuniculata Reeve, 1846 (original combination); Pseudodaphnella tincta aureotincta (Hervier, R.P.J., 1897)

= Kermia albifuniculata =

Species of gastropod

Kermia albifuniculata is a species of sea snail, a marine gastropod mollusc in the family Raphitomidae.

== Distribution ==
This species occurs off New Caledonia and Mauritius.
