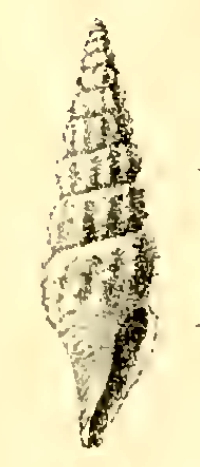
- Original image of a shell of Kermia aglaia

Scientific classification
- Kingdom: Animalia
- Phylum: Mollusca
- Class: Gastropoda
- Subclass: Caenogastropoda
- Order: Neogastropoda
- Superfamily: Conoidea
- Family: Raphitomidae
- Genus: Kermia
- Species: K. aglaia

Binomial name
- Kermia aglaia (Melvill, 1904)

Synonyms
- Clathurina aglaia (Melvill, 1904); Mangilia aglaia Melvill, 1904

= Kermia aglaia =

Species of gastropod

Kermia aglaia is a species of sea snail, a marine gastropod mollusk in the family Raphitomidae.

== Description ==
The length of the shell attains 10 mm, its diameter 3 mm.

A graceful, attenuate, fusiform species. The shell contains 11 - 12 whorls, of which 3 - 4 ocher whorls in the protoconch. The protoconch is ochraceous, and beautifully microscopically decussate. The subsequent whorls are ventricose and impressed at the suture. They are spirally crossed by 3 - 4 thick lirae. The whorls are longitudinally ribbed, fourteen on the body whorl. The ribs on the upper whorls are somewhat rougher. The aperture is oblong. The outer lip is thickened and fimbriate. The sinus is broad but not deep. The siphonal canal is produced.

== Distribution ==
This species occurs in the Persian Gulf.
