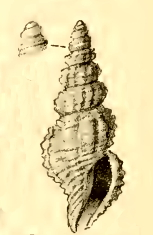
- Original image of a shell of Kermia catharia

Scientific classification
- Kingdom: Animalia
- Phylum: Mollusca
- Class: Gastropoda
- Subclass: Caenogastropoda
- Order: Neogastropoda
- Superfamily: Conoidea
- Family: Raphitomidae
- Genus: Kermia
- Species: K. catharia

Binomial name
- Kermia catharia (Melvill, 1917)

Synonyms
- Clathurina catharia Melvill, 1917

= Kermia catharia =

Species of gastropod

Kermia catharia is a species of sea snail, a marine gastropod mollusk in the family Raphitomidae.

== Description ==
The length of the shell attains 4 mm, its diameter 1.5 mm.

The small delicate, white shell has an ovate-fusiform shape. It contains 8 whorls of which 2½ in the protoconch, with a pale straw color, globose and microscopically cancellate ribs. The subsequent whorls contains thick, rounded ribs, crossed everywhere by rough, spiral lirae; nine ribs and nine lirae in the body whorl. The aperture is narrow. The outer lip is slightly incrassate. The columella is oblique. The siphonal canal is recurved.

== Distribution ==
This marine species occurs in the Gulf of Oman.
