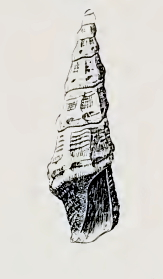
- Shell of Exomilus dyscritos

Scientific classification
- Kingdom: Animalia
- Phylum: Mollusca
- Class: Gastropoda
- Subclass: Caenogastropoda
- Order: Neogastropoda
- Superfamily: Conoidea
- Family: Raphitomidae
- Genus: Exomilus
- Species: E. dyscritos

Binomial name
- Exomilus dyscritos (Verco, 1906)

Synonyms
- Mangilia dyscritos Hedley and May, 1908; Terebra dyscritos Verco, 1906

= Exomilus dyscritos =

Species of gastropod

Exomilus dyscritos is a species of sea snail, a marine gastropod mollusk in the family Raphitomidae.

== Description ==
The length of the shell attains 9.1 mm, its diameter 2.7 mm.

(Original description) The solid, white shell is long and narrow. A co-type shows a brown tinting of the two carinae and of that part of the axial ribs connecting them, most marked at the tubercles of junction. It contains seven whorls. The protoconch contains two, homostrophe, convex whorls with 20 fine spiral incisions ending abruptly in a varix. The spire whorls show angulation at one-fourth the distance from the lower suture. They are uniformly concave between the angulations. Their sculpture shows axial ribs, valid, rounded nearly as wide as the interspaces, and spiral lirae, wider anteriorly, wider than their interspaces, crossing the ribs. There are six above the angulation, and two below it. Fine accremental striae can be seen under the lens. The suture is distinct, linear, undulating, convex between the ribs. The body whorl is oblong with two median rounded carinae, the upper larger, more prominent, forming the angulation (in the spire whorls), the lower producing the upper margin of the suture, tuberculated by the axial ribs, which cease at the lower one. Six spiral lirae above them, two between them, and ten of varying size below them on the concave base. Aperture subtriangular, outer side straight, inner sigmoid. Outer lip thin, slightly excavated just below the suture for one-sixth of its extent to form a shallow sulcus, with a margin feebly thickened and everted, then excavated again to the upper carina, an acute short projection between the two excavations. The edge is crenulated by spiral lirae and carinae. The outer lip begins at the lower carina and is concavo-convex to the anterior notch. The columella is concavo-convex from behind forwards.

== Distribution ==
This marine species is endemic to Australia and occurs off South Australia and Tasmania
