= Kermia bulbosa =

Scientific classification
- Kingdom: Animalia
- Phylum: Mollusca
- Class: Gastropoda
- Subclass: Caenogastropoda
- Order: Neogastropoda
- Superfamily: Conoidea
- Family: Raphitomidae
- Genus: Kermia
- Species: †K. bulbosa

Binomial name
- †Kermia bulbosa Harzhauser, 2014

Extinct species of gastropod

Kermia bulbosa is an extinct species of sea snail, a marine gastropod mollusk in the family Raphitomidae.

== Description ==
The length reaches 2.8 mm, the diameter is 1.1 mm.

== Distribution ==
Fossils of this extinct species were found in Early Miocene strata of the Kerala Basin in South West India.
