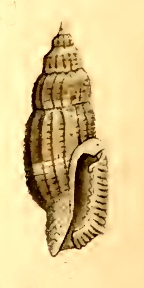
- Original image of a shell of Kermia subcylindrica

Scientific classification
- Kingdom: Animalia
- Phylum: Mollusca
- Class: Gastropoda
- Subclass: Caenogastropoda
- Order: Neogastropoda
- Superfamily: Conoidea
- Family: Raphitomidae
- Genus: Kermia
- Species: K. subcylindrica

Binomial name
- Kermia subcylindrica (Hervier, 1897)

Synonyms
- Clathurella subcylindrica Hervier, 1897; Defrancia subcylindrica (Hervier, 1897)

= Kermia subcylindrica =

Species of gastropod

Kermia subcylindrica is a species of sea snail, a marine gastropod mollusk in the family Raphitomidae.

== Description ==
The length of the shell attains 6 mm, its diameter 2.25 mm.

The turreted shell has a subcylindrical shape. The shell is slightly thickened and is a crystal white, translucent and brilliant. It is traversed by a large area of a very pale fawn, made more accentuated by the colour of the yellow-red decurrent cords on two-thirds of the whorls in their midst. The shell contains seven whorls. The two white, opaque whorls in the protoconch are rounded and smooth,. The intermediates whorls are rather convex, angular on the first whorls in the upper part, becoming rounder on the penultimate whorl and rather convex on the body whorl. The whorls are crossed by longitudinal ribs. These are oblique, flexuous, shallow, rounded, thin. Their intersections are wider on the upper whorls, closer on the penultimate and the body whorl. The many high spiral lirae are a little more slender than the ribs. When crossing the ribs, the produce a very fine granulation, forming an elegant reticulation, whose mesh is wider than higher and their interstices crisscross by very subtle growth streaks. The body whorl occupies more than half the total length of the shell. It is elongated, more convex, slightly rounded at the top, becoming angular towards the middle of the columellar side. It is strongly depressed below this angulation which is accentuated on the dorsal part, and ends in an elongated rectilinear base, surrounded by oblique, entirely white, pressed and granular cords. The aperture is elongated, narrow, rendered sinuous by the obliquity of the siphonal canal and the sinus. The aperture is white and transparent in the interior. The columella is almost straight and smooth in the middle, arched in its upper part where it ishows a small brilliant callosity, and obliquely truncated backwards, at the opening of the siphonal canal which is reversed and widened into a funnel. The outer lip has a plane convex profile, parallel to the columella over two-thirds of its arc. The lip is slightly rounded at the top. It becomes very strongly angular at the base. The last rib is varicose, thick, prominent with a protruding bead, traversing the top of the body whorl and then entering from the sinus to the base. The sinus is almost round, obliquely, deeply lodged in the thickening of the varicose rib and separated from the previous whorl by a prominence of the outer lip, where it unites with the columella.

== Distribution ==
This marine species occurs off the Loyalty Islands; Mactan Island, Philippines
