= Kermia clathurelloides =

Scientific classification
- Kingdom: Animalia
- Phylum: Mollusca
- Class: Gastropoda
- Subclass: Caenogastropoda
- Order: Neogastropoda
- Superfamily: Conoidea
- Family: Raphitomidae
- Genus: Kermia
- Species: K. clathurelloides

Binomial name
- Kermia clathurelloides Kilburn, 2009

Species of gastropod

Kermia clathurelloides is a species of sea snail, a marine gastropod mollusk in the family Raphitomidae.

== Description ==
The length of the shell attains 11 mm.

== Distribution ==
This marine species occurs off KwaZulu-Natal - East Cape Province, South Africa
