= Kermia brunnea =

Scientific classification
- Kingdom: Animalia
- Phylum: Mollusca
- Class: Gastropoda
- Subclass: Caenogastropoda
- Order: Neogastropoda
- Superfamily: Conoidea
- Family: Raphitomidae
- Genus: Kermia
- Species: K. brunnea

Binomial name
- Kermia brunnea (Pease, 1860)

Synonyms
- Clathurella brunnea Pease, 1860

Species of gastropod

Kermia brunnea is a species of sea snail, a marine gastropod mollusk in the family Raphitomidae.

== Description ==
The length of the shell attains 5 mm.

(Original description) The fusiformly elongate shell is ornamented with transverse granular ribs, and fine longitudinal raised striae. The whorls are slightly convex. The aperture is elongate-oval. The siphonal canal is short. The colour of the shell is dark brown.

== Distribution ==
This marine shell occurs off Hawaii.
