= Kermia eugenei =

Scientific classification
- Kingdom: Animalia
- Phylum: Mollusca
- Class: Gastropoda
- Subclass: Caenogastropoda
- Order: Neogastropoda
- Superfamily: Conoidea
- Family: Raphitomidae
- Genus: Kermia
- Species: K. eugenei

Binomial name
- Kermia eugenei Kilburn, 2009

Species of gastropod

Kermia eugenei is a species of sea snail, a marine gastropod mollusk in the family Raphitomidae.

== Description ==
The length of the shell varies between 3.5 mm and 4.5 mm.

== Distribution ==
This marine species occurs off KwaZulu-Natal, South Africa
