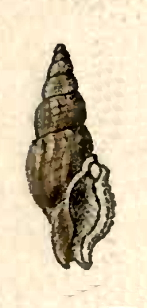
- Shell of Kermia margaritifera

Scientific classification
- Kingdom: Animalia
- Phylum: Mollusca
- Class: Gastropoda
- Subclass: Caenogastropoda
- Order: Neogastropoda
- Superfamily: Conoidea
- Family: Raphitomidae
- Genus: Kermia
- Species: K. margaritifera

Binomial name
- Kermia margaritifera (Reeve, 1846)

Synonyms
- Clathurina foraminata (Reeve, L.A., 1845) (nomen dubium); Mangilia margaritifera (Reeve, 1846); Pleurotoma margaritifera Reeve, 1846 (original combination)

= Kermia margaritifera =

Species of gastropod

Kermia margaritifera is a species of sea snail, a marine gastropod mollusc in the family Raphitomidae.

== Description ==
The length of the shell attains 7 mm.

The whorls are rounded or very slightly shouldered, reticulated by longitudinal and revolving fine ribs and lines. The color is yellowish brown, tinged with chestnut, sometimes forming an indistinct central band.

== Distribution ==
This species occurs in the Persian Gulf and off India.
