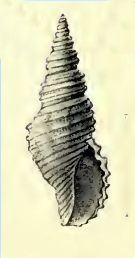
- Original image of a shell of Clathurina receptoria

Scientific classification
- Kingdom: Animalia
- Phylum: Mollusca
- Class: Gastropoda
- Subclass: Caenogastropoda
- Order: Neogastropoda
- Superfamily: Conoidea
- Family: Raphitomidae
- Genus: Clathurina
- Species: C. receptoria

Binomial name
- Clathurina receptoria (Melvill & Standen, 1901)

Synonyms
- Clathurina receptoria (Melvill, J.C. & R. Standen, 1901); Kermia receptoria (Melvill, J.C. & R. Standen, 1901)

= Clathurina receptoria =

Species of gastropod

Clathurina receptoria is a species of sea snail, a marine gastropod mollusk in the family Raphitomidae.

The genus Clathurina is a synonym of Kermia W. R. B. Oliver, 1915.

== Description ==
The length of the shell attains 18.5 mm, its diameter 6 mm.

A most graceful, dark ocher, fusiform species. It contains seven angulate whorls. The protoconch is vitreous and purple colored. The subsequent whorls are impressed at the suture. The wide aperture is oblong and is whitish on the inside. The outer lip is lunulate. The columella stands almost upright. The siphonal canal is short.

== Distribution ==
This marine species occurs off the Makran coast, Baluchistan.
