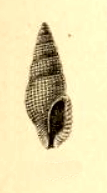
- Shell of Kermia foraminata

Scientific classification
- Kingdom: Animalia
- Phylum: Mollusca
- Class: Gastropoda
- Subclass: Caenogastropoda
- Order: Neogastropoda
- Superfamily: Conoidea
- Family: Raphitomidae
- Genus: Kermia
- Species: K. foraminata

Binomial name
- Kermia foraminata (Reeve, 1845)

Synonyms
- Clathurella foraminata (Reeve, 1845); Clathurella foraminata var. camacina Melvill, 1898; Clathurina foraminata (Reeve, 1845); Pleurotoma foraminata Reeve, 1845 (original combination)

= Kermia foraminata =

Species of gastropod

Kermia foraminata is a species of sea snail, a marine gastropod mollusk in the family Raphitomidae.

This is a nomen dubium.

== Description ==
The length of the shell attains 9 mm, its diameter 2.75 mm.

The three specimens before the author (J.C. Melvill) are alike in shape, two are dark-brown in colour, the third a paler ochre yellow. The clathrations are beautifully regular, and in a young specimen the point of junction between the longitudinal and spiral lirae is gemmuled with shining small papillae. The shell contains seven or eight whorls. The aperture is acute. The outer lip is thickened. The crenulated sinus is wide, but not cut deeply. The columella is nearly straight.

== Distribution ==
This marine species occurs off Karachi, Pakistan.
