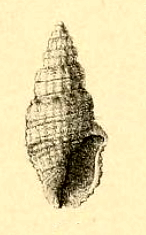
- Original image of a shell of Kermia thespesia

Scientific classification
- Kingdom: Animalia
- Phylum: Mollusca
- Class: Gastropoda
- Subclass: Caenogastropoda
- Order: Neogastropoda
- Superfamily: Conoidea
- Family: Raphitomidae
- Genus: Kermia
- Species: K. thespesia

Binomial name
- Kermia thespesia (Melvill & Standen, 1896)

Synonyms
- Clathurella subfelina Hervier, 1897; Daphnella thespesia Melvill & Standen, 1896 (basionym); Pleurotomoides thespesia (Melvill & Sanden, 1896)

= Kermia thespesia =

Species of gastropod

Kermia thespesia is a species of sea snail, a marine gastropod mollusk in the family Raphitomidae.

== Description ==
The length of the shell attains 6 mm, its diameter 2.5 mm.

(Original description) A beautiful species, by the description and figure allied to Daphnella varicosa (Souverbie & Montrozier, 1874) from the same region. There are, however, no signs of varices. The shell is pure delicate white, with seven or eight whorls, of which three are apical and vitreous brown. The remainder are finely decussate. Where the spiral lines cross the oblique riblets a gemmuliferous appearance is presented. The whorls are squarely ventricose, impressed at the sutures. The coloration consists in orange-brown lines, different in number in every specimen. Some specimens are almost plain, others have a row of square brown spots just below the suture on the body whorl. The aperture is oblong. The outer lip is incrassate, suturally expanded, finely denticulate within. The sinus is broad, but not deep.

== Distribution ==
This marine species occurs off the Loyalty Islands and off Mauritius, Taiwan, New Caledonia and in the Coral Sea.
