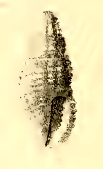
- Original image of a shell of Kermia episema

Scientific classification
- Kingdom: Animalia
- Phylum: Mollusca
- Class: Gastropoda
- Subclass: Caenogastropoda
- Order: Neogastropoda
- Superfamily: Conoidea
- Family: Raphitomidae
- Genus: Kermia
- Species: K. episema

Binomial name
- Kermia episema (Melvill & Standen, 1896)

Synonyms
- Clathurella episema Melvill & Standen, 1896; Clathurella euzonata minor (var.) Hervier, R.P.J., 1897; Philbertia episema (Melvill & Standen, 1896); Raphitoma euzonata Hervier, 1897

= Kermia episema =

Species of gastropod

Kermia episema is a species of sea snail, a marine gastropod mollusk in the family Raphitomidae.

== Description ==
The length of the shell attains 4.5 mm, its diameter 1.25 mm.

(Original description) This neat little species has the usual fusiform shape,. It contains five whorls, exclusive of the apical, not present in our specimens. The whorls are clathrate, with longitudinal ribs and spiral lirae, these being pale ochreous-white, the interstices darker ochreous. The body whorl is slightly prolonged and sculptured in the same way as the upper whorls. One or two of the longitudinal ribs seem thicker than the others, giving a very slightly varicose appearance. The columellar margin is straight, simple, six denticled. The outer lip is incrassate, six denticled within. The sinus is deep and large.

== Distribution ==
This marine species occurs off Taiwan to Australia; also off the Fiji Islands, Cook Islands, New Caledonia
