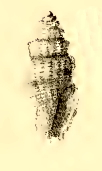
- Original image of a shell of Kermia caletria

Scientific classification
- Kingdom: Animalia
- Phylum: Mollusca
- Class: Gastropoda
- Subclass: Caenogastropoda
- Order: Neogastropoda
- Superfamily: Conoidea
- Family: Raphitomidae
- Genus: Kermia
- Species: K. caletria

Binomial name
- Kermia caletria (Melvill & Standen, 1896)

Synonyms
- Clathurella caletria Melvill & Standen, 1896

= Kermia caletria =

Species of gastropod

Kermia caletria is a species of sea snail, marine gastropod mollusk in the family Raphitomidae. Measuring a length of 4.5 mm, with a 1.5 mm diameter, the species is white and slightly ochraceous at the sutures. It contains seven whorls, turreted, two smooth whorls being apical, finely and regularly clathrate. The aperture is sinuously-oblong. The crenulate outer lip is simple within. The columellar margin is minutely toothed towards the base. The sinus is wide. The siphonal canal is a little produced. There is a very pale ochraceous band round the middle of the body whorl, as at the sutures. The sinus is deeply cut behind. At the sutural margin of the outer lip is a bright ochraceous thickened callus.

== Distribution ==
This marine species occurs off New Caledonia.
