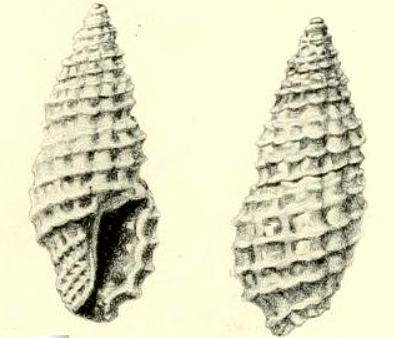
- Original image of a shell of Kermia alveolata

Scientific classification
- Kingdom: Animalia
- Phylum: Mollusca
- Class: Gastropoda
- Subclass: Caenogastropoda
- Order: Neogastropoda
- Superfamily: Conoidea
- Family: Raphitomidae
- Genus: Kermia
- Species: K. alveolata

Binomial name
- Kermia alveolata (Dautzenberg, 1912)

Synonyms
- Clathurella alveolata Dautzenberg, 1912; Clathurella meheusti Dautzenberg, 1912; Philbertia alveolata Dautzenberg, 1912

= Kermia alveolata =

Species of gastropod

Kermia alveolata is a species of sea snail, a marine gastropod mollusk in the family Raphitomidae.

== Description ==
The length of the shell attains 5.2 mm, its diameter 2.3 mm.

The solid, elongate shell has a uniform dull color and consists of 7 convex whorls, separated by an impressed suture. The two whorls of the protoconch are smooth. The subsequent whorls show axial ribs (10 on the body whorl) and spirally decurrent cords (3 on the penultimate, 6 on the body whorl), forming a remarkable network with quadrangular meshes. The decurrent cords are higher than the axial ribs, forming nodules on the intersections. The body whorl is contracted below but then swells out around the base of the columella. The aperture is oblong and almost quadrangular. The siphonal canal is short and open. The columella is straight and shows a narrow callus. The thick outer lip is denticulate and shows on top a little cutout.

== Distribution ==
This marine species occurs West Africa, off French Guinea, Senegal and Ivory Coast, and Singapore Strait
