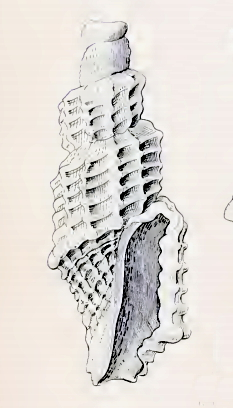
- Original image of a shell of Exomilus lutarius

Scientific classification
- Kingdom: Animalia
- Phylum: Mollusca
- Class: Gastropoda
- Subclass: Caenogastropoda
- Order: Neogastropoda
- Superfamily: Conoidea
- Family: Raphitomidae
- Genus: Exomilus
- Species: E. lutarius

Binomial name
- Exomilus lutarius (Hedley, 1907)

Synonyms
- Mangelia lutaria Hedley, 1907

= Exomilus lutarius =

Species of gastropod

Exomilus lutarius is a species of sea snail, a marine gastropod mollusk in the family Raphitomidae.

== Description ==
The length of the shell attains 3 mm, its diameter 1.15 mm.

(Original description) The small, solid shell is cylindrical and abruptly truncate above. It contains five whorls, three forming the protoconch, sloping on the shoulder, perpendicular at the side, and concave at the base. The colour of the shell is grey (? bleached).

The sculpture consists of deep narrow pits are formed by the intersection of radial and spiral sculpture. The radials are strong, prominent and perpendicular. The ribs are continuous, about a dozen to a whorl, knotted at the crossing of the spirals, which number four on the upper and twelve on the lower whorl. The spiral defines the basal angle larger and more prominent.

Protoconch : first whorl wound oblique to the axis of the main shell, the second overhanging the third, appearing as if the apex was wrapped in a turban.

The aperture is long, narrow, fortified by a heavy varix, in the anterior angle of which is excavated a deep sinus. The columella is nearly straight, overlaid by a slight callus. The siphonal canal is very short and wide.

== Distribution ==
This marine species is endemic to Australia and occurs off New South Wales.
