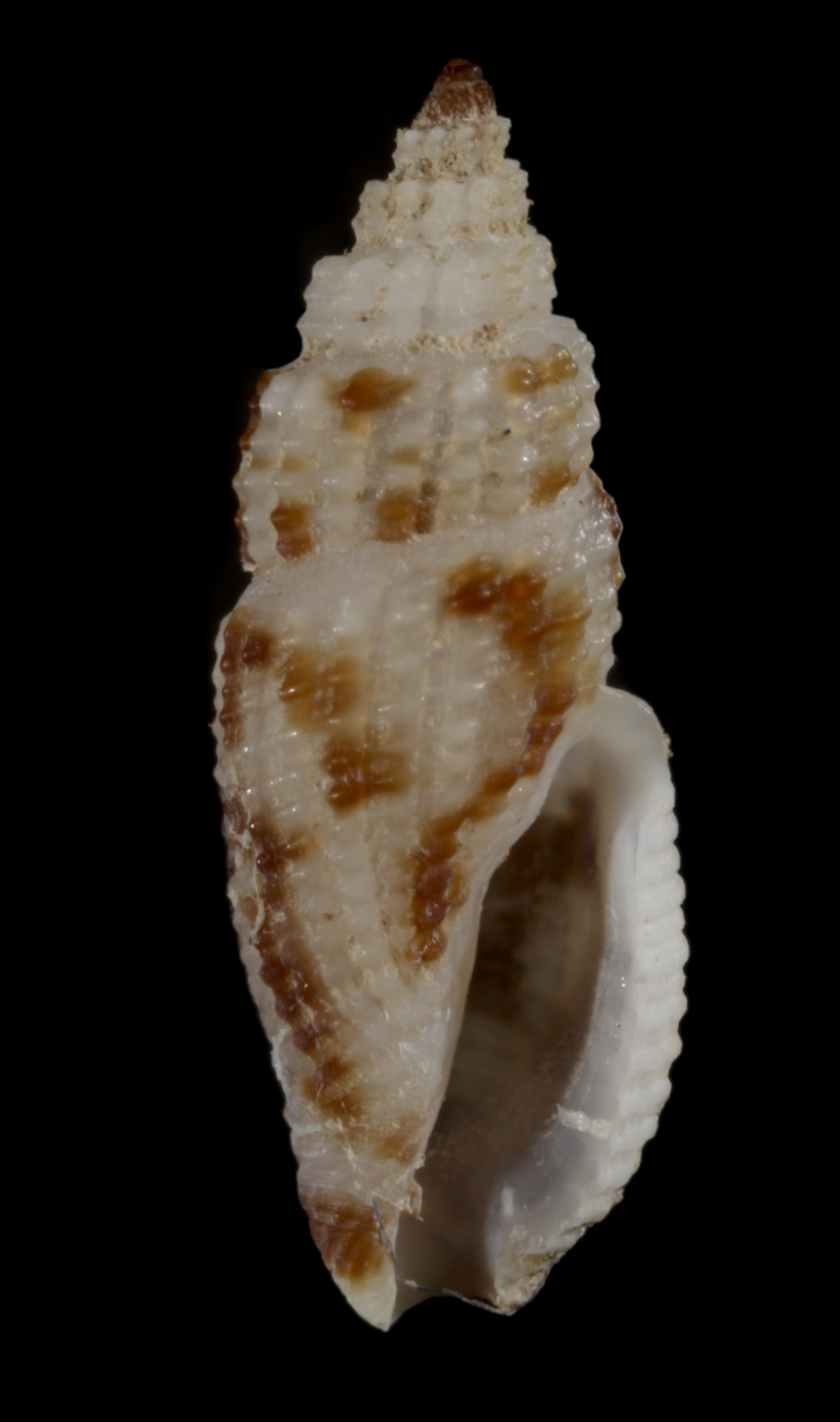
- Image of a shell of Kermia felina

Scientific classification
- Kingdom: Animalia
- Phylum: Mollusca
- Class: Gastropoda
- Subclass: Caenogastropoda
- Order: Neogastropoda
- Superfamily: Conoidea
- Family: Raphitomidae
- Genus: Kermia
- Species: K. felina

Binomial name
- Kermia felina (Reeve, 1843)

Synonyms
- Clathurella felina (Reeve, 1843); Clathurella picta Dunker, R.W., 1871; Clavatula felina brevispira Hervier, 1897; Philbertia felina (Reeve, 1843); Pleurotoma felina Reeve, 1843 (original combination; name attributed by Reeve to Hinds)

= Kermia felina =

Species of gastropod

Kermia felina is a species of sea snail, a marine gastropod mollusc in the family Raphitomidae.

== Description ==
The length of the shell varies between 5 mm and 10 mm.

The shell is decussated by longitudinal and revolving sculpture. It is yellowish white, with chestnut short longitudinal strigations upon the granules, often upon every alternate rib, interrupted by a central white space, and again painted towards the base. Sometimes this coloring is broken up and more or less dispersed over the surface.

== Distribution ==
This species occurs off Taiwan, Samoa and Queensland, Australia.
