= Kermia albicaudata =

Scientific classification
- Kingdom: Animalia
- Phylum: Mollusca
- Class: Gastropoda
- Subclass: Caenogastropoda
- Order: Neogastropoda
- Superfamily: Conoidea
- Family: Raphitomidae
- Genus: Kermia
- Species: K. albicaudata

Binomial name
- Kermia albicaudata (E.A. Smith, 1882)

Synonyms
- Clathurina albicaudata (E.A. Smith, 1882); Pleurotoma (Defrancia ?) albicaudata E.A. Smith, 1882

Species of gastropod

Kermia albicaudata is a species of sea snail, a marine gastropod mollusk in the family Raphitomidae.

== Description ==
The length of the shell attains 4 mm, its diameter 1½ mm.

The oval shell is acuminate. The contrast of colour, the chief portion of the shell being a rich brown, with the protoconch and lower part of the body whorl white, is very remarkable. The shell contains in total seven whorls. The 2 - 3 whorls in the protoconch are finely reticulate. The other whorls are convex. The suture is not very impressed. The reticulate sculpture consists of about 12 longitudinal ribs and 3 - 4 spiral lirae that form small, glossy nodules with the ribs. The body whorl shows 12 spiral lirae of which the lower six show a granular white colour. The aperture measures slightly less than half the length of the shell. The outer lip is very thick and denticulate within with 4 - 5 teeth. The sinus is not very deep and located near the suture. The siphonal canal is short.

== Distribution ==
This species occurs in the Persian Gulf.
