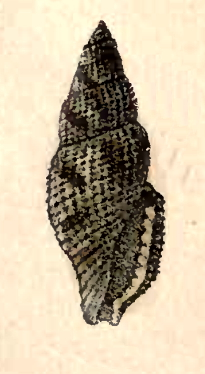
- Original image of a shell of Kermia apicalis

Scientific classification
- Kingdom: Animalia
- Phylum: Mollusca
- Class: Gastropoda
- Subclass: Caenogastropoda
- Order: Neogastropoda
- Superfamily: Conoidea
- Family: Raphitomidae
- Genus: Kermia
- Species: K. apicalis

Binomial name
- Kermia apicalis (Montrouzier, 1861)

Synonyms
- Clathurella apicalis (Montrouzier, 1861); Defrancia apicalis (Montrouzier, 1861); Pleurotoma apicalis Montrouzier, 1861 (original combination)

= Kermia apicalis =

Species of gastropod

Kermia apicalis is a species of sea snail, a marine gastropod mollusk in the family Raphitomidae.

== Description ==
The length of the shell attains 9 mm.

== Distribution ==
This marine species occurs off New Caledonia.
