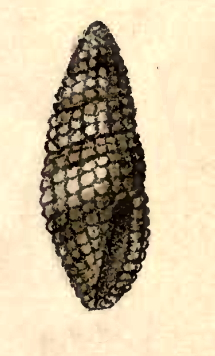
- Shell of Kermia pumila

Scientific classification
- Kingdom: Animalia
- Phylum: Mollusca
- Class: Gastropoda
- Subclass: Caenogastropoda
- Order: Neogastropoda
- Superfamily: Conoidea
- Family: Raphitomidae
- Genus: Kermia
- Species: K. pumila

Binomial name
- Kermia pumila (Mighels, 1845)

Synonyms
- Clathurella pumila Tryon, 1884; Kermia violacea Pease, W.H., 1868; Mangelia digitale Reeve, 1846; Phibertia (Kermia) pumila Cernohorsky, 1978; Pleurotoma clandestina Deshayes, 1863; Pleurotoma pumila Mighels, 1845 (original combination); Pleurotoma reticulata Garrett, 1857 (invalid: junior homonym of Pleurotoma reticulata T. Brown, 1827 and P. reticulata Bronn, 1831)

= Kermia pumila =

Species of gastropod

Kermia pumila is a species of sea snail, a marine gastropod mollusc in the family Raphitomidae.

It was assigned to Kermia by Zhang, 1995.

== Description ==
The length of the shell varies between 3.5 mm and 6 mm.

The shell is pinkish white, with an orange-brown band near the sutures, and a broader one below the middle of the body whorl.

== Distribution ==
This marine species has a wide distribution. It occurs off Polynesia; Hawaii; Fiji; Okinawa; Mascarenes, Seychelles, North KwaZulu-Natal, and South Africa.
