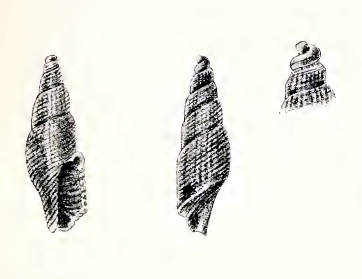
- Original image of a shell of Exomilus telescopialis

Scientific classification
- Kingdom: Animalia
- Phylum: Mollusca
- Class: Gastropoda
- Subclass: Caenogastropoda
- Order: Neogastropoda
- Superfamily: Conoidea
- Family: Raphitomidae
- Genus: Exomilus
- Species: E. telescopialis

Binomial name
- Exomilus telescopialis (Verco, 1896)

Synonyms
- Drillia pentagonalis Verco, 1896

= Exomilus telescopialis =

Species of gastropod

Exomilus telescopialis is a species of sea snail, a marine gastropod mollusk in the family Raphitomidae.

== Description ==
The length of the shell attains 4.5 mm, its diameter 1.25 mm.

(Original description) The minute shell is thin. It contains six whorls, including the protoconch. The protoconch consists of 1 1/2 whorls, smooth, with deep impressed suture. The apex is exserted. The whorls of the spire are sloping, nearly straight, gradated, angled at junction of posterior and middle fourth. Behind this the whorl is bevelled to the suture, which is distinct and impressed. The whorls are sculptured with spiral lirae, four to six in front of the angle, two behind it, flatly rounded, equidistant, wider than the interspaces. The Longitudinal lirae are numerous, equidistant, about 20 in the penultimate whorl, narrower than the interspaces. In some specimens crossing the spiral lirae and wider than them, generally most marked and forming conspicuous costae in the second and third spire-whorls. In others they are narrower, crossed by the spiral lirae, giving a cancellated appearance. The body whorl is nearly cylindrical, angled a little below the suture and again at the periphery, below which it is excavately contracted to the base. It is provided with spiral lirae, two behind the upper angle, about seven between the angles, and nine or ten below, the most valid forming a minute carina at the lower angle, crossing or crossed by 18 to 20 wider or narrower longitudinal lirae continued to the base, though less conspicuous here. The aperture is elongately rhomboidal and wider anteriorly. The outer lip is simple, thin, crenulated, with a well-marked semi-circular sinus from the posterior angulation to the suture. The lip is lip slanting obliquely from the carina to the anterior notch. The columella is straight. The inner lip is inconspicuous except behind, where there is a columellar callus, from which springs the acute upper boundary of the sinus. The notch is simple, anterior extremity truncated obliquely to the left. Ornament uniform, rusty-brown or white.

== Distribution ==
This marine species is endemic to Australia and occurs off South Australia and Victoria
