= Kermia euryacme =

Scientific classification
- Kingdom: Animalia
- Phylum: Mollusca
- Class: Gastropoda
- Subclass: Caenogastropoda
- Order: Neogastropoda
- Superfamily: Conoidea
- Family: Raphitomidae
- Genus: Kermia
- Species: K. euryacme

Binomial name
- Kermia euryacme (Melvill, J.C., 1927)

Synonyms
- Heterocithara euryacme Melvill, 1927 superseded combination

Species of gastropod

Kermia euryacme is a species of sea snail, a marine gastropod mollusc in the family Raphitomidae.

== Description ==
The length of the shell varies between 4 mm and 5 mm.

== Distribution ==
This marine species occurs off Taiwan.
