= Kermia informa =

Scientific classification
- Kingdom: Animalia
- Phylum: Mollusca
- Class: Gastropoda
- Subclass: Caenogastropoda
- Order: Neogastropoda
- Superfamily: Conoidea
- Family: Raphitomidae
- Genus: Kermia
- Species: K. informa

Binomial name
- Kermia informa McLean & Poorman, 1971

Species of gastropod

Kermia informa is a species of sea snail, a marine gastropod mollusk in the family Raphitomidae.

== Description ==
The length of the shell attains 6 mm.

== Distribution ==
This marine species occurs off the Galapagos Islands.
