= Exomilus cancellatus =

Scientific classification
- Kingdom: Animalia
- Phylum: Mollusca
- Class: Gastropoda
- Subclass: Caenogastropoda
- Order: Neogastropoda
- Superfamily: Conoidea
- Family: Raphitomidae
- Genus: Exomilus
- Species: E. cancellatus

Binomial name
- Exomilus cancellatus (Beddome, 1883)

Synonyms
- Drillia cancellata (Beddome, 1883); Mangelia cancellata Beddome, 1883

Species of gastropod

Exomilus cancellatus is a species of sea snail, a marine gastropod mollusk in the family Raphitomidae.

== Description ==
The length of the shell attains 4.5 mm, its diameter 1.5 mm.

(Original description) The small, fulvous brown shell is narrowly fusiform and turreted. It contains five whorls, sloping angulate above plicate lengthwise. The interstices are broadly striate, giving the whole shell a cancellated appearance. The aperture is narrowly oval. The outer lip is simple.

== Distribution ==
This marine species is endemic to Australia and occurs off Tasmania
