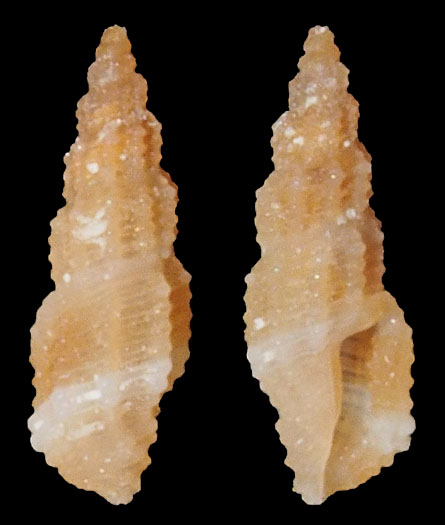
- Kermia Aniani web

Scientific classification
- Kingdom: Animalia
- Phylum: Mollusca
- Class: Gastropoda
- Subclass: Caenogastropoda
- Order: Neogastropoda
- Superfamily: Conoidea
- Family: Raphitomidae
- Genus: Kermia
- Species: K. aniani

Binomial name
- Kermia aniani Kay, 1979

= Kermia aniani =

Species of gastropod

Kermia aniani is a species of sea snail, a marine gastropod mollusk in the family Raphitomidae.

== Description ==
The length of the shell attains 3.1 mm, its diameter is 1.2 mm.

== Distribution ==
This marine species occurs off Hawaii and Tahiti.
