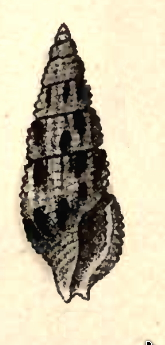
- Shell of Kermia daedalea

Scientific classification
- Kingdom: Animalia
- Phylum: Mollusca
- Class: Gastropoda
- Subclass: Caenogastropoda
- Order: Neogastropoda
- Superfamily: Conoidea
- Family: Raphitomidae
- Genus: Kermia
- Species: K. daedalea

Binomial name
- Kermia daedalea (Garrett, 1873)

Synonyms
- Clathurella daedalea Garrett, 1873 (original combination); Clathurella phaedra Hervier, 1897; Philbertia daedalea (Garrett, 1873); Philbertia phaedra (Hervier, 1897); Pseudodaphnella phaedra (Hervier, 1897)

= Kermia daedalea =

Species of gastropod

Kermia daedalea is a species of sea snail, a marine gastropod mollusk in the family Raphitomidae.

== Description ==
The length of the shell varies between 3 mm and 8.5 mm.

The yellowish white shell is maculated with small irregular chestnut-brown spots, mostly confined to the ribs. The whorls are slightly tabulated at the sutures;. The ribs are rounded and compressed, 13-14 on the body whorl, slightly oblique, crossed by small, revolving elevated lines, forming granules at the intersections. The sinus is deep. The outer lip is varicose, crenulate and shortly lirate within. The columella is faintly rugose with oblique wrinkles.

== Distribution ==
This species occurs off Fiji; Vanuatu; Hawaii; South Africa.
