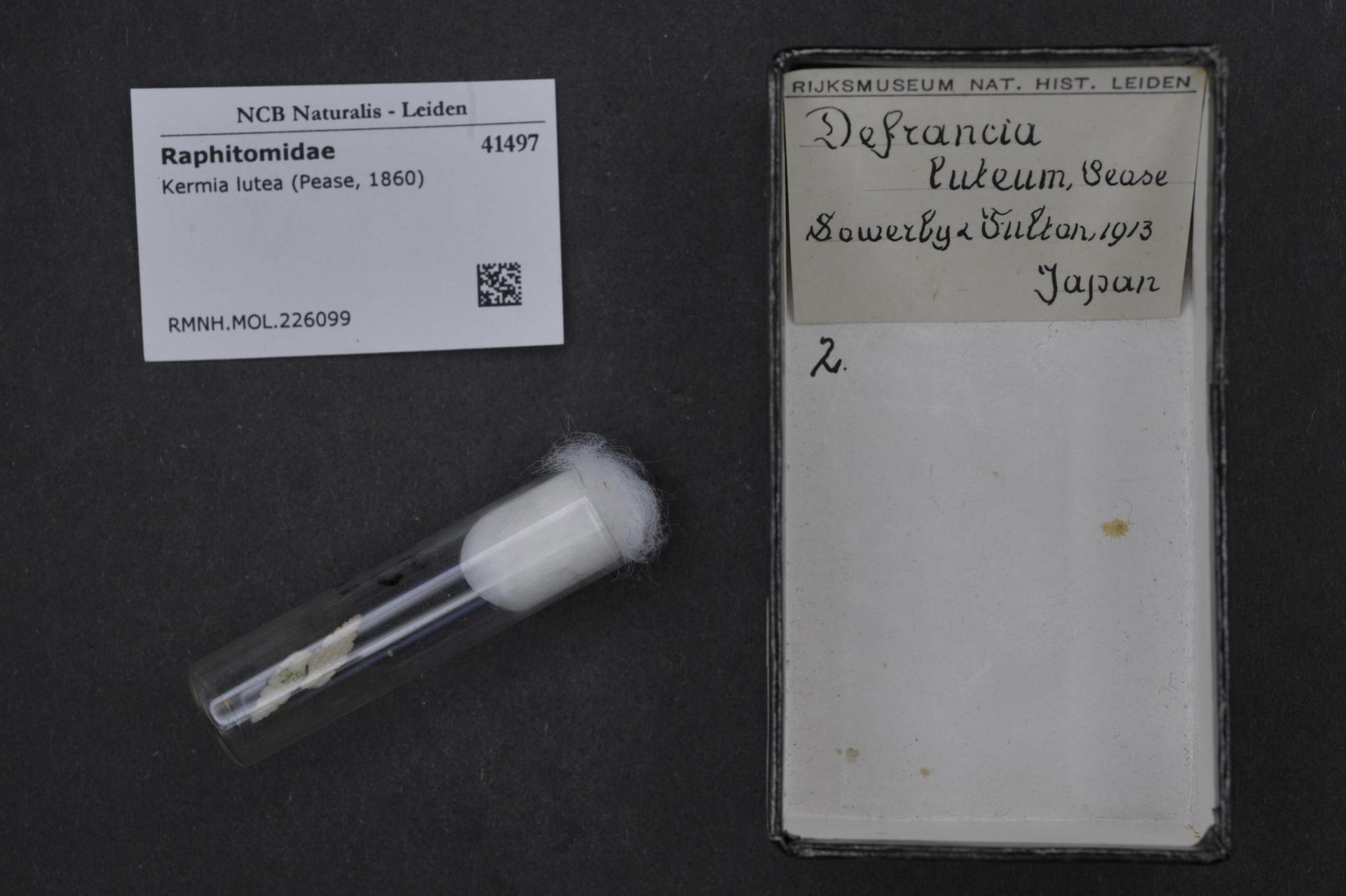

Scientific classification
- Kingdom: Animalia
- Phylum: Mollusca
- Class: Gastropoda
- Subclass: Caenogastropoda
- Order: Neogastropoda
- Superfamily: Conoidea
- Family: Raphitomidae
- Genus: Kermia
- Species: K. lutea

Binomial name
- Kermia lutea (Pease, 1860)

Synonyms
- Borsonia lutea Pease, 1860; Mangilia thereganum Melvill & Standen, 1896

= Kermia lutea =

Species of gastropod

Kermia lutea is a species of sea snail, a marine gastropod mollusk in the family Raphitomidae.

== Description ==
The length of the shell attains 7 mm.

(Original description) The fusiform, solid shell is shining. The whorls are convex, angulated at the sutures and longitudinally regularly and closely ribbed, crossed by regular transverse ridges. The aperture is narrow. The outer lip is thick and denticulated within. The siphonal canal is produced aud recurved. The colour of the shell is light yellowish-brown.

== Distribution ==
This marine species occurs off the Bonins, Japan; Philippines
