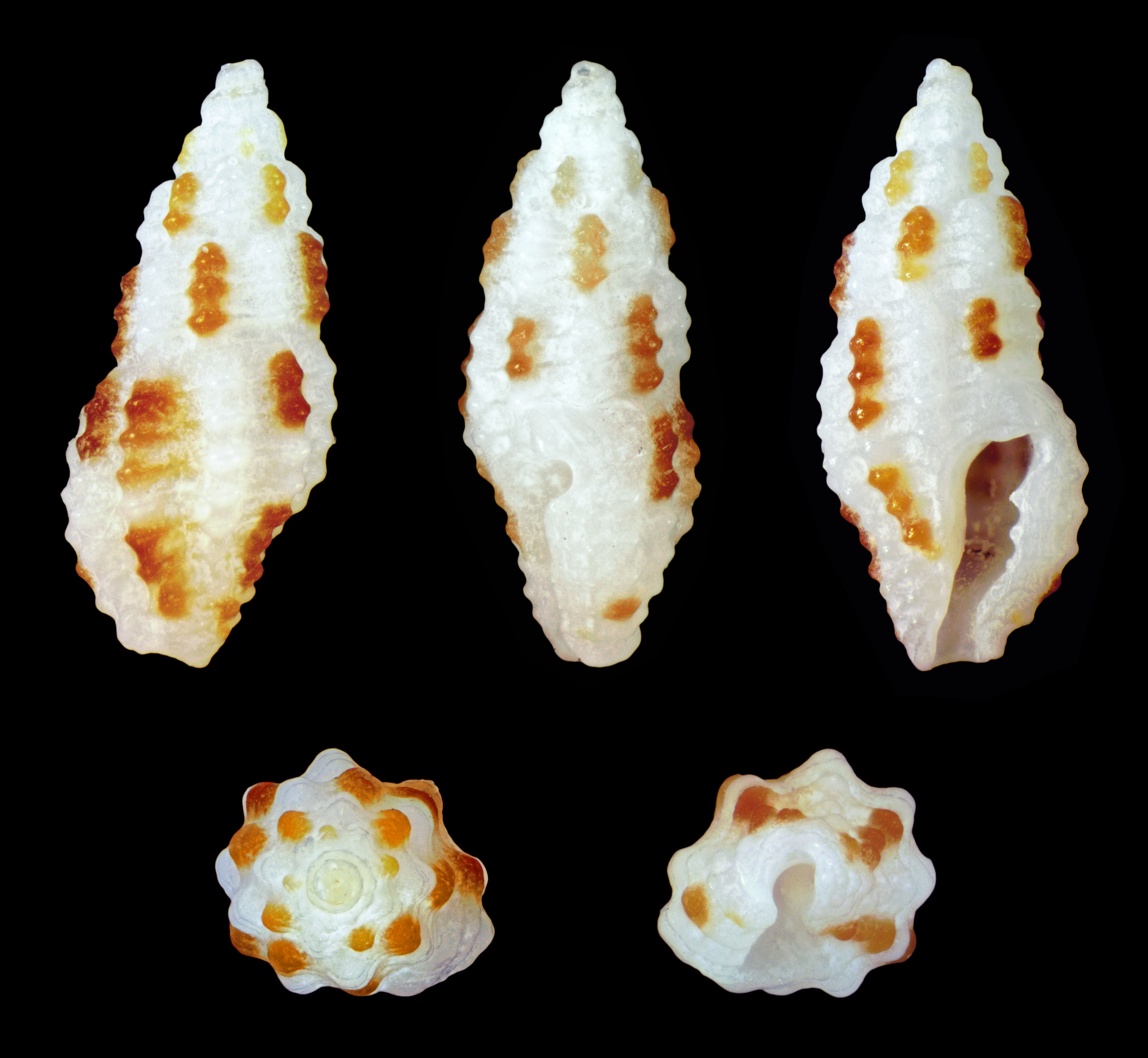
- Shells of Kermia maculosa

Scientific classification
- Kingdom: Animalia
- Phylum: Mollusca
- Class: Gastropoda
- Subclass: Caenogastropoda
- Order: Neogastropoda
- Superfamily: Conoidea
- Family: Raphitomidae
- Genus: Kermia
- Species: K. maculosa

Binomial name
- Kermia maculosa (Pease, 1863)

Synonyms
- Clathurella maculosa Pease, 1863 (original combination); Pleurotomoides maculosa (Pease, 1863)

= Kermia maculosa =

Species of gastropod

Kermia maculosa is a species of sea snail, a marine gastropod mollusk in the family Raphitomidae.

== Description ==
The length of the shell varies between 5 mm and 6 mm; its diameter 2½ mm.

(Original description) The oblong-ovate shell is white, shining and sparsely blotched with dark chestnut-brown. It is longitudinally ribbed and transversely elevately striated. The whorls are convex. The aperture is less than one-half the length of the shell.

== Distribution ==
This marine species occurs off the Philippines.
