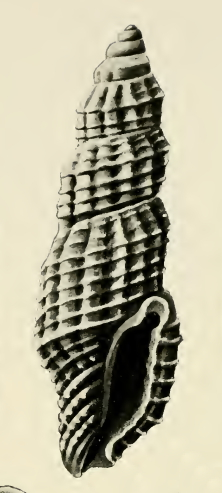
- Shell of Exomilus edychrous

Scientific classification
- Kingdom: Animalia
- Phylum: Mollusca
- Class: Gastropoda
- Subclass: Caenogastropoda
- Order: Neogastropoda
- Superfamily: Conoidea
- Family: Raphitomidae
- Genus: Exomilus
- Species: E. edychrous

Binomial name
- Exomilus edychrous (Hervier, 1897)

Synonyms
- Clathurella edychroa Hervier, 1897 (original combination); Clathurella edychroa var. violacea Hervier, 1897; Exomilus anxius (Hedley, 1909); Exomilus edychroa violacea Hervier, 1897; Kermia anxia Hedley, 1909; Kermia anxius Hedley, 1909; Kermia edychroa (Hervier, 1897); Kermia gracilis de Folin, 1879; Mangelia anxia Hedley, 1909; Pleurotoma gracilis de Folin, 1879 (invalid: junior homonym of Pleurotoma gracilis Conrad, 1830 and P. gracilis Scacchi, 1836)

= Exomilus edychrous =

Species of gastropod

Exomilus edychrous is a species of sea snail, a marine gastropod mollusk in the family Raphitomidae.

== Description ==
The length of the shell varies between 3 mm and 4.1 mm; its diameter is 1.1 mm.

(Original description) The small, solid, shell is subcylindrical. The shoulder is sloping, the body perpendicular, the base excavate, sharply angled at base and shoulder. The colour of all specimens seen are faded, but appear to have been buff, the protoconch and spots on the lower whorls darker, the basal keel white. The teleoconch contains three whorls. The protoconch consists of 3½ whorls, of which the first is turbinate, slightly tilted and engraved with microscopic spirally punctured lines, followed by two transitional whorls keeled at the periphery, and ornamented by fine close obliquely radiating riblets. The adult sculpture : on the body whorl, fifteen spiral cords, of which the third and eighth are prominent, expressing the angle above and below the barrel of the whorl, the basal cords are broken into beads. The penultimate whorl shows six, and the antepenultimate with three spirals. Broader than the spirals are the perpendicular radials, fourteen on the body whorl, and proportionately fewer on the rest. Commencing at the suture and vanishing on the base, they raise tubercles at the intersection of the spirals. The resulting meshes enclose deep pits in which is a microscopic shagreen surface. The aperture is contracted, straight above, flexed below, fortified by a broad strong varix, out of which a deeply notched subcircular anal sulcus is excavated. The spiral sculpture traverses the varix. Within the outer lip are four tubercles. The inner lip is excavate. The siphonal canal is short and broad.

== Distribution ==
This marine species has a wide distribution: New Caledonia, Queensland, Australia; off Réunion and Southeast Africa
