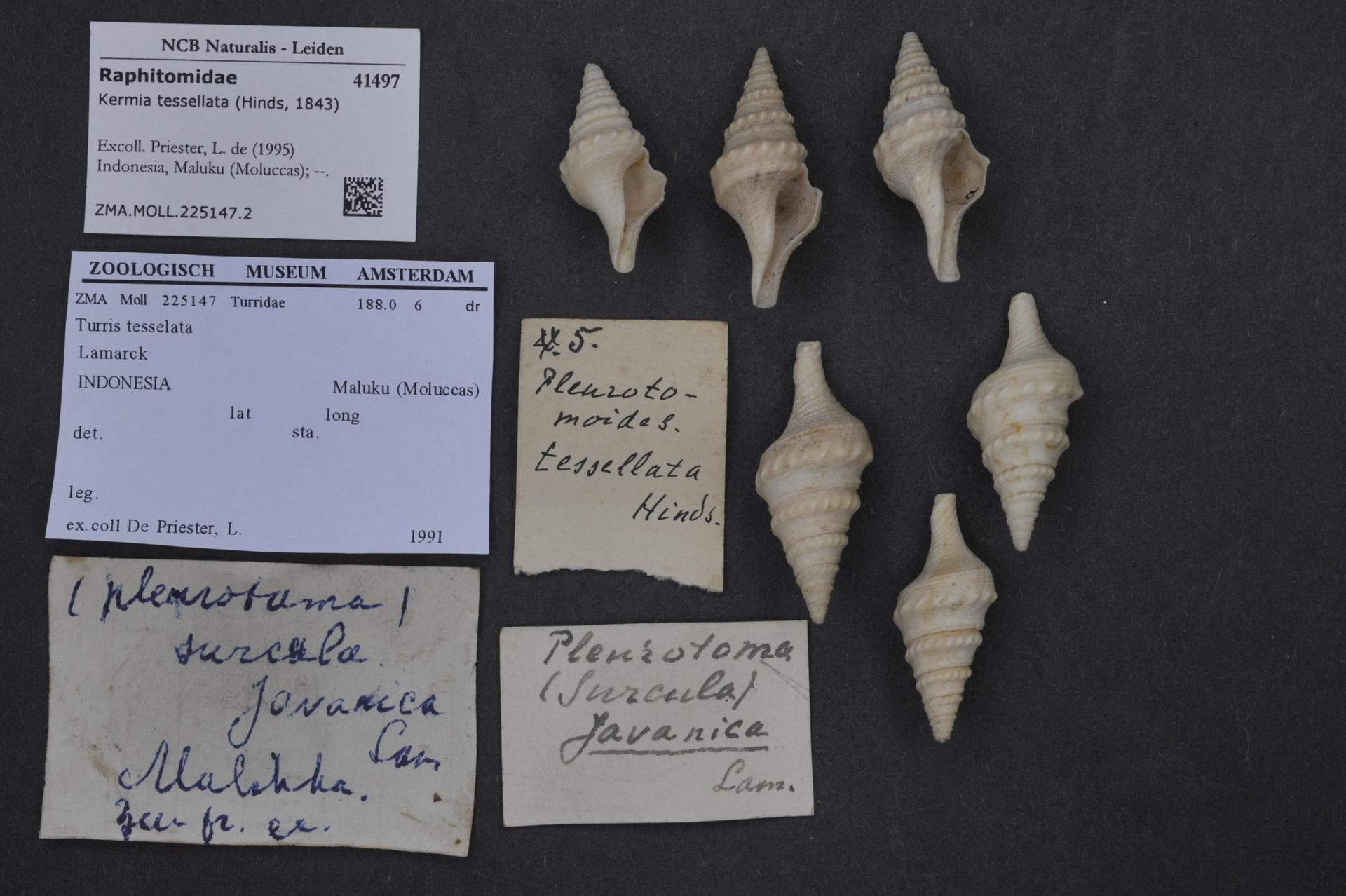
- Shells of Kermia tessellata

Scientific classification
- Kingdom: Animalia
- Phylum: Mollusca
- Class: Gastropoda
- Subclass: Caenogastropoda
- Order: Neogastropoda
- Superfamily: Conoidea
- Family: Raphitomidae
- Genus: Kermia
- Species: K. tessellata

Binomial name
- Kermia tessellata (Hinds, 1843)

Synonyms
- Clathurella apicalis rufula (f) Hervier, R.P.J., 1897; Clathurella tessellata; Clavatula tessellata Hinds, 1843 (basionym); Defrancia mauritiana Sowerby, G.B. III, 1893; Defrancia tessellata (Hinds, 1843); Philbertia (Kermia) lata Hinds, 1843 [sic].; Pleurotoma apicalis Montrouzier, R.P. in Souverbie, S.M., 1861; Pleurotoma forbesii Montrouzier, R.P. in Souverbie, M. 1861; Pleurotomoides tessellata (Hinds, 1843); Pseudodaphnella tessellata (Hinds, 1843)

= Kermia tessellata =

Species of gastropod

Kermia tessellata is a species of sea snail, a marine gastropod mollusk in the family Raphitomidae.

== Description ==
The shell grows to a length of 10 mm

The whorls are granular, decussated with longitudinal and spiral lines. They are painted with brown somewhat square spots.

== Distribution ==
This species occurs in the Indian Ocean off Madagascar and Mauritius, and in the Pacific Ocean off Taiwan, New Caledonia and Northeast Australia.
