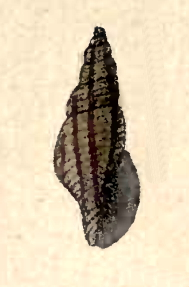
- Shell of Daphnella varicosa

Scientific classification
- Kingdom: Animalia
- Phylum: Mollusca
- Class: Gastropoda
- Subclass: Caenogastropoda
- Order: Neogastropoda
- Superfamily: Conoidea
- Family: Raphitomidae
- Genus: Daphnella
- Species: D. varicosa

Binomial name
- Daphnella varicosa (Souverbie & Montrozier, 1874)

Synonyms
- Pleurotoma varicosa Souverbie & Montrozier, 1874

= Daphnella varicosa =

Species of gastropod

Daphnella varicosa is a species of sea snail, a marine gastropod mollusk in the family Raphitomidae.

The variety Daphnella varicosa var. subrissoides Hervier, 1897 is a synonym of Tritonoturris subrissoides (Hervier, 1897) (basionym)

== Description ==
The length of the shell varies between 8 mm and 16 mm.

The shell is finely reticulated by growth and revolving striae, with larger spiral lirae, crossed by non-continuous varices. The color of the shell is yellowish white, with minute white markings on the spiral ridges, and a large brown spot on the back of the body whorl apparent also within the aperture.

== Distribution ==
This marine species occurs off Taiwan, the Loyalty Islands, New Caledonia and Hawaii
