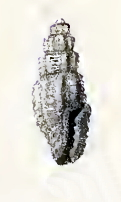
- Original image of a shell of Mangelia orophoma

Scientific classification
- Kingdom: Animalia
- Phylum: Mollusca
- Class: Gastropoda
- Subclass: Caenogastropoda
- Order: Neogastropoda
- Superfamily: Conoidea
- Family: Mangeliidae
- Genus: Mangelia
- Species: M. orophoma

Binomial name
- Mangelia orophoma Melvill, J.C. & R. Standen, 1897, "1896"

Synonyms
- Exomilus perangulata Hervier, 1897; Mangilia orophoma Melvill, J.C. & R. Standen, 1897, "1896" (original combination)

= Mangelia orophoma =

Species of gastropod

Mangelia orophoma is a species of sea snail, a marine gastropod mollusk in the family Mangeliidae.

== Description ==
The length of this very rare shell attains 3 mm, its diameter 1.25 mm.

(Original description) This is a minute turreted pale brown species. The shell contains six whorls, angled just below the sutures, then straight. The straight longitudinal ribs, few in number, are crossed by lirae, conspicuous and large for the size of the shell, six at the penultimate whorl, nine on the body whorl, and less in proportion (e.g. four in the antepenultimate) on the other whorls. The aperture is narrow. The sinus is large and hollowing across the outer lip; which is somewhat thickened and obscurely toothed within.

== Distribution ==
This marine species occurs off the Loyalty Islands and off Mactan Island, Philippines
