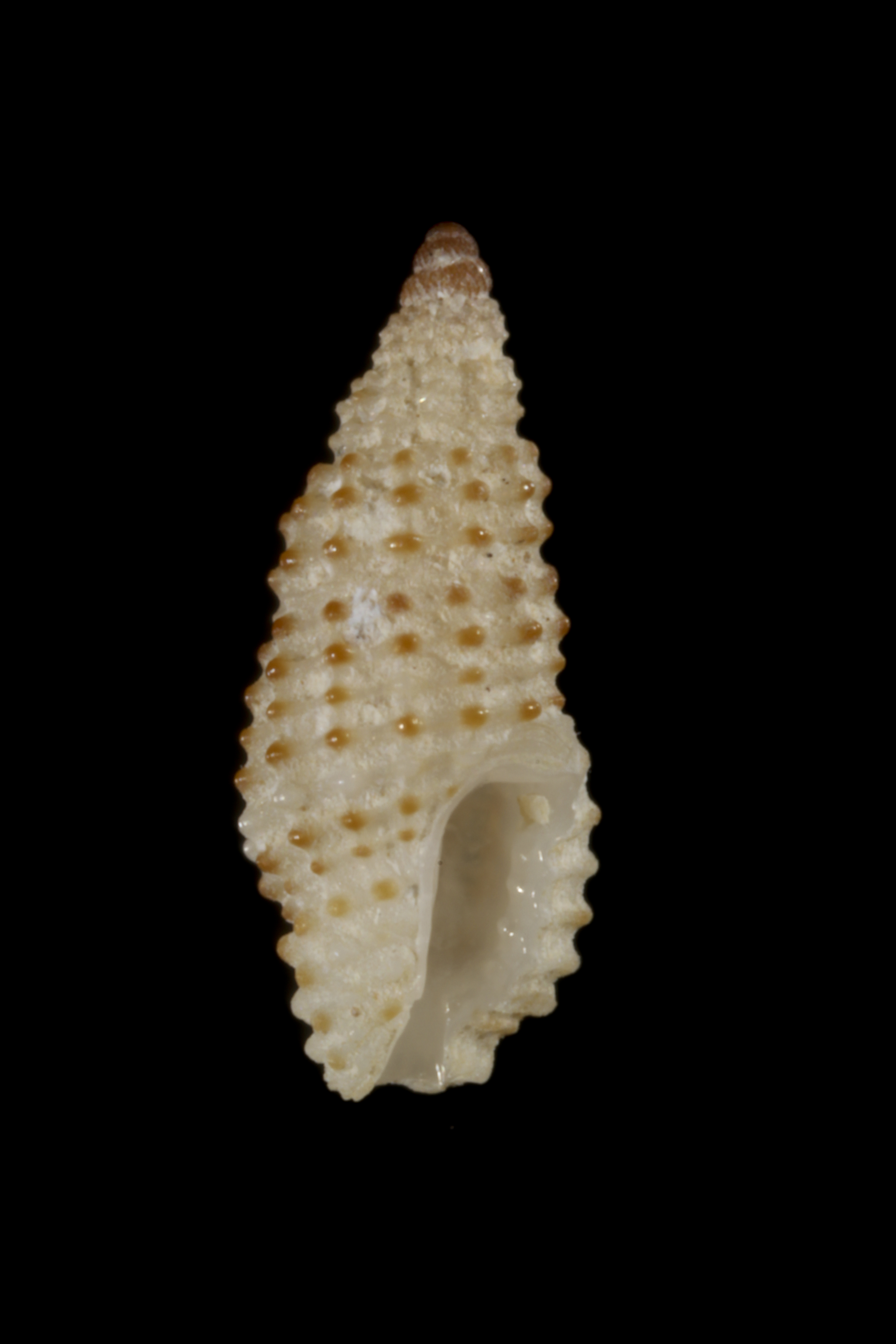
- Shell of Pseudodaphnella punctifera (specimen at MNHN, Paris)

Scientific classification
- Kingdom: Animalia
- Phylum: Mollusca
- Class: Gastropoda
- Subclass: Caenogastropoda
- Order: Neogastropoda
- Superfamily: Conoidea
- Family: Raphitomidae
- Genus: Pseudodaphnella
- Species: P. punctifera

Binomial name
- Pseudodaphnella punctifera (Garrett, 1873)

Synonyms
- Clathurella birtsi Preston, 1908; Clathurella punctifera Garrett, 1873 (original combination); Kermia chrysolitha (Melvill & Standen, 1896); Kermia punctifera (Garrett, 1873); Mangilia chrysolitha Melvill & Standen, 1896; Pleurotomoides punctifera (Garrett, 1873)

= Pseudodaphnella punctifera =

Species of gastropod

Pseudodaphnella punctifera is a species of sea snail, a marine gastropod mollusk in the family Raphitomidae.

== Description ==
The length of the shell attains 5 mm.

The ribs are small, narrower than their interstices and number ten to eleven on the body whorl. They are crossed by smaller transverse ridges. The granules of the intersection are light brown, the rest of the shell is cinereous. The sinus is rather large and semicircular. The outer lip is six-toothed within.

== Distribution ==
This marine species occurs from the Gulf of Carpentaria to Queensland, Australia; widely distributed in the Indo-Pacific.
