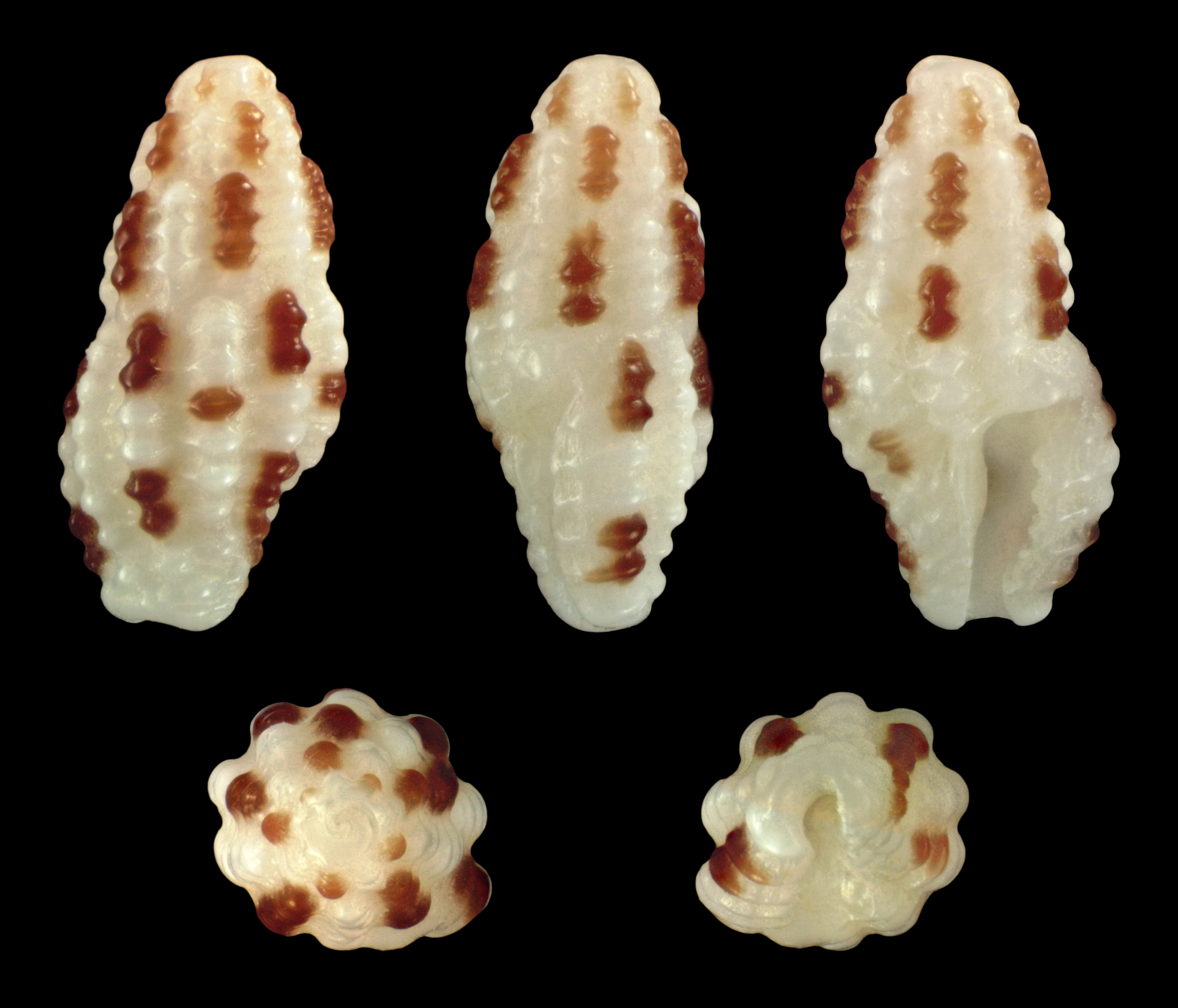
- Shell of Pseudodaphnella barnardi

Scientific classification
- Kingdom: Animalia
- Phylum: Mollusca
- Class: Gastropoda
- Subclass: Caenogastropoda
- Order: Neogastropoda
- Superfamily: Conoidea
- Family: Raphitomidae
- Genus: Pseudodaphnella
- Species: P. barnardi

Binomial name
- Pseudodaphnella barnardi (Brazier, 1876)

Synonyms
- Clathurella barnardi Brazier, 1876; Clathurella chichijimana Pilsbry, H.A. 1904; Clathurella tessellata var. luteopicta Bouge & Dautzenberg, 1914; Kermia barnardi (Brazier, 1876); Kermia tessellata Bouge & Dautzenberg, 1914; Philbertia barnardi (Brazier, 1876); Philbertia (Kermia) barnardi Cernohorsky, 1978; Philbertia dichroma Sturany, 1903

= Pseudodaphnella barnardi =

Species of gastropod

Pseudodaphnella barnardi is a species of sea snail, a marine gastropod mollusk in the family Raphitomidae.

It was assigned to Pseudodaphnella by Chang, 2001.

== Description ==
The length of the shell varies between 3 mm and 7 mm.

(Original description) The shell is somewhat fusiformly ovate. It is longitudinally stoutly ribbed every alternate black and white and latticed with fine transverse ridges. The interstices are shallow. The shell contains 8 whorls, slightly rounded. The suture is deepand smooth. The spire is acuminated. The apex is acute, brown and granulated. The outer lip is thickened, white and black behind. The sinus is wide, above thickened and shallow. The siphonal canal is slightly recurved.

== Distribution ==
This marine occurs off the Gulf of Carpentaria to Queensland, Australia; the Philippines
