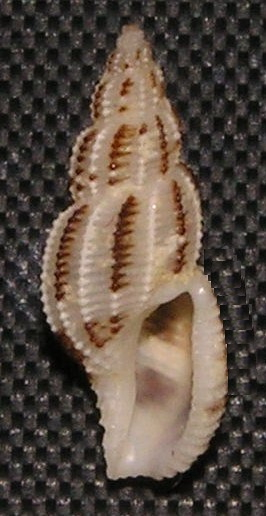
- Shell of Pseudodaphnella philippinensis

Scientific classification
- Kingdom: Animalia
- Phylum: Mollusca
- Class: Gastropoda
- Subclass: Caenogastropoda
- Order: Neogastropoda
- Superfamily: Conoidea
- Family: Raphitomidae
- Genus: Pseudodaphnella; Boettger, 1895

Type species
- Pleurotoma philippinensis Reeve, 1843

Species
- See text

Synonyms
- Qii Chang, 1995

= Pseudodaphnella =

Genus of gastropods

Pseudodaphnella is a genus of sea snails, marine gastropod mollusks in the family Raphitomidae.

In the past this generic name, Pseudodaphnella, has been refused recognition by most modern writers, who have distributed its constituents among Mangilia, Clathurella, or Daphnella.

This genus has a morphological close relationship to Kermia. Together they form a homogeneous complex. Both are also close to the conoidean genera Exomilus Hedley, 1918, Paramontana Laseron, 1954 and Thetidos Hedley, 1899

== Description ==
(Original description) The species that the author includes in this group differ from the real Clathurella by the slightly less deep, in front as well as behind the same section, the wide aperture with a short siphonal canal and the more regular, finer or coarser grid often predominating in the spiral sculpture. The outer lip is simple, showing fine wrinkles. This section differs sharply from Daphnella through the deep V-line. It is also related to the European section of Cordieria Monteros and to the fossil group Homotoma Bell. The coloring is almost always a mixture of white and reddish yellow or reddish brown. As a type species the author takes Pleurotoma philippinensis.

(Description by Charles Hedley) The size is rather large. The colour may be various shades of brown or yellow, disposed often in dots on a white, sometimes opaque, ground. There is a small brown mucronate apex of two or three whorls, the first spirally engraved, the next with oblique lattice lines. The adult shell is netted over by elevate spirals and radials enclosing deep oblong meshes. At the points of intersection are small sharp cusps. The aperture is wide and free from tubercles or plications on the columella side, and generally without a varix. The sinus is subsutural, broad, and shallow. There is no fasciole band distinguishable.

== Distribution ==
Species of this genus occur in shallow waters of the tropical Indo-Pacific and Australia. The genus is associated with reef corals, and has a habit of sheltering under loose stones between tide marks.

== Species ==
Species within the genus Pseudodaphnella include:

- Pseudodaphnella alternans (E. A. Smith, 1882)
- Pseudodaphnella attenuata Hedley, 1922
- Pseudodaphnella aureotincta (Hervier, 1897)
- Pseudodaphnella barnardi (Brazier, 1876)
- Pseudodaphnella boholensis Fedosov & Puillandre, 2012
- Pseudodaphnella cnephaea (Melvill & Standen, 1896)
- Pseudodaphnella crasselirata (Hervier, 1897)
- Pseudodaphnella crypta Fedosov & Puillandre, 2012
- Pseudodaphnella daedala (Reeve, 1846)
- Pseudodaphnella dichroma (Sturany, 1903)
- Pseudodaphnella epicharis (Sturany, 1903)
- Pseudodaphnella excellens (Sowerby III, 1913)
- Pseudodaphnella fallax Fedosov & Puillandre, 2012
- Pseudodaphnella gealei (Smith E.A., 1882)
- Pseudodaphnella granicostata (Reeve, 1846)
- Pseudodaphnella hadfieldi (Melvill & Standen, 1895)
- Pseudodaphnella infrasulcata (Garrett, 1873)
- Pseudodaphnella intaminata (Gould, 1860)
- Pseudodaphnella kilburni Fedosov & Puillandre, 2012
- Pseudodaphnella lemniscata (G. Nevill & H. Nevill, 1869)
- Pseudodaphnella leuckarti (Dunker, 1860)
- Pseudodaphnella lineata Fedosov & Puillandre, 2012
- Pseudodaphnella lucida (E. A. Smith, 1884)
- Pseudodaphnella martensi (G. Nevill & H. Nevill, 1875)
- Pseudodaphnella nebulosa (Pease, 1860)
- Pseudodaphnella nexa (Reeve, 1845)
- Pseudodaphnella nodorete (May, 1916)
- Pseudodaphnella nympha Fedosov & Puillandre, 2012
- Pseudodaphnella oligoina Hedley, 1922
- Pseudodaphnella phaeogranulata Fedosov & Puillandre, 2012
- Pseudodaphnella philippinensis (Reeve, 1843)
- Pseudodaphnella pulchella (Pease, 1860)
- Pseudodaphnella punctifera (Garrett, 1873)
- Pseudodaphnella pustulata (Angas, 1877)
- Pseudodaphnella ramsayi (Brazier, 1876)
- Pseudodaphnella retellaria Hedley, 1922
- Pseudodaphnella rottnestensis Cotton, 1947
- Pseudodaphnella rubroguttata (H. Adams, 1872)
- Pseudodaphnella rufolirata (Hervier, 1897)
- Pseudodaphnella santoa Fedosov & Puillandre, 2012
- Pseudodaphnella sonjae Raines, 2024
- Pseudodaphnella spyridula (Melvill & Standen, 1896)
- Pseudodaphnella stipata Hedley, 1922
- Pseudodaphnella sudafricana Fedosov & Puillandre, 2012
- Pseudodaphnella tincta (Reeve, 1846)
- Pseudodaphnella variegata Fedosov & Puillandre, 2012
- Pseudodaphnella virgo (Schepman, 1913)

Species brought into synonymy

- Pseudodaphnella albifuniculata Reeve, 1846: synonym of Pseudodaphnella tincta (Reeve, 1846)
- Pseudodaphnella caelata Garrett 1873: synonym of Lienardia caelata (Garrett, 1873)
- Pseudodaphnella canistra Hedley, 1922: synonym of Kermia canistra (Hedley, 1922)
- Pseudodaphnella cavernosa (Reeve, 1845): synonym of Kermia cavernosa (Reeve, 1845)
- Pseudodaphnella centrosa Pilsbry, 1904 : synonym of Pseudodaphnella tincta (Reeve, 1846)
- Pseudodaphnella corrugata Carpenter, 1865: synonym of Pseudodaphnella nebulosa (Pease, 1860)
- Pseudodaphnella corrugata Dunker, 1871 : synonym of Pseudodaphnella tincta (Reeve, 1846)
- Pseudodaphnella decaryi (Dautzenberg 1932): synonym of Mangelia decaryi Dautzenberg, 1932
- Pseudodaphnella ephela Hervier, R.P.J., 1897: synonym of Pseudodaphnella hadfieldi (Melvill & Standen, 1895)
- Pseudodaphnella episema (Melvill & Standen, 1896): synonym of Kermia episema (Melvill & Standen, 1896)
- Pseudodaphnella exilis Pease 1860 : synonym of Paramontana exilis (Pease, 1860)
- Pseudodaphnella fusoides (Reeve, 1843): synonym of Paraclathurella gracilenta (Reeve, 1843)
- Pseudodaphnella granicosta Reeve, 1846: synonym of Pseudodaphnella granicostata (Reeve, 1846)
- Pseudodaphnella granosa (Dunker 1871): synonym of Kermia granosa (Dunker, 1871)
- Pseudodaphnella harenula Hedley, 1922: synonym of Kermia harenula (Hedley, 1922)
- Pseudodaphnella iospira Hervier, 1897: synonym of Hemilienardia iospira (Hervier, 1896)
- Pseudodaphnella maculosa (Pease, 1860): synonym of Daphnella ornata R.B. Hinds, 1844
- Pseudodaphnella mayana Hedley, 1922: synonym of Paramontana mayana (Hedley, 1922)
- Pseudodaphnella modesta (Angas, 1877): synonym of Paramontana modesta (Angas, 1877)
- Pseudodaphnella phaedra (Hervier, 1897): synonym of Kermia daedalea (Garrett, 1873)
- Pseudodaphnella punicea Hedley, 1922: synonym of Paramontana punicea (Hedley, 1922 )
- Pseudodaphnella rufinodis Von Martens, 1880: synonym of Pseudodaphnella granicostata (Reeve, 1846)
- Pseudodaphnella rufozonata Angas, 1877: synonym of Paramontana rufozonata (Angas, 1877)
- Pseudodaphnella tessellata (Hinds, 1843): synonym of Kermia tessellata (Hinds, 1843)
