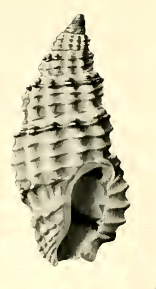
- Shell of Pseudodaphnella ramsayi; the crooked spire of this specimen is an individual deformity

Scientific classification
- Kingdom: Animalia
- Phylum: Mollusca
- Class: Gastropoda
- Subclass: Caenogastropoda
- Order: Neogastropoda
- Superfamily: Conoidea
- Family: Raphitomidae
- Genus: Pseudodaphnella
- Species: P. ramsayi

Binomial name
- Pseudodaphnella ramsayi (Brazier, 1876)

Synonyms
- Clathurella ramsayi Brazier, 1876

= Pseudodaphnella ramsayi =

Species of gastropod

Pseudodaphnella ramsayi is a species of sea snail, a marine gastropod mollusk in the family Raphitomidae.

== Description ==
The white shell is oblong ovate, somewhat acuminated, longitudinally closely ribbed, corded with fine transverse ridges. The interstices are deep. The shell contains six flat whorls, encircled at the suture with black, showing plainer on the back of the body whorl. The brown apex is acute. The outer lip is thickened. The sinus is narrow. The siphonal canal is a little recurved.

A peculiar wide basal furrow groups Pseudodaphnella ramsayi with such species as Philbertia alba Deshayes, 1863, Paramontana blanfordi (Nevill & Nevill, 1875), Kermia cavernosa (Reeve, 1843) Pseudodaphnella leuckarti (Dunker, 1860), Paramontana mayana Hedley, 1922 Pseudodaphnella oligoina Hedley, 1922, Kermia spelaeodea Hervier, 1897, Pseudodaphnella stipata Hedley, 1922 and Pseudodaphnella tincta Reeve, 1846.

== Distribution ==
This marine species occurs off New Guinea and circum Australia.
