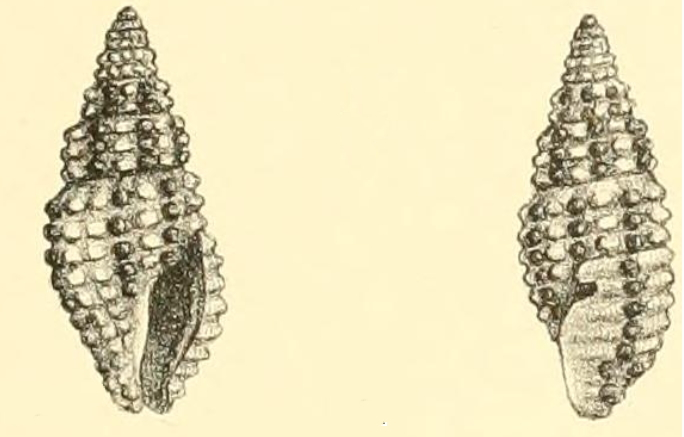
- Shell of Pseudodaphnella dichroma (holotype)

Scientific classification
- Kingdom: Animalia
- Phylum: Mollusca
- Class: Gastropoda
- Subclass: Caenogastropoda
- Order: Neogastropoda
- Superfamily: Conoidea
- Family: Raphitomidae
- Genus: Pseudodaphnella
- Species: P. dichroma

Binomial name
- Pseudodaphnella dichroma (R. Sturany, 1903)

Synonyms
- Clathurella dichroma Sturany, 1903 (original combination)

= Pseudodaphnella dichroma =

Species of gastropod

Pseudodaphnella dichroma is a species of sea snail, a marine gastropod mollusk in the family Raphitomidae.

== Description ==
The length of the shell attains 4.6 mm, its diameter 2 mm.

(Original description in German) This new species, which is represented by only two specimens, shows a great similarity and relationship to Pseudodaphnella rubroguttata (H. Adams, 1872).

The shell consists of eight whorls, the first three of which form a distinct brown apex. This apex is followed by a single whorl of white color, and only after this does the main part of the shell follows, decorated with a dark or reddish-brown coloration.

In this section, the nodes—which are formed at the intersection points of the three longitudinal (spiral) ribs and the transverse ridges—are alternately colored white and reddish-brown. The outer lip of the aperture bears an incision at the top. The aperture is less than half as high as the entire shell.

== Distribution ==
This marine species occurs in the Red Sea.
