= Pseudodaphnella nodorete =

Scientific classification
- Kingdom: Animalia
- Phylum: Mollusca
- Class: Gastropoda
- Subclass: Caenogastropoda
- Order: Neogastropoda
- Family: Raphitomidae
- Genus: Pseudodaphnella
- Species: P. nodorete

Binomial name
- Pseudodaphnella nodorete (May, 1916)

Synonyms
- Clathurella nodorete May, 1916; Paramontana rufozonata nodorete (May, 1916); Pseudaphnella rufozonata nodorete (May, 1916)

Species of gastropod

Pseudodaphnella nodorete is a species of sea snail, a marine gastropod mollusk in the family Raphitomidae.

== Description ==
This species differs slightly from Paramontana rufozonata (Angas, 1877) by a rather larger protoconch and by less prominent sculpture.

== Distribution ==
This marine species occurs off Tasmania, Australia.
