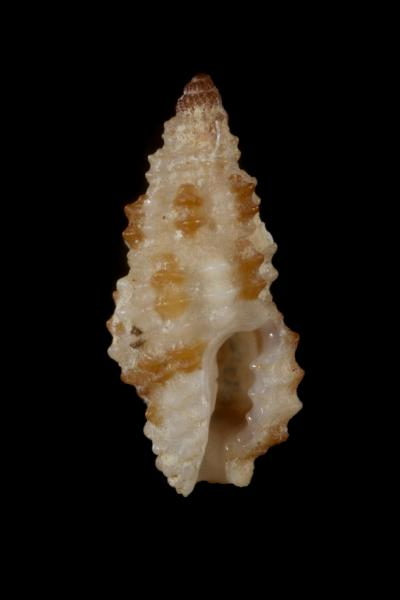
- Shell of Pseudodaphnella aureotincta (syntype at MNHN, Paris)

Scientific classification
- Kingdom: Animalia
- Phylum: Mollusca
- Class: Gastropoda
- Subclass: Caenogastropoda
- Order: Neogastropoda
- Superfamily: Conoidea
- Family: Raphitomidae
- Genus: Pseudodaphnella
- Species: P. aureotincta

Binomial name
- Pseudodaphnella aureotincta (Hervier, 1897)

Synonyms
- Clathurella tincta var. aureotincta Hervier, 1897 (basionym)

= Pseudodaphnella aureotincta =

Species of gastropod

Pseudodaphnella aureotincta is a species of sea snail, a marine gastropod mollusk in the family Raphitomidae.

== Description ==
This is a minor form of Pseudodaphnella tincta (Reeve, 1846). The longitudinal ribs are swollen, with white ribs alternating with golden yellow ribs. The elongate-fusiform shell shows a broader, golden-yellow band in the depression near the siphonal canal.

== Distribution ==
This marine species occurs off New Caledonia.
