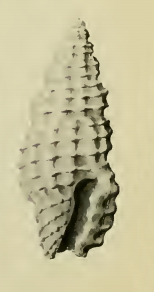
- Paramontana punicea

Scientific classification
- Kingdom: Animalia
- Phylum: Mollusca
- Class: Gastropoda
- Subclass: Caenogastropoda
- Order: Neogastropoda
- Superfamily: Conoidea
- Family: Raphitomidae
- Genus: Paramontana; Laseron, 1954

Type species
- Clathurella modesta Angas, 1877

Species
- See text

= Paramontana =

Genus of gastropods

Paramontana is a small genus of sea snails, marine gastropod mollusks in the family Raphitomidae.

This genus was originally defined solely by the non-planctotrophic protoconch morphology of its species. It should be considered as a synonym of either Kermia or Pseudodaphnella

== Species ==
Species within the genus Paramontana include:

- Paramontana blanfordi (G. Nevill & H. Nevill, 1875)
- Paramontana exilis (Pease, 1860)
- Paramontana fusca Laseron, 1954
- Paramontana mayana (Hedley, 1922)
- Paramontana modesta (Angas, 1877)
- Paramontana punicea (Hedley, 1922)
- Paramontana rufozonata (Angas, 1877)

Species brought into synonymy

- Paramontana oligoina (Hedley, 1922) : synonym of Pseudodaphnella oligoina Hedley, 1922
