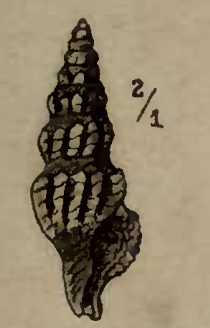
- Clathurella rava

Scientific classification
- Kingdom: Animalia
- Phylum: Mollusca
- Class: Gastropoda
- Subclass: Caenogastropoda
- Order: Neogastropoda
- Family: Clathurellidae
- Genus: Clathurella; Carpenter, 1857

Type species
- Clavatula rava Hinds, 1843

Species
- See text

Synonyms
- Defrancia Millet, 1826 (preoccupied); Pleurotoma (Clathurella)

= Clathurella =

Genus of gastropods

Clathurella is a genus of sea snails, marine gastropod mollusks in the family Clathurellidae.

== Description ==
The shell is fusiform or turriculated. The columella lip has no callosity, except a small posterior tooth. There is no operculum. The surface is cancellated and has a more ventricose form, and a more evident siphonal canal. This distinguishes it from Mangelia; the emargination of the outer lip from Clavatula; the texture and sculpture of the surface from Bela and Daphnella.

== Species ==
Species within the genus Clathurella include:

- Clathurella aubryana (Hervier, 1896)
- Clathurella canfieldi Dall, 1871
- Clathurella capaniola (Dall, 1919)
- Clathurella clarocincta (Boettger, 1895)
- Clathurella colombi Stahlschmidt, Poppe & Tagaro, 2018
- Clathurella crassilirata E. A. Smith, 1904
- Clathurella eversoni Tippett, 1995
- Clathurella extenuata (Dall, 1927)
- Clathurella fuscobasis Rehder, 1980
- Clathurella grayi (Reeve, 1845)
- Clathurella horneana (E. A. Smith, 1884)
- Clathurella leucostigmata (Hervier, 1896)
- Clathurella perdecorata (Dall, 1927)
- Clathurella peristernioides (Schepman, 1913)
- Clathurella pertabulata (Sturany, 1903)
- † Clathurella pierreaimei Ceulemans, Van Dingenen & Landau, 2018
- Clathurella polignaci Lamy, 1923 (taxon inquirendum)
- Clathurella ponsonbyi (G. B. Sowerby III, 1892) (taxon inquirendum)
- Clathurella pseudocolombi Poppe & Tagaro, 2026
- Clathurella rava (Hinds, 1843)
- Clathurella rogersi Melvill & Standen, 1896 (taxon inquirendum)
- Clathurella salarium P. Fischer in Locard, 1897 (taxon inquirendum)
- Clathurella squarrosa Hervier, 1897 (taxon inquirendum)
- Clathurella subquadrata (E. A. Smith, 1888)
- Clathurella verrucosa Stahlschmidt, Poppe & Tagaro, 2018

Species brought into synonymy

- † Clathurella abnormis W.F. Hutton, 1885: synonym of † Antiguraleus abnormis (Hutton, 1885)
- Clathurella albifuniculata (Reeve, 1846): synonym of Kermia albifuniculata (Reeve, 1846)
- Clathurella albovirgulata (Souverbie, 1860): synonym of Asperdaphne albovirgulata (Souverbie, 1860)
- Clathurella clathra Lesson, 1842: synonym of Muricodrupa fenestrata (Blainville, 1832)
- Clathurella conradiana Gabb, 1869: synonym of Crockerella conradiana (Gabb, 1869) (original combination)
- Clathurella crassilirata Hervier, 1897: synonym of Pseudodaphnella crasselirata (Hervier, 1897) (original combination)
- Clathurella enginaeformis G. & H. Nevill, 1875: synonym of Rahitoma enginaeformis (G. & H. Nevill, 1875)
- Clathurella epidelia Duclos in Chenu, 1848: synonym of Maculotriton serriale (Deshayes, 1834)
- Clathurella irretita Hedley, 1899: synonym of Kermia irretita (Hedley, 1899)
- Clathurella maryae McLean & Poorman, 1971: synonym of Etrema maryae (McLean & Poorman, 1971)
- Clathurella pulicaris Lesson, 1842: synonym of Maculotriton serriale (Deshayes, 1834)
- Clathurella rigida (Hinds, 1843): synonym of Lienardia rigida (Hinds, 1843)
- Clathurella tessellata: synonym of Kermia tessellata (Hinds, 1843)
