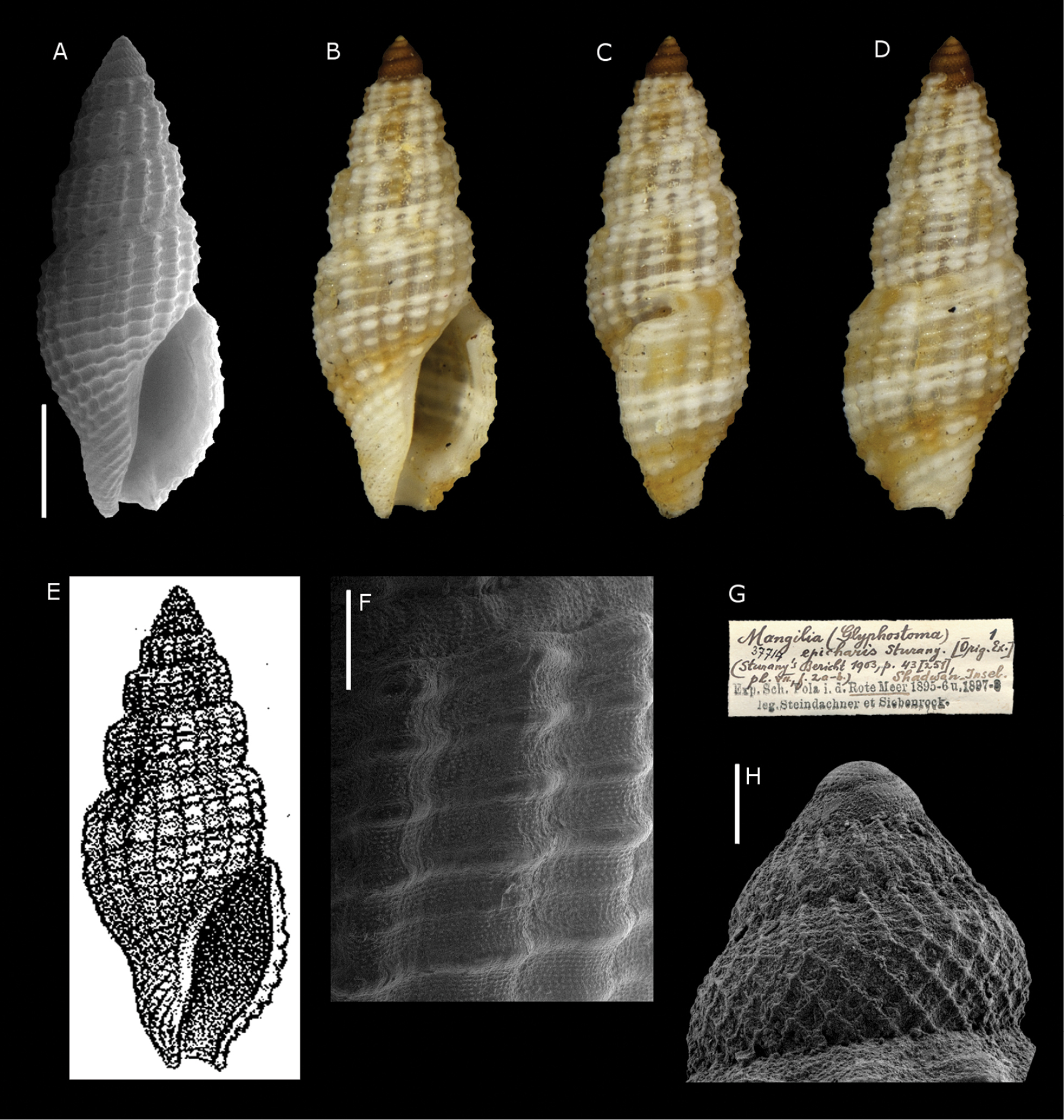

Scientific classification
- Kingdom: Animalia
- Phylum: Mollusca
- Class: Gastropoda
- Subclass: Caenogastropoda
- Order: Neogastropoda
- Superfamily: Conoidea
- Family: Raphitomidae
- Genus: Pseudodaphnella
- Species: P. epicharis

Binomial name
- Pseudodaphnella epicharis (R. Sturany, 1903)

Synonyms
- Mangilia (Glyphostoma) epicharis R. Sturany, 1903; Mangilia epicharis Sturany, 1903 (original combination)

= Pseudodaphnella epicharis =

Species of gastropod

Pseudodaphnella epicharis is a species of sea snail, a marine gastropod mollusk in the family Raphitomidae. It was originally described by Rudolf Sturany in 1903 as Mangilia (Glyphostoma) epicharis.

== Taxonomy ==
The species was originally described as Mangilia (Glyphostoma) epicharis by Sturany in 1903.

It is currently placed in the genus Pseudodaphnella within the family Raphitomidae, following subsequent taxonomic revisions.

== Description ==
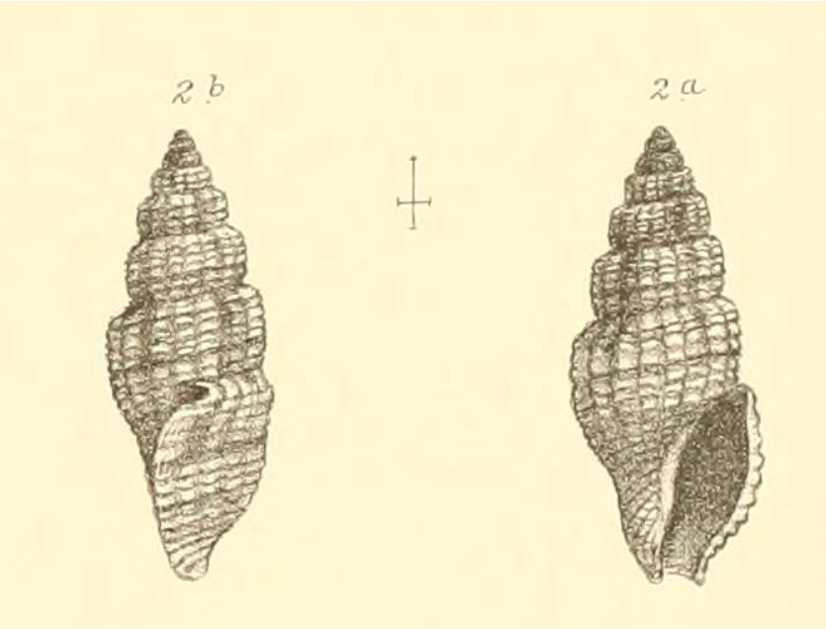
Original illustration of Pseudodaphnella epicharis (as Mangilia (Glyphostoma) epicharis) from Sturany (1903).

The shell is small and slender, attaining a height of approximately 4.6 mm and a width of about 2 mm. The protoconch consists of four whorls and forms a cap-like structure set distinctly upon the teleoconch. Its coloration ranges from yellow to brown; the first two whorls are paler and appear smooth to the naked eye but show extremely fine punctation under magnification. The subsequent protoconch whorls are brownish and ornamented with a lattice-like sculpture formed by obliquely intersecting lines.

The teleoconch comprises about four stepped whorls bearing spiral and axial swellings. The ground color is white, decorated with irregular brown spiral and transverse lines. The suture is moderately impressed but not deeply incised. The overall sculpture gives the shell a finely reticulate appearance.

== Distribution ==
Pseudodaphnella epicharis is known from the Red Sea, where it was originally collected.
