= Pseudodaphnella nympha =

Scientific classification
- Kingdom: Animalia
- Phylum: Mollusca
- Class: Gastropoda
- Subclass: Caenogastropoda
- Order: Neogastropoda
- Superfamily: Conoidea
- Family: Raphitomidae
- Genus: Pseudodaphnella
- Species: P. nympha

Binomial name
- Pseudodaphnella nympha Fedosov & Puillandre, 2012

Species of gastropod

Pseudodaphnella nympha is a species of sea snail, a marine gastropod mollusk in the family Raphitomidae.

== Description ==
The length of the shell varies between 3.9 mm and 6 mm.

== Distribution ==
This marine species occurs off Southern Madagascar.
