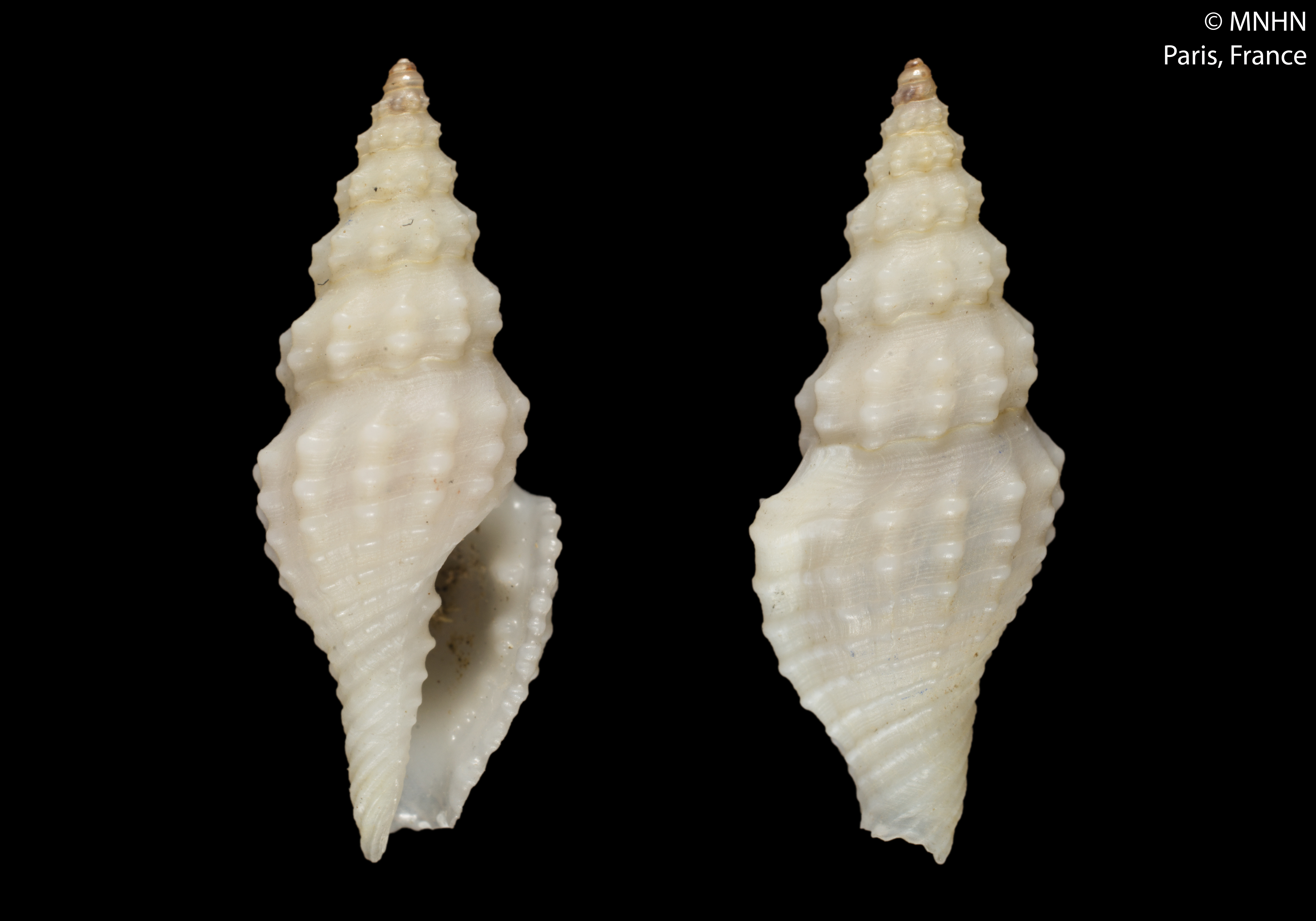
- Shell of Clathurella salarium (syntype at MNHN, Paris)

Scientific classification
- Kingdom: Animalia
- Phylum: Mollusca
- Class: Gastropoda
- Subclass: Caenogastropoda
- Order: Neogastropoda
- Family: Clathurellidae
- Genus: Clathurella
- Species: C. salarium

Binomial name
- Clathurella salarium P. Fischer in Locard, 1897

= Clathurella salarium =

Species of gastropod

Clathurella salarium is a species of sea snail, a marine gastropod mollusk in the family Clathurellidae. The taxonomic validity of this species is uncertain.

== Description ==
The shell grows to a length of 19 mm.

== Distribution ==
This species occurs in the Atlantic Ocean along the Cape Verde Islands.
