= Pseudodaphnella rottnestensis =

Scientific classification
- Kingdom: Animalia
- Phylum: Mollusca
- Class: Gastropoda
- Subclass: Caenogastropoda
- Order: Neogastropoda
- Superfamily: Conoidea
- Family: Raphitomidae
- Genus: Pseudodaphnella
- Species: P. rottnestensis

Binomial name
- Pseudodaphnella rottnestensis Cotton, 1947

Species of gastropod

Pseudodaphnella rottnestensis is a species of sea snail, a marine gastropod mollusk in the family Raphitomidae.

== Distribution ==
This marine species occurs off Western Australia.
