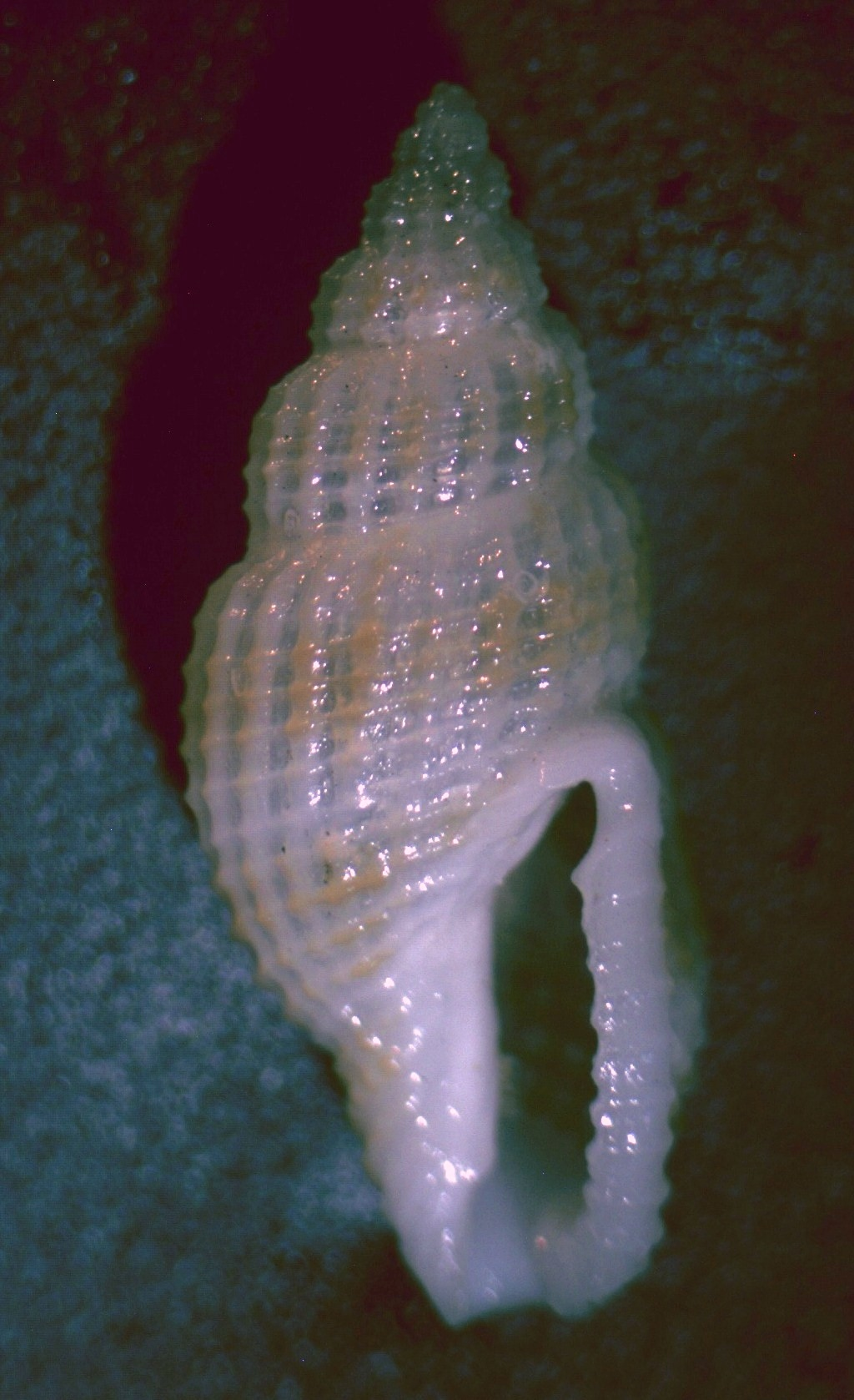
- Shell of Pseudodaphnella nexa

Scientific classification
- Kingdom: Animalia
- Phylum: Mollusca
- Class: Gastropoda
- Subclass: Caenogastropoda
- Order: Neogastropoda
- Superfamily: Conoidea
- Family: Raphitomidae
- Genus: Pseudodaphnella
- Species: P. nexa

Binomial name
- Pseudodaphnella nexa (Reeve, 1845)

Synonyms
- Pleurotoma nexa Reeve, 1845; Pseudodaphnella nexa albotaeniata Bouge & Dautzenberg, 1914

= Pseudodaphnella nexa =

Species of gastropod

Pseudodaphnella nexa is a species of sea snail, a marine gastropod mollusk in the family Raphitomidae.

== Description ==
The length of the shell varies between 10 mm and 20 mm.

The whorls are rounded, plicately ribbed, encircled with fine narrow cords, becoming nodulous on crossing the ribs. The outer lip is flattened. The sinus is broad-whitish, stained with chestnut. The cords are darker chestnut or chocolate.

== Distribution ==
This marine species occurs in the Indo-West Pacific and off India, the Philippines, Christmas Island and in the China Seas and off Queensland, Australia.
