= Pseudodaphnella nebulosa =

Scientific classification
- Kingdom: Animalia
- Phylum: Mollusca
- Class: Gastropoda
- Subclass: Caenogastropoda
- Order: Neogastropoda
- Superfamily: Conoidea
- Family: Raphitomidae
- Genus: Pseudodaphnella
- Species: P. nebulosa

Binomial name
- Pseudodaphnella nebulosa (Pease, 1860)

Species of gastropod

Pseudodaphnella nebulosa is a species of sea snail, a marine gastropod mollusk in the family Raphitomidae.

== Description ==
(Original description) The shell is fusiformly oblong, finely ribbed longitudinally, striated transversely, forming regular granules. The sutures are slightly angulated and smooth. The aperture is oval. The outer lip is slightly incurved and serrated on its edges, striated internally. The siphonal canal is slightly produced and recurved. The colour of the shell is white, marked with irregular, interrupted, longitudinal brown lines.

== Distribution ==
This marine species occurs off Hawaii.
