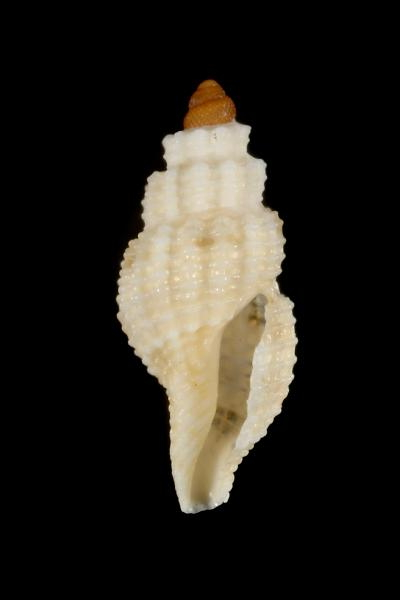
- Original image of a shell of Pseudodaphnella retellaria

Scientific classification
- Kingdom: Animalia
- Phylum: Mollusca
- Class: Gastropoda
- Subclass: Caenogastropoda
- Order: Neogastropoda
- Superfamily: Conoidea
- Family: Raphitomidae
- Genus: Pseudodaphnella
- Species: P. retellaria

Binomial name
- Pseudodaphnella retellaria Hedley, 1922

Synonyms
- Clathurella languida Brazier, 1876; Kermia retellaria (Hedley, 1922)

= Pseudodaphnella retellaria =

Species of gastropod

Pseudodaphnella retellaria is a species of sea snail, a marine gastropod mollusk in the family Raphitomidae.

== Description ==
The length of the shell attains 6 mm, its diameter 2.3 mm.

(Original description) The small shell is lanceolate, subturreted and thin. Its colour is dull white, with a few brown spots on the shoulder, and the apex brown. It contains 8 whorls, including a protoconch of 3½ whorls.

The sculpture is harsher on the earlier whorls. The radials are narrow, almost lamellate, ending abruptly at the shoulder and gradually on the base, slightly oblique, fourteen widely spaced on the body whorl and on the penultimate sixteen. These are crossed by spiral threads of smaller gauge, forming long narrow meshes, amounting to sixteen on the body whorl and to six on the penultimate. The fasciole is flat, only incised by crescentic growth lines. The aperture is ovate. The outer lip forms a small varix, ascending the previous whorl and enclosing a C-shaped sinus. The outer lip is dentate at the margin and tuberculate within. The siphonal canal is short and wide.

== Distribution ==
This marine species is endemic to Australia and occurs off Queensland; also off Papua New Guinea.
