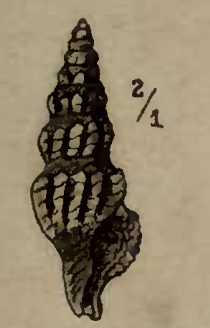
- Drawing of Clathurella rava

Scientific classification
- Kingdom: Animalia
- Phylum: Mollusca
- Class: Gastropoda
- Subclass: Caenogastropoda
- Order: Neogastropoda
- Family: Clathurellidae
- Genus: Clathurella
- Species: C. rava

Binomial name
- Clathurella rava (Hinds, 1843)

Synonyms
- Clathurella serrata Carpenter, P.P., 1856; Clavatula rava Hinds, 1843; Philbertia telamon Dall, W.H., 1919

= Clathurella rava =

Species of gastropod

Clathurella rava is a species of sea snail, a marine gastropod mollusk in the family Clathurellidae.

== Description ==
The size of an adult shell varies between 8 mm and 10 mm. The color of the shell is fulvous. The interstices of the ribs and the edge of the lip are stained purple-red. The anal sinus is wide and deep.

== Distribution ==
This species occurs in the Pacific Ocean in the Gulf of California, Mexico and along Nicaragua, Costa Rica and Panama.
