= Clathurella fuscobasis =

Scientific classification
- Kingdom: Animalia
- Phylum: Mollusca
- Class: Gastropoda
- Subclass: Caenogastropoda
- Order: Neogastropoda
- Family: Clathurellidae
- Genus: Clathurella
- Species: C. fuscobasis

Binomial name
- Clathurella fuscobasis Rehder, 1980

Species of gastropod

Clathurella fuscobasis is a species of sea snail, a marine gastropod mollusk in the family Clathurellidae.

== Distribution ==
This species occurs in the Pacific Ocean along Easter Island.
