= Pseudodaphnella gealei =

Scientific classification
- Kingdom: Animalia
- Phylum: Mollusca
- Class: Gastropoda
- Subclass: Caenogastropoda
- Order: Neogastropoda
- Superfamily: Conoidea
- Family: Raphitomidae
- Genus: Pseudodaphnella
- Species: P. gealei

Binomial name
- Pseudodaphnella gealei (E. A. Smith, 1882)

Synonyms
- Pleurotoma (Daphnella) gealei E. A. Smith, 1882 (original combination)

Species of gastropod

Pseudodaphnella gealei is a species of sea snail, a marine gastropod mollusk in the family Raphitomidae.

== Description ==
The length of the shell attains 14 mm, its diameter 5⅓ mm.

The ovately turreted shell is white with yellowish brown ribs (of which one is white). The body whorl is encircled by a white line. The back of the outer lip shows a brown spot. The granules on the cauda are large and are alternately white and pale brown.

The shell contains probably 10 whorls (the apex is broken off). The remaining whorls of the protoconch are spirally striated. The next whorls are somewhat convex below. The adult shell is netted over by 8 elevate spirals (17 in the body whorl) and radials enclosing deep oblong meshes. The shell shows almost 11 straight ribs (continuing to the base of the shell in the body whorl). The aperture measures 2/5 of the total length. The columella is slightly callous on its top and has a flattened form. The outer lip is incrassate at the last rib and has inwardly 10 lirate teeth. The sinus close to the suture is slightly emarginate. The short siphonal canal is narrow and truncate.
