= Clathurella capaniola =

Scientific classification
- Kingdom: Animalia
- Phylum: Mollusca
- Class: Gastropoda
- Subclass: Caenogastropoda
- Order: Neogastropoda
- Family: Clathurellidae
- Genus: Clathurella
- Species: C. capaniola

Binomial name
- Clathurella capaniola (Dall, 1919)

Synonyms
- Philbertia capaniola Dall, 1919

Species of gastropod

Clathurella capaniola is a species of sea snail, a marine gastropod mollusk in the family Clathurellidae.

== Distribution ==
This species occurs in the Pacific Ocean along California, USA.
