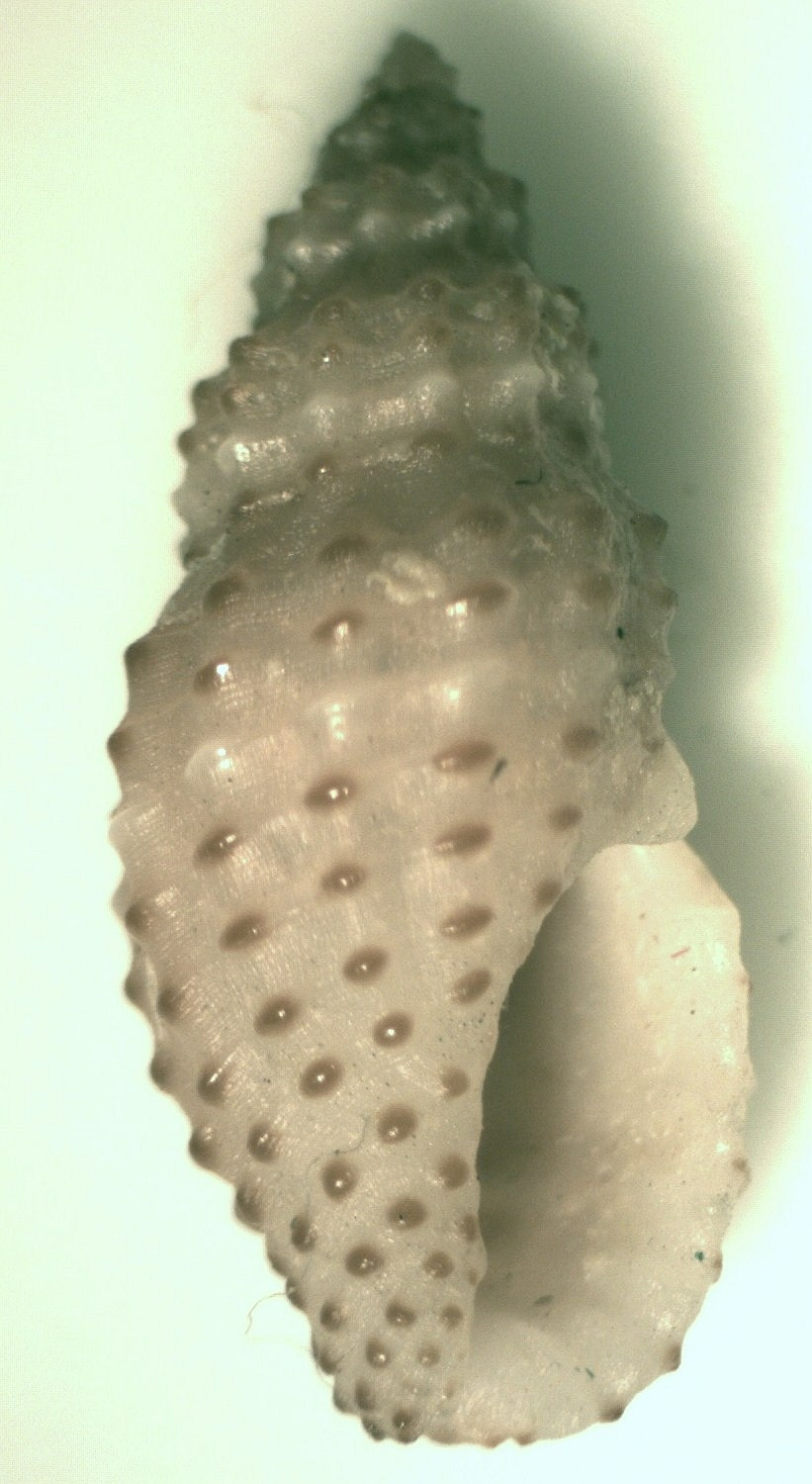
- Apertural view of a shell of Pseudodaphnella granicostata

Scientific classification
- Kingdom: Animalia
- Phylum: Mollusca
- Class: Gastropoda
- Subclass: Caenogastropoda
- Order: Neogastropoda
- Superfamily: Conoidea
- Family: Raphitomidae
- Genus: Pseudodaphnella
- Species: P. granicostata

Binomial name
- Pseudodaphnella granicostata (Reeve, 1846)

Synonyms
- Clathurella rufinodis Martens, 1880; Clathurella (Pseudodaphnella) granicostata (Reeve, 1846); Defrancia granicostata (Reeve, 1846); Mangilia (Defrancia) granicostata (Reeve, 1846); Philbertia granicostata (Reeve, 1846); Philbertia (Pseudodaphnella) granicostata (Reeve, 1846); Pleurotoma granicostata Reeve, 1846; Pleurotomoides granicostata (Reeve, 1846) (original combination); Pseudodaphnella granicosta Reeve, 1846; Pseudodaphnella rufinodis Von Martens, 1880

= Pseudodaphnella granicostata =

Species of gastropod

Pseudodaphnella granicostata is a species of sea snail, a marine gastropod mollusk in the family Raphitomidae.

== Description ==
The length of the shell varies between 8 mm and 13 mm.

The shell is yellowish or blush-brown, with a white band above the middle, the nodules darker-colored.

== Distribution ==
This marine species occurs in the Pacific Ocean; also off Mauritius, Madagascar, the Cocos Keeling Islands, the Cook Islands, the Fiji Islands, Samoa, the Philippines, Taiwan and Queensland, Australia.
