= Pseudodaphnella daedala =

Scientific classification
- Kingdom: Animalia
- Phylum: Mollusca
- Class: Gastropoda
- Subclass: Caenogastropoda
- Order: Neogastropoda
- Family: Raphitomidae
- Genus: Pseudodaphnella
- Species: P. daedala

Binomial name
- Pseudodaphnella daedala (Reeve, 1846)

Synonyms
- Clathurella daedala (Reeve, 1846); Pleurotoma daedala Reeve, 1846

Species of gastropod

Pseudodaphnella daedala is a species of sea snail, a marine gastropod mollusk in the family Raphitomidae.

== Description ==
The length of the shell attains 10 mm.

The whorls are rounded or very slightly shouldered, reticulated by longitudinal and revolving fine ribs and lines. The shell is yellowish brown, tinged with chestnut, sometimes forming an indistinct central band. (described as Mangilia margaritifera, Gray)

== Distribution ==
This marine species is endemic to Australia and occurs off the Gulf of Carpentaria to Queensland, Australia; it also occurs off the Fiji Islands and Singapore.
