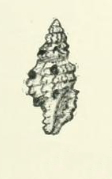
- Original image of a shell of Pseudodaphnella excellens

Scientific classification
- Kingdom: Animalia
- Phylum: Mollusca
- Class: Gastropoda
- Subclass: Caenogastropoda
- Order: Neogastropoda
- Superfamily: Conoidea
- Family: Raphitomidae
- Genus: Pseudodaphnella
- Species: P. excellens

Binomial name
- Pseudodaphnella excellens (Sowerby III, 1913)

Synonyms
- Clathurella excellens Sowerby III, 1913

= Pseudodaphnella excellens =

Species of gastropod

Pseudodaphnella excellens is a species of sea snail, a marine gastropod mollusk in the family Raphitomidae.

== Description ==
The length of the shell attains 14 mm.

A small shell of a striking ovate-turreted character with six whorls. The colour of the shell is white, but the nodules on the eight ribs are quite prominent, mostly of a pale yellow colour, but here and there they are ornamented with conspicuous bright brown blotches, sparingly distributed. The aperture is oblong and narrow. The outer lip is thick and denticulate within. The posterior sinus is slightly deep and has a rounded curvature. The columella is upright, turning slightly to the left. The short siphonal canal is anteriorly expanded.

== Distribution ==
This marine species occurs off Japan and Taiwan, the Cook Islands, Society Islands, Fiji Islands and New Caledonia.
