= Pseudodaphnella lemniscata =

Scientific classification
- Kingdom: Animalia
- Phylum: Mollusca
- Class: Gastropoda
- Subclass: Caenogastropoda
- Order: Neogastropoda
- Superfamily: Conoidea
- Family: Raphitomidae
- Genus: Pseudodaphnella
- Species: P. lemniscata

Binomial name
- Pseudodaphnella lemniscata (G. Nevill & H. Nevill, 1869)

Synonyms
- Mangilia lemniscata (G. Nevill & H. Nevill, 1869); Pleurotoma lemniscata G. Nevill & H. Nevill, 1869 (original combination); Pseudodaphnella tincta lemniscata (G. Nevill & H. Nevill, 1869)

Species of gastropod

Pseudodaphnella lemniscata is a species of sea snail, a marine gastropod mollusk in the family Raphitomidae.

== Description ==
(Original description in Latin) The shell is ovate, with a short spire. There are 8 whorls, which are longitudinally nodose-plicate. It is solid and tawny, banded with ashy (gray) near the suture and the base. It is adorned with 2 chestnut bands on the body whorl. The aperture is strongly crenulated. The outer lip is externally thickened, and the sinus is rounded. The bands are conspicuous internally.

== Distribution ==
This marine species occurs off Sri Lanka, Mauritius and Mindanao, the Philippines.
