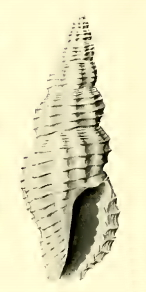
- Original image of a shell of Pseudodaphnella attenuata

Scientific classification
- Kingdom: Animalia
- Phylum: Mollusca
- Class: Gastropoda
- Subclass: Caenogastropoda
- Order: Neogastropoda
- Superfamily: Conoidea
- Family: Raphitomidae
- Genus: Pseudodaphnella
- Species: P. attenuata

Binomial name
- Pseudodaphnella attenuata Hedley, 1922

= Pseudodaphnella attenuata =

Species of gastropod

Pseudodaphnella attenuata is a species of sea snail, a marine gastropod mollusk in the family Raphitomidae.

== Description ==
The length of the shell attains 11 mm, its diameter 4 mm.

(Original description) The lanceolate shell is rather solid and tall. Its colour is uniform yellow. There are seven whorls remaining.

Sculpture:—Large deep meshes are formed on the body of the shell by the intersection of the main sculpture. The ribs are nine on the penultimate and eleven on the body whorl. They are elevated, perpendicular, alternating from whorl to whorl, twice their breadth apart, vanishing on the base and below the suture. The spirals are sharp, elevated cords, thirteen on the body whorl, three on the penultimate, overriding the ribs. On the snout the ribs only survive as nodules. Along the fasciole area the spirals are entirely different, being three or four closely packed threads. The aperture is wide . The varix is taller and broader than the ribs. There are seven small denticules within the outer lip. The sinus is small and semicircular. The siphonal canal is short and wide.

== Distribution ==
This marine species is endemic to Australia and occurs off Queensland
