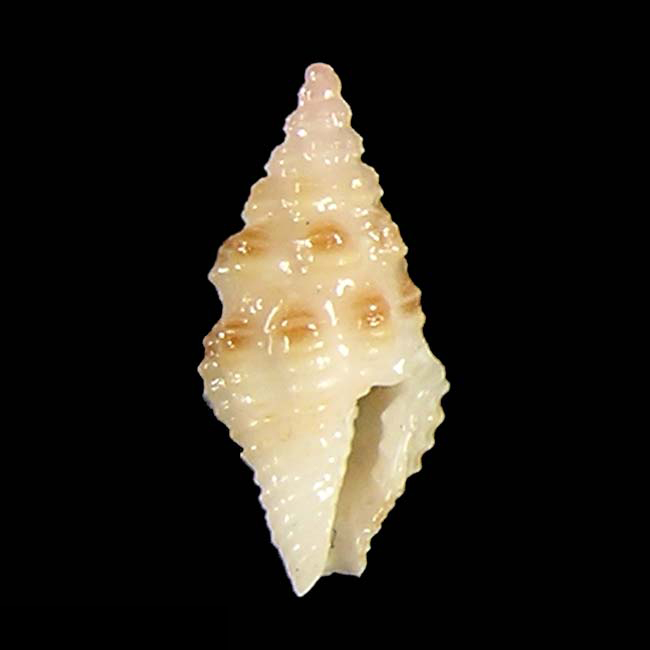

Scientific classification
- Kingdom: Animalia
- Phylum: Mollusca
- Class: Gastropoda
- Subclass: Caenogastropoda
- Order: Neogastropoda
- Family: Clathurellidae
- Genus: Clathurella
- Species: C. verrucosa

Binomial name
- Clathurella verrucosa Stahlschmidt, Poppe & Tagaro, 2018

= Clathurella verrucosa =

Species of gastropod

Clathurella verrucosa is a species of sea snail, a marine gastropod mollusk in the family Clathurellidae.

== Original description ==
- Stahlschmidt P., Poppe G.T. & Tagaro S.P. (2018). Descriptions of remarkable new turrid species from the Philippines. Visaya. 5(1): 5-64.

page(s): 8, pl. 3 figs 1–2.
