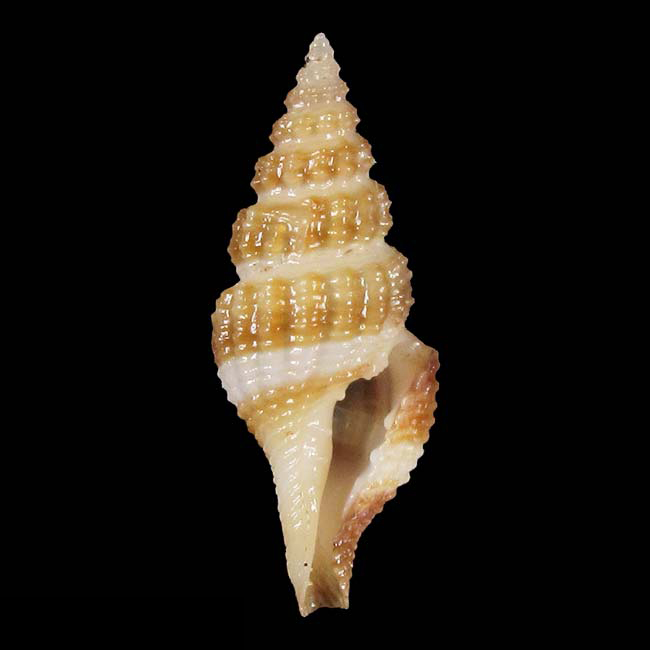

Scientific classification
- Kingdom: Animalia
- Phylum: Mollusca
- Class: Gastropoda
- Subclass: Caenogastropoda
- Order: Neogastropoda
- Family: Clathurellidae
- Genus: Clathurella
- Species: C. colombi

Binomial name
- Clathurella colombi Stahlschmidt, Poppe & Tagaro, 2018

= Clathurella colombi =

Species of gastropod

Clathurella colombi is a species of sea snail, a marine gastropod mollusk in the family Clathurellidae.

== Original description ==
- Stahlschmidt P., Poppe G.T. & Tagaro S.P. (2018). Descriptions of remarkable new turrid species from the Philippines. Visaya. 5(1): 5-64. page(s): 7, pl. 2 figs 1–3.
