= Pseudodaphnella pulchella =

Scientific classification
- Kingdom: Animalia
- Phylum: Mollusca
- Class: Gastropoda
- Subclass: Caenogastropoda
- Order: Neogastropoda
- Superfamily: Conoidea
- Family: Raphitomidae
- Genus: Pseudodaphnella
- Species: P. pulchella

Binomial name
- Pseudodaphnella pulchella (Pease, 1860)

Synonyms
- Clathurella pulchella Pease, 1860

Species of gastropod

Pseudodaphnella pulchella is a species of sea snail, a marine gastropod mollusk in the family Raphitomidae.

This is not Clathurella pulchella Garrett, 1873 (synonym of Hemilienardia purpurascens (Dunker, 1871) )

== Description ==
(Original description) The shell is fusiform, acuminated, shining, longitudinally ribbed, crossed by transverse raised striae. The whorls are rounded. The suture is impressed. The aperture is oval. The siphonal canal is slightly produced aud recurved. The shell is pinkish-white with irregular pink spots over the surface. The apex is red.

== Distribution ==
This marine species occurs off Hawaii.
