= Pseudodaphnella alternans =

Scientific classification
- Kingdom: Animalia
- Phylum: Mollusca
- Class: Gastropoda
- Subclass: Caenogastropoda
- Order: Neogastropoda
- Superfamily: Conoidea
- Family: Raphitomidae
- Genus: Pseudodaphnella
- Species: P. alternans

Binomial name
- Pseudodaphnella alternans (E. A. Smith, 1882)

Synonyms
- Pleurotoma (Defrancia ?) alternans E. A. Smith, 1882 (original combination)

Species of gastropod

Pseudodaphnella alternans is a species of sea snail, a marine gastropod mollusk in the family Raphitomidae.

== Description ==
The length of the shell attains 6 mm, its diameter 2.5 mm.

The ovate shell contains probably 7 whorls (the apex is missing). The 5 remaining whorls are slightly convex and contain 12 longitudinal ribs (continuing to the base of the body whorl). The spiral lirae form small nodules when crossing the ribs (4 in the penultimate whorl, 10 in the body whorl) and are very cancellate. The aperture is very narrow and measures about 3/7 of the total length. The outer lip is incrassate with about 6 denticules within and is somewhat sinuate at the top. The siphonal canal is narrow, short and truncate.

The colouring of this species is very remarkable. In the upper whorls the ribs are alternately brown and white, and the lowest liration, which is in conjunction with the suture and encircles the middle of the body whorl, is wholly white. The fifth and sixth lirations on the last, reckoning from the suture, are rather far apart, and the longitudinal ribs between them are uniformly brown.
