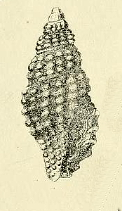
- Original image of a shell of Pseudodaphnella martensi

Scientific classification
- Kingdom: Animalia
- Phylum: Mollusca
- Class: Gastropoda
- Subclass: Caenogastropoda
- Order: Neogastropoda
- Superfamily: Conoidea
- Family: Raphitomidae
- Genus: Pseudodaphnella
- Species: P. martensi

Binomial name
- Pseudodaphnella martensi (G. Nevill & H. Nevill, 1875)

Synonyms
- Clathurella martensi G. Nevill & H. Nevill, 1875 (original combination)

= Pseudodaphnella martensi =

Species of gastropod

Pseudodaphnella martensi is a species of sea snail, a marine gastropod mollusk in the family Raphitomidae.

== Description ==
The length of the shell varies between 4 mm and 5.5 mm.

(Original description) The shell is regularly and conically fusiform, of rather dark brown colour with bright lilac granules. It contains seven rounded whorls, reticulated with very thick somewhat distant ridges, forming at the points of intersection, three rows of large, pearl-like, slightly oblong granules. On the body whorl these three rows of granules are repeated. After the sixth row the shell abruptly becomes contracted, forming an excavated furrow. Near the base there are again six rows of granules, but much smaller and more rounded. These give a somewhat angular appearance to the body whorl. The columella is much contorted, or twisted in the middle. It has a lilac colour, with a few minute denticulations at its edge. The aperture and the four strong denticulations at its outer edge are also of a lilac colour. The sinus is deep and rounded. The outer lip is bright brown, abruptly contracted near its base, forming a strongly marked siphonal canal.

== Distribution ==
This marine species occurs off Sri Lanka and French Polynesia.
