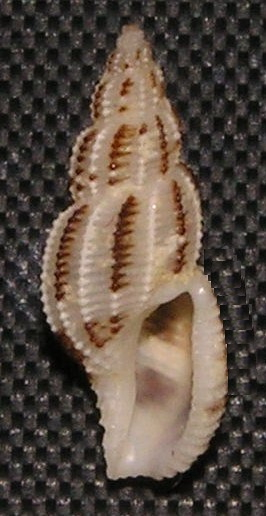
- Shell of Pseudodaphnella philippinensis

Scientific classification
- Kingdom: Animalia
- Phylum: Mollusca
- Class: Gastropoda
- Subclass: Caenogastropoda
- Order: Neogastropoda
- Family: Raphitomidae
- Genus: Pseudodaphnella
- Species: P. philippinensis

Binomial name
- Pseudodaphnella philippinensis (Reeve, 1843)

Synonyms
- Clathurella philippinensis Hervier, 1897; Clathurella philippinensis var. elongata Hervier, 1897; Clathurella philippinensis var. major Hervier, 1897; Mangilia (Defrancia) philippinensis Melvill and Standen, 1895; Philbertia (Pseudodaphnella) philippinensis (Reeve, 1843); Pleurotoma philippinensis Reeve, 1843 (original combination)

= Pseudodaphnella philippinensis =

Species of gastropod

Pseudodaphnella philippinensis, common name the Philippine turrid, is a species of sea snail, a marine gastropod mollusk in the family Raphitomidae.

Subspecies

- Pseudodaphnella philippinensis elongata Hervier, 1897
- Pseudodaphnella philippinensis major Hervier, 1897

== Description ==
The size of the shell varies between 8 mm and 15 mm.

The white shell is ventricose and rather transparent. It is longitudinally ribbed with very delicate ribs, rather compressed, somewhat distant, and variously painted with black or chestnut and opaque-white.

This species is the type of the genus Pseudodaphnella. Hervier has already noticed that it is subject to considerable variation in size, disposition of colour, number of radial ribs, and density of spiral cords, on the body whorl of an example from Cape Grenville Ch. Hedley counted thirty-four spirals. The apex of a shell Ch. Hedley gathered alive at Murray Island is small, brown, and of two whorls, the first finely spirally grooved, the second with numerous close fine radial riblets.

== Distribution ==
This marine species occurs off Taiwan, the Philippines; New Caledonia and Queensland, Australia
