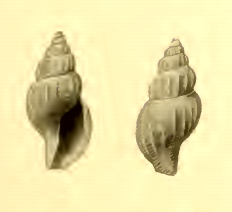
- Original image of a shell of Pseudodaphnella virgo

Scientific classification
- Kingdom: Animalia
- Phylum: Mollusca
- Class: Gastropoda
- Subclass: Caenogastropoda
- Order: Neogastropoda
- Superfamily: Conoidea
- Family: Raphitomidae
- Genus: Pseudodaphnella
- Species: P. virgo

Binomial name
- Pseudodaphnella virgo (Schepman, 1913)

Synonyms
- Clathurella virgo Schepman, 1913

= Pseudodaphnella virgo =

Species of gastropod

Pseudodaphnella virgo is a species of sea snail, a marine gastropod mollusk in the family Raphitomidae.

== Description ==
The snail was originally described by Dutch malacologist Mattheus Marinus Schepman in his 1908 research entitled 'The Prosobranchia of the Siboga Expedition', based on his experiences in the Siboga expedition. He described the species as follows:

The thin, pellucid, white shell is ovate, with a short siphonal canal. It contains 6 whorls, of which 2 convex ones form the protoconch, which is microscopically, spirally lirate and crossed by still finer axial striae, which make the apex cancellated. The subsequent whorls are very convex, separated by a deep suture, accompanied by an excavation of the upper part of whorls. The sculpture consists of rounded axial ribs, narrower than the interstices, 19 in number on the body whorl, ending at the excavation, not reaching the base of the body whorl, and rather sharp, spiral lirae, 10 in number on the penultimate whorl, besides a few much fainter ones in the excavation. Moreover, very fine growth-lines, stronger in the excavation and extremely fine granules, cover the whole shell. The aperture is oval, angular above, below with a short, wide siphonal canal. The peristome is thin, with a rather shallow sinus. The columellar margin is concave above, directed to the left along the siphonal canal, covered with a thin layer of enamel. The interior of the aperture is smooth.

== Distribution ==
This deepwater species occurs in the Sulu Sea, Philippines and off Brunei.
