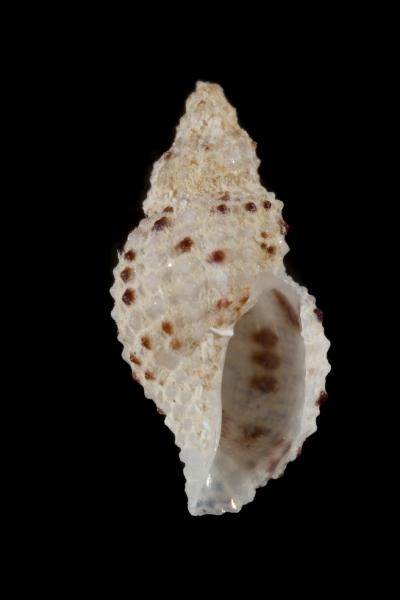
- Original image of a shell of Pseudodaphnella crypta (holotype at MNHN, Paris)

Scientific classification
- Kingdom: Animalia
- Phylum: Mollusca
- Class: Gastropoda
- Subclass: Caenogastropoda
- Order: Neogastropoda
- Superfamily: Conoidea
- Family: Raphitomidae
- Genus: Pseudodaphnella
- Species: P. crypta

Binomial name
- Pseudodaphnella crypta Fedosov & Puillandre, 2012

= Pseudodaphnella crypta =

Species of gastropod

Pseudodaphnella crypta is a species of sea snail, a marine gastropod mollusk in the family Raphitomidae.

== Description ==
The length of the shell attains 8 mm. The shell is off-white and very rigid to the touch with brown spots lining the shell on both the outside and the inside.

== Distribution ==
This marine species occurs off Papua New Guinea.
