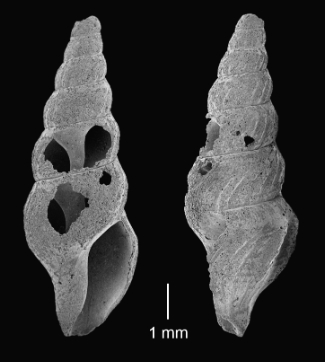
- Shell of Clathurella extenuata (syntype at the Smithsonian Institution)

Scientific classification
- Kingdom: Animalia
- Phylum: Mollusca
- Class: Gastropoda
- Subclass: Caenogastropoda
- Order: Neogastropoda
- Family: Clathurellidae
- Genus: Clathurella
- Species: C. extenuata

Binomial name
- Clathurella extenuata (Dall, 1927)

Synonyms
- Philbertia extenuata Dall, 1927

= Clathurella extenuata =

Species of gastropod

Clathurella extenuata is a species of sea snail, a marine gastropod mollusk in the family Clathurellidae.

== Distribution ==
This species occurs in the Atlantic Ocean along Georgia, USA at a depth of 805 m.
