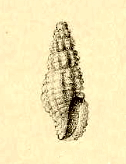
- Original image of a shell of Pseudodaphnella spyridula

Scientific classification
- Kingdom: Animalia
- Phylum: Mollusca
- Class: Gastropoda
- Subclass: Caenogastropoda
- Order: Neogastropoda
- Superfamily: Conoidea
- Family: Raphitomidae
- Genus: Pseudodaphnella
- Species: P. spyridula

Binomial name
- Pseudodaphnella spyridula (Melvill & Standen, 1896)

Synonyms
- Clathurella spyridula Melvill & Standen, 1896 (original combination)

= Pseudodaphnella spyridula =

Species of gastropod

Pseudodaphnella spyridula is a species of sea snail, a marine gastropod mollusk in the family Raphitomidae.

== Description ==
The length of the shell attains 4 mm, its diameter 1 mm.

The very minute shell is narrow, white, latticed, and cancellate, the junctions of these cancellated lirae being gemmuled The shell contains six whorls, two being apical. The aperture is sinuous. The siphonal canal is very short. The outer lip shows eight minute denticules. The sinus is wide and effuse. The columella is straight, and of simple character

== Distribution ==
This marine species occurs off the Loyalty Islands; off Mactan Island, Philippines
