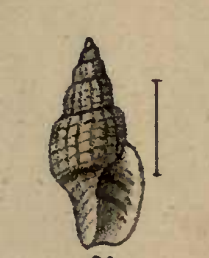
- Drawing of Clathurella canfieldi

Scientific classification
- Kingdom: Animalia
- Phylum: Mollusca
- Class: Gastropoda
- Subclass: Caenogastropoda
- Order: Neogastropoda
- Family: Clathurellidae
- Genus: Clathurella
- Species: C. canfieldi

Binomial name
- Clathurella canfieldi (Dall, 1871)

Synonyms
- Glyphostoma canfieldi (Dall, 1871)

= Clathurella canfieldi =

Species of gastropod

Clathurella canfieldi is a species of sea snail, a marine gastropod mollusc in the family Clathurellidae.

== Description ==
The shell grows to a length of 8 mm. The shell is narrowly shouldered. Numerous indistinct longitudinal plications fade out towards the lower part of the body whorl. There are about sixteen revolving ridges on the body whorl. The anal sinus is deep. The shell is yellowish white, without bands or with from one to three narrow brown bands.

== Distribution ==
This species occurs in the Pacific Ocean along California, USA
