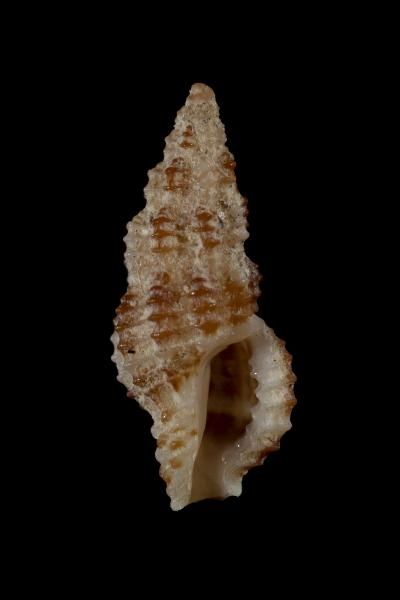
- Shell of Pseudodaphnella pustulata

Scientific classification
- Kingdom: Animalia
- Phylum: Mollusca
- Class: Gastropoda
- Subclass: Caenogastropoda
- Order: Neogastropoda
- Family: Raphitomidae
- Genus: Pseudodaphnella
- Species: P. pustulata

Binomial name
- Pseudodaphnella pustulata (Angas, 1877)

Synonyms
- Clathurella pustulata Angas, 1877

= Pseudodaphnella pustulata =

Species of gastropod

Pseudodaphnella pustulata is a species of sea snail, a marine gastropod mollusk in the family Raphitomidae.

== Description ==
(Original description) The shell is fusiformly turreted and moderately solid. It is white, irregularly longitudinally flamed with brown on the upper whorls, with two broad brown bands on the body whorl. The shell contains six convex whorls, longitudinally costate, with about 10 rounded ribs, encircled by about the same number of narrow prominent ridges that become slightly nodulous at the intersections. The interstices show, under the lens, very faint descending striae. The lower portion of the basal whorl and the columella are strongly granulated. The spire is sharp. The aperture is elongately ovate. The outer lip is thickened and varied behind, dentate within. The columella is nearly straight above, slightly sinuous below. The siphonal canal is short and open. The posterior sinus is broad and shallow.

== Distribution ==
This marine species is endemic to Australia and occurs off New South Wales
