= Clathurella eversoni =

Scientific classification
- Kingdom: Animalia
- Phylum: Mollusca
- Class: Gastropoda
- Subclass: Caenogastropoda
- Order: Neogastropoda
- Family: Clathurellidae
- Genus: Clathurella
- Species: C. eversoni

Binomial name
- Clathurella eversoni Tippett, 1995

Species of gastropod

Clathurella eversoni is a species of sea snail, a marine gastropod mollusk in the family Clathurellidae.

== Distribution ==
This species occurs in the Western Atlantic Ocean and in the Caribbean Sea.
