= Clathurella perdecorata =

Scientific classification
- Kingdom: Animalia
- Phylum: Mollusca
- Class: Gastropoda
- Subclass: Caenogastropoda
- Order: Neogastropoda
- Family: Clathurellidae
- Genus: Clathurella
- Species: C. perdecorata

Binomial name
- Clathurella perdecorata (Dall, 1927)

Synonyms
- Philbertia perdecorata Dall, 1927

Species of gastropod

Clathurella perdecorata is a species of sea snail, a marine gastropod mollusk in the family Clathurellidae.

== Description ==
The shell grows to a length of 11 mm.

== Distribution ==
This species occurs in the Atlantic Ocean along Georgia, USA
