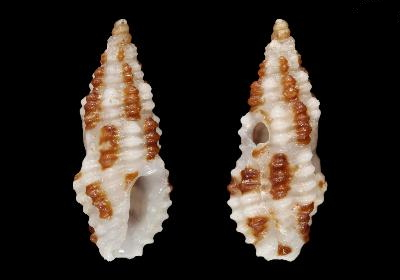
- Original image of a shell of Pseudodaphnella phaeogranulata (holotype at MNHN, Paris)

Scientific classification
- Kingdom: Animalia
- Phylum: Mollusca
- Class: Gastropoda
- Subclass: Caenogastropoda
- Order: Neogastropoda
- Superfamily: Conoidea
- Family: Raphitomidae
- Genus: Pseudodaphnella
- Species: P. phaeogranulata

Binomial name
- Pseudodaphnella phaeogranulata Fedosov & Puillandre, 2012

= Pseudodaphnella phaeogranulata =

Species of gastropod

Pseudodaphnella phaeogranulata is a species of sea snail, a marine gastropod mollusk in the family Raphitomidae.

== Description ==
The length of the shell varies between 4 mm and 6 mm.

== Distribution ==
This marine species occurs off Vanuatu and the Philippines.
