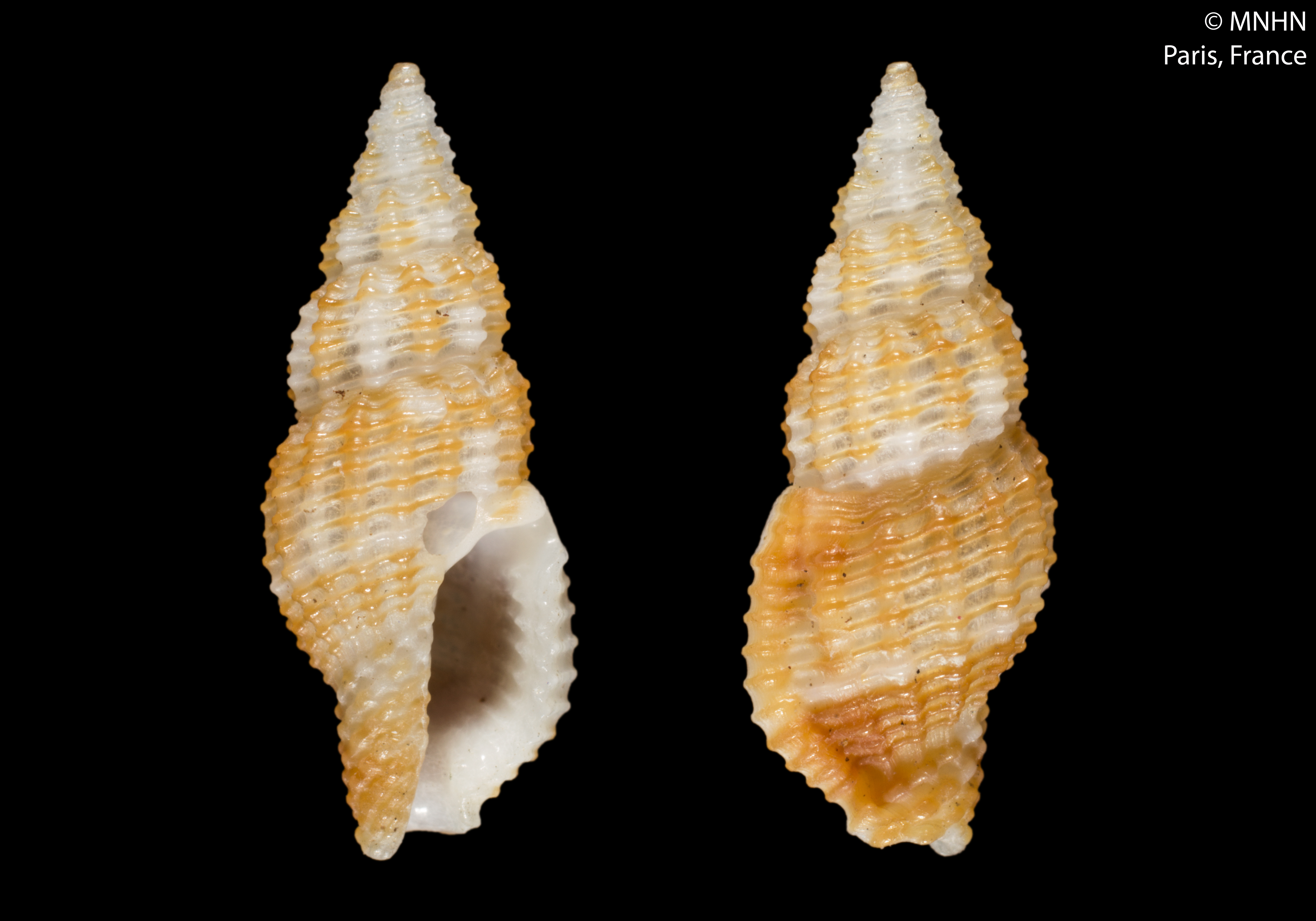
- Shell of Pseudodaphnella rufolirata (syntype at MNHN, Paris)

Scientific classification
- Kingdom: Animalia
- Phylum: Mollusca
- Class: Gastropoda
- Subclass: Caenogastropoda
- Order: Neogastropoda
- Superfamily: Conoidea
- Family: Raphitomidae
- Genus: Pseudodaphnella
- Species: P. rufolirata

Binomial name
- Pseudodaphnella rufolirata (Hervier, 1897)

Synonyms
- Clathurella rufolirata Hervier, 1897 (original combination); Kermia rufolirata (Hervier, 1897); Philbertia rufolirata Hervier, 1897

= Pseudodaphnella rufolirata =

Species of gastropod

Pseudodaphnella rufolirata is a species of sea snail, a marine gastropod mollusk in the family Raphitomidae.

== Description ==
The length of the shell attains 9 mm, its diameter 3.5 mm.

The barely thick shell has an elongate-fusiform shape. It is white with red, fine thread-like lines. The apex is eroded, six whorls remaining. These are somewhat rounded and depressed at the suture. The numerous, slender, wavy, yellowish red longitudinal ribs are crossed in each whorl by 5 to 6 spiral lirae. The body whorl is depressed in the middle and then turning upright. The aperture is wide and oblong and white within. The wide siphonal canal is recurved. The outer lip is denticulate. The columella is upright. The sinus is subsutural, shallow and slightly open between the first and the third lirae.

== Distribution ==
This marine species occurs off the Loyalty Islands; off Mactan Island, Philippines.
