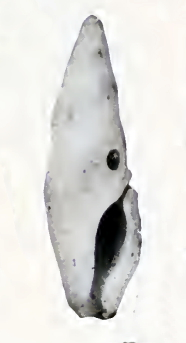
- Original image of a shell of Pseudodaphnella intaminata

Scientific classification
- Kingdom: Animalia
- Phylum: Mollusca
- Class: Gastropoda
- Subclass: Caenogastropoda
- Order: Neogastropoda
- Superfamily: Conoidea
- Family: Raphitomidae
- Genus: Pseudodaphnella
- Species: P. intaminata

Binomial name
- Pseudodaphnella intaminata (Gould, 1860)

Synonyms
- Mangelia intaminata Gould, 1860

= Pseudodaphnella intaminata =

Species of gastropod

Pseudodaphnella intaminata is a species of sea snail, a marine gastropod mollusk in the family Raphitomidae.

== Description ==
The length of the shell attains 7 mm, its diameter 3 mm.

All types were destroyed in the Great Chicago Fire.

== Distribution ==
This species occurs in the China Seas.
