= Pseudodaphnella lucida =

Scientific classification
- Kingdom: Animalia
- Phylum: Mollusca
- Class: Gastropoda
- Subclass: Caenogastropoda
- Order: Neogastropoda
- Superfamily: Conoidea
- Family: Raphitomidae
- Genus: Pseudodaphnella
- Species: P. lucida

Binomial name
- Pseudodaphnella lucida (E. A. Smith, 1884)

Synonyms
- Defrancia lucida (E.A. Smith, 1884); Pleurotoma (Clathurella) lucida E. A. Smith, 1884 (basionym); Pleurotoma lucida E. A. Smith, 1884 (original combination)

Species of gastropod

Pseudodaphnella lucida is a species of sea snail, a marine gastropod mollusk in the family Raphitomidae.

== Description ==
The length of the shell attains 5 mm, its diameter 2 mm.

The oblong shell is slightly turreted, semitranslucent, shining and with a pale horny appearance. The shell contains 7 ? whorls (the apex is broken off). The remaining whorls are rather flat with 8 dense ribs (continuing to the base of the body whorl) and crossed by spiral lirae forming nodules (4 in the penultimate whorl, 10 in the body whorl). The aperture is narrow and measures almost half the length of the shell. The outer lip is very incrassate and slightly sinuate below the suture. The siphonal canal is rather wide and truncate at its base.

The space between the sixth and seventh liration on the body whorl, reckoning from the suture, is rather broader than the other interstices and produces the appearance of a distinct sulcus.

== Distribution ==
This marine species occurs off Western India and Hong Kong.
