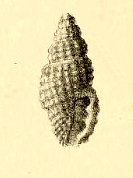
- Original image of a shell of Pseudodaphnella cnephaea

Scientific classification
- Kingdom: Animalia
- Phylum: Mollusca
- Class: Gastropoda
- Subclass: Caenogastropoda
- Order: Neogastropoda
- Superfamily: Conoidea
- Family: Raphitomidae
- Genus: Pseudodaphnella
- Species: P. cnephaea

Binomial name
- Pseudodaphnella cnephaea (Melvill & Standen, 1896)

Synonyms
- Clathurella cnephaea Melvill & Standen, 1896 (original combination)

= Pseudodaphnella cnephaea =

Species of gastropod

Pseudodaphnella cnephaea is a species of sea snail, a marine gastropod mollusk in the family Raphitomidae.

== Description ==
The length of the shell attains 4.75 mm, its diameter 1.5 mm.

The short, solid shell has a fusiform shape. It is corrugate. The shell contains six to seven, slightly ventricose whorls with squarely crossed ribs, both longitudinal and transverse of equal thickness, not many in number, say thirteen on the body whorl, crossed by eleven, of which two spiral lirae below the suture are approximate. The aperture is oblong. The outer lip is denticulate within. The columellar margin stands upright. The sinus does not extend beyond the middle of the outer lip. A completely unicolorous species, being either pale or dark blackish-brown, the latter predominating.

== Distribution ==
This marine species occurs off New Caledonia
