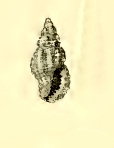
- Original image of a shell of Pseudodaphnella hadfieldi

Scientific classification
- Kingdom: Animalia
- Phylum: Mollusca
- Class: Gastropoda
- Subclass: Caenogastropoda
- Order: Neogastropoda
- Family: Raphitomidae
- Genus: Pseudodaphnella
- Species: P. hadfieldi

Binomial name
- Pseudodaphnella hadfieldi (Melvill & Standen, 1895)

Synonyms
- Clathurella ephela Hervier, 1897; Lienardia hadfieldi (Melvill & Standen, 1895); Pleurotoma (Drillia) hadfieldi Melvill & Standen, 1895 (original combination); Pseudodaphnella ephela Hervier, R.P.J., 1897

= Pseudodaphnella hadfieldi =

Species of gastropod

Pseudodaphnella hadfieldi is a species of sea snail, a marine gastropod mollusk in the family Raphitomidae.

== Description ==
The length of the shell attains 6 mm, its diameter 3 mm.

The white fusiform shell is wrinkled. It contains seven whorls with a few longitudinal ribs. These ribs are pronounced and ventricose. They are alternately squarrosely ochre-colored. The aperture is subrotund. The outer lip is incrassate and denticulate within. The columella is simple and slightly blistered on the outside.

== Distribution ==
This marine species occurs off the Loyalty Islands, Indonesia, New Caledonia, Palau
