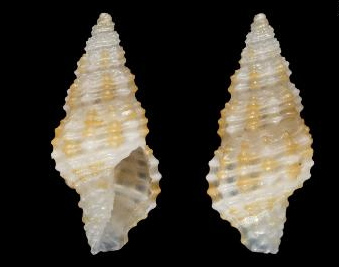
- Original image of a shell of Pseudodaphnella boholensis (holotype at MNHN, Paris)

Scientific classification
- Kingdom: Animalia
- Phylum: Mollusca
- Class: Gastropoda
- Subclass: Caenogastropoda
- Order: Neogastropoda
- Superfamily: Conoidea
- Family: Raphitomidae
- Genus: Pseudodaphnella
- Species: P. boholensis

Binomial name
- Pseudodaphnella boholensis Fedosov & Puillandre, 2012

= Pseudodaphnella boholensis =

Species of gastropod

Pseudodaphnella boholensis is a species of sea snail, a marine gastropod mollusk in the family Raphitomidae.

== Description ==
The length of the shell varies between 4 mm and 6.5 mm.

== Distribution ==
This marine species occurs off Panglao Island, South Bohol, Philippines
