= Clathurella pertabulata =

Scientific classification
- Kingdom: Animalia
- Phylum: Mollusca
- Class: Gastropoda
- Subclass: Caenogastropoda
- Order: Neogastropoda
- Superfamily: Conoidea
- Family: Clathurellidae
- Genus: Clathurella
- Species: C. pertabulata

Binomial name
- Clathurella pertabulata R. Sturany, 1903

Synonyms
- Mangilia pertabulata R. Sturany, 1903

Species of gastropod

Clathurella pertabulata is a species of sea snail, a marine gastropod mollusk in the family Clathurellidae.

== Distribution ==
This marine species occurs in the Red Sea.
