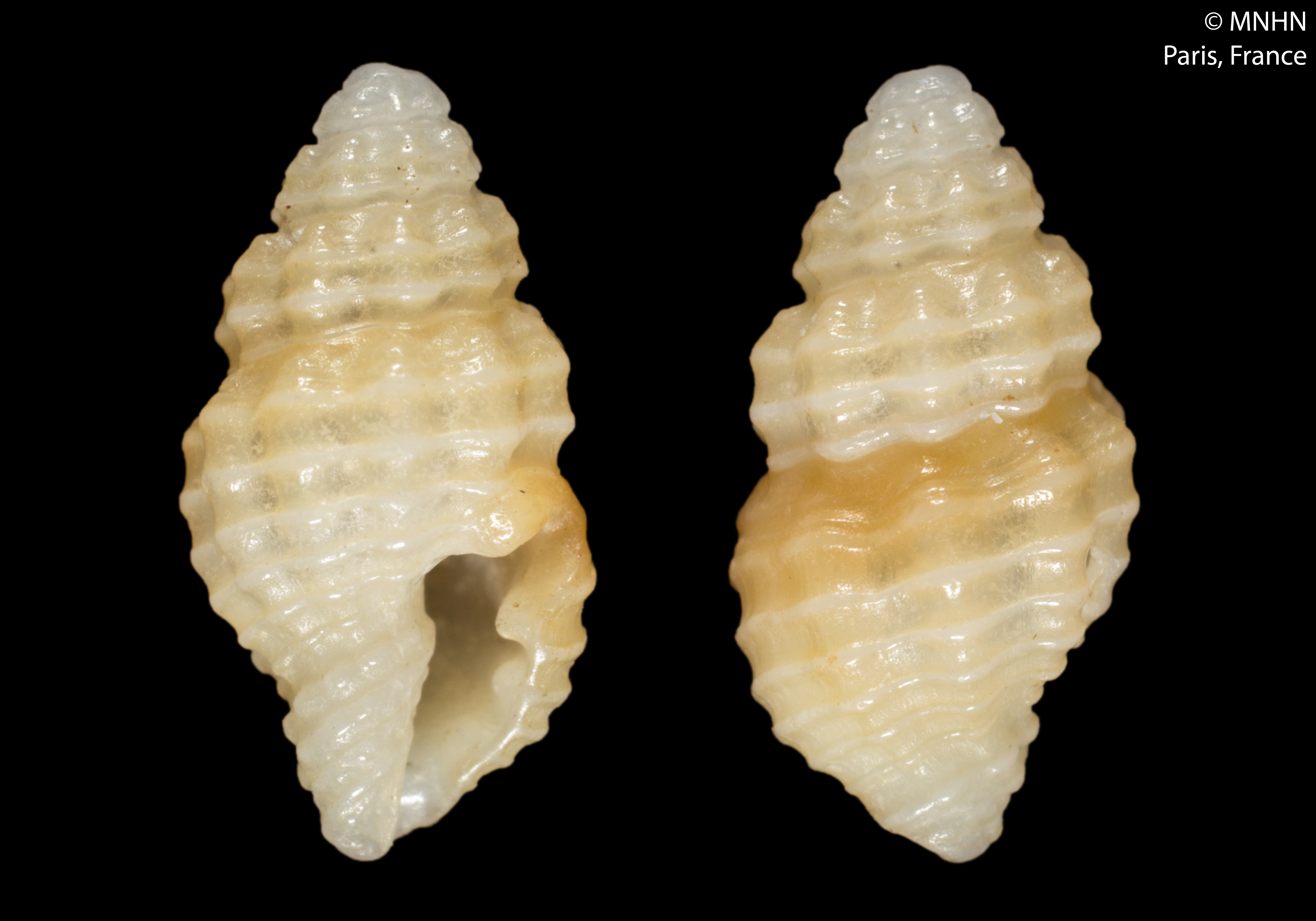
- Shell of Thetidos globulosa (syntype at MNHN, Paris)

Scientific classification
- Kingdom: Animalia
- Phylum: Mollusca
- Class: Gastropoda
- Subclass: Caenogastropoda
- Order: Neogastropoda
- Family: Raphitomidae
- Genus: Thetidos; Hedley, 1899

Type species
- Thetidos morsura Hedley, 1899

= Thetidos =

Genus of gastropods

Thetidos is a genus of sea snails, marine gastropod mollusks in the family Raphitomidae.

== Species ==
- † Thetidos fossilis Lozouet, 2017
- Thetidos globulosa (Hervier, 1896)
- Thetidos madecassina Bozzetti, 2020
- Thetidos minutissima Fedosov & Stahlschmidt, 2014
- Thetidos morsura Hedley, 1899
- Thetidos pallida Fedosov & Stahlschmidt, 2014
- Thetidos puillandrei Fedosov & Stahlschmidt, 2014
- Thetidos tridentata Fedosov & Puillandre, 2012
