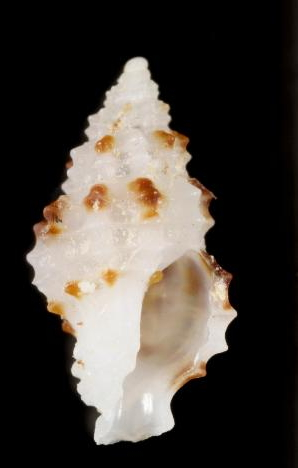

Scientific classification
- Kingdom: Animalia
- Phylum: Mollusca
- Class: Gastropoda
- Subclass: Caenogastropoda
- Order: Neogastropoda
- Superfamily: Conoidea
- Family: Raphitomidae
- Genus: Pseudodaphnella
- Species: P. rubroguttata

Binomial name
- Pseudodaphnella rubroguttata (H. Adams, 1872)

Synonyms
- Clathurella rubroguttata H. Adams, 1872 (original combination); Philbertia rubroguttata (H. Adams, 1872)

= Pseudodaphnella rubroguttata =

Species of gastropod

Pseudodaphnella rubroguttata is a species of sea snail, a marine gastropod mollusk in the family Raphitomidae.

== Distribution ==
This marine species occurs off New Hebrides and Papua New Guinea.
