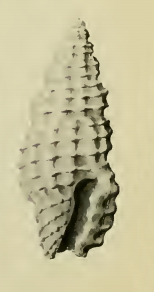
- Original image of a shell of Paramontana punicea

Scientific classification
- Kingdom: Animalia
- Phylum: Mollusca
- Class: Gastropoda
- Subclass: Caenogastropoda
- Order: Neogastropoda
- Superfamily: Conoidea
- Family: Raphitomidae
- Genus: Paramontana
- Species: P. punicea

Binomial name
- Paramontana punicea (Hedley, 1922)

Synonyms
- Pseudodaphnella punicea Hedley, 1922 (original combination)

= Paramontana punicea =

Species of gastropod

Paramontana punicea is a species of sea snail, a marine gastropod mollusk in the family Raphitomidae.

This species has also been considered a synonym of Pseudodaphnella pullula Hervier, R.P.J., 1897

== Description ==
The length of the shell attains 5.5 mm, its diameter 2.5 mm.

(Original description) The small, solid shell is ovate-lanceolate and acuminate. The shell contains 7 whorls, including a two-whorled protoconch. Its colour is uniform lilac.

Sculpture: Stout perpendicular ribs extending from the shoulder to the base are set at thirteen to a whorl, about their own breadth apart. The spirals number three or four on the upper whorls, and nine on the body whorl. A bead occurs where a spiral intersects a rib, and on the snout, where the radials do not otherwise appear, the small close spirals are still beaded. The aperture is wide. The varix is massive There are four denticules within the outer lip.

== Distribution ==
This marine species occurs off New Caledonia and Australia (Queensland).
