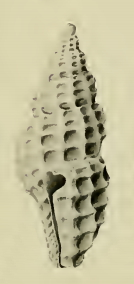
- Image of a shell of Paramontana modesta

Scientific classification
- Kingdom: Animalia
- Phylum: Mollusca
- Class: Gastropoda
- Subclass: Caenogastropoda
- Order: Neogastropoda
- Superfamily: Conoidea
- Family: Raphitomidae
- Genus: Paramontana
- Species: P. modesta

Binomial name
- Paramontana modesta (Angas, 1877)

Synonyms
- Clathurella modesta Angas, 1877 (original combination); Defrancia modesta (Angas, 1877); Pseudodaphnella modesta (Angas, 1877)

= Paramontana modesta =

Species of gastropod

Paramontana modesta is a species of sea snail, a marine gastropod mollusk in the family Raphitomidae.

This species has also been considered a synonym of Pseudodaphnella pullula Hervier, R.P.J., 1897

== Description ==
The original description written by George French Angas is as follows: "The fusiformly turreted, shell is solid and fulvous brown. The 5½ whorls are convex, stoutly and distantly longitudinally ribbed, and crossed with prominent erect ridges becoming sharply nodulous at the intersection. The spire is sharp. The aperture is narrowly ovate. The outer lip is somewhat flattened and thickened, strongly dentate within. The columella is a little sinuous, with a few small granulations at the base of the whorl. The posterior sinus is rather broad."

As is frequently the case in this genus, this species has a light and a dark colour dimorphism. A brown specimen in the British Museum presented by Angas is marked there as the type.

== Distribution ==
This marine species is endemic to Australia and occurs off New South Wales, South Australia and Victoria.
