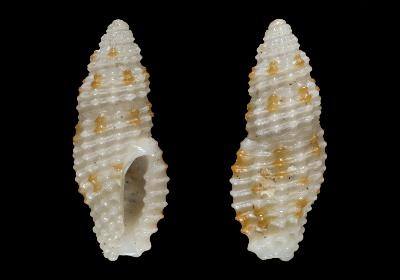
- Shell of Pseudodaphnella crasselirata (syntype at MNHN, Paris)

Scientific classification
- Kingdom: Animalia
- Phylum: Mollusca
- Class: Gastropoda
- Subclass: Caenogastropoda
- Order: Neogastropoda
- Superfamily: Conoidea
- Family: Raphitomidae
- Genus: Pseudodaphnella
- Species: P. crasselirata

Binomial name
- Pseudodaphnella crasselirata (Hervier, 1897)

Synonyms
- Clathurella crasselirata Hervier, 1897 (original combination); Clathurella albofuniculata var. crasselirata (Reeve, 1846) (basionym); Clathurella tincta crasselirata Bouge, L.J. & Dautzenberg, P.L. 1914

= Pseudodaphnella crasselirata =

Species of gastropod

Pseudodaphnella crasselirata is a species of sea snail, a marine gastropod mollusk in the family Raphitomidae.

== Description ==
The elongate-fusiform shell shows somewhat rotund whorls. The ribs are packed together and intersected by thick lirae. The white shell is shiny and is dotted with scattered yellowish-brown dots.

== Distribution ==
This marine species occurs off the Gulf of Carpentaria to Queensland, Australia; it also occurs off New Caledonia.
