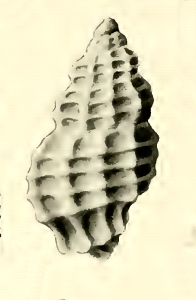
- Original image of a shell of Pseudodaphnella stipata

Scientific classification
- Kingdom: Animalia
- Phylum: Mollusca
- Class: Gastropoda
- Subclass: Caenogastropoda
- Order: Neogastropoda
- Superfamily: Conoidea
- Family: Raphitomidae
- Genus: Pseudodaphnella
- Species: P. stipata

Binomial name
- Pseudodaphnella stipata Hedley, 1922

= Pseudodaphnella stipata =

Species of gastropod

Pseudodaphnella stipata is a species of sea snail, a marine gastropod mollusk in the family Raphitomidae.

== Description ==
The length of the shell attains 4 mm, its diameter 2 mm.

(Original description) The small shell is solid and broad in proportion to length. The adult shell contains about 4 whorls.

Sculpture:—The radials are prominently spaced ribs, set about ten to a whorl. The spirals are strong cords, two on the antepenultimate whorl, three on the penultimate whorl, and seven on the body whorl. On the latter the third spiral from the suture runs into the top of the varix, between the fourth and the fifth is a wide gap, and the last three are tubercular and traverse the snout. The aperture shows a very thick and prominent varix. The sinus is small and shallow.

== Distribution ==
This marine species is endemic to Australia and occurs off Queensland
