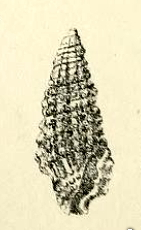
- Original image of a shell of Paramontana blanfordi

Scientific classification
- Kingdom: Animalia
- Phylum: Mollusca
- Class: Gastropoda
- Subclass: Caenogastropoda
- Order: Neogastropoda
- Superfamily: Conoidea
- Family: Raphitomidae
- Genus: Paramontana
- Species: P. blanfordi

Binomial name
- Paramontana blanfordi (G. Nevill & H. Nevill, 1875)

Synonyms
- Clathurella blanfordi G. Nevill & H. Nevill, 1875 (original combination)

= Paramontana blanfordi =

Species of gastropod

Paramontana blanfordi is a species of sea snail, a marine gastropod mollusk in the family Raphitomidae.

== Description ==
The length of the shell attains 5.5 mm, its diameter 2.5 mm.

(Original description) The cylindrically ovate shell is elongate. The sutures are rather indistinct. The apex is sharp and pointed, a beautiful deep mauve colour throughout. The shell contains 7 to 8 whorls, longitudinally and transversely ribbed. The ribs are ery prominent, of equal thickness, forming granules at the points of intersection. Towards the base of the body whorl an excavated furrow appears. The columella is short and twisted. The aperture is moderately wide, contorted, with a rather large sinus. The outer lip is thickened with two or three granules just within the aperture.

== Distribution ==
This marine species occurs in the Indian Ocean off Eritrea.
