= Philbertia alba =

Scientific classification
- Kingdom: Animalia
- Phylum: Mollusca
- Class: Gastropoda
- Subclass: Caenogastropoda
- Order: Neogastropoda
- Superfamily: Conoidea
- Family: Raphitomidae
- Genus: Philbertia
- Species: P. alba

Binomial name
- Philbertia alba (Deshayes, 1863)

Synonyms
- Pleurotoma alba Deshayes, 1863

Species of gastropod

Philbertia alba is a species of sea snail, a marine gastropod mollusk in the family Raphitomidae.

This is a taxon inquirendum.

== Distribution ==
This marine species occurs off Réunion.
