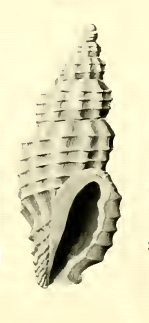
- Original image of a shell of Pseudodaphnella oligoina

Scientific classification
- Kingdom: Animalia
- Phylum: Mollusca
- Class: Gastropoda
- Subclass: Caenogastropoda
- Order: Neogastropoda
- Superfamily: Conoidea
- Family: Raphitomidae
- Genus: Pseudodaphnella
- Species: P. oligoina

Binomial name
- Pseudodaphnella oligoina Hedley, 1922

Synonyms
- Kermia oligoina Hedley, 1922; Paramontana oligoina (Hedley, 1922)

= Pseudodaphnella oligoina =

Species of gastropod

Pseudodaphnella oligoina is a species of sea snail, a marine gastropod mollusk in the family Raphitomidae.

== Description ==
The length of the shell attains 7 mm, its diameter 3 mm.

(Original description) The shell is of medium size, rather thin, lanceolate, turreted, with a sloping shoulder, perpendicular periphery, and an excavate base. Its colour is uniform pale buff. The shell contains 7 whorls, including a two-whorled protoconch.

Sculpture: The radials are discontinuous from whorl to whorl, feeble and oblique on the shoulder, prominent and perpendicular on the peripheral area, and traversing the basal excavation, widely spaced. There are on the body whorl ten spirals slighter than the radials. On the fasciole area of the body whorl are three faint and narrow threads. From the shoulder to the basal angle are five cords, which override the ribs and thus enclose a series of oblong and nearly uniform meshes. On the snout are six crowded and progressively diminishing beaded spirals. The upper whorls carry four spirals. Within the meshes are fine radial striae. The basal furrow is spaced as if a spiral of regular sequence to the rest were omitted. The aperture is unusually wide. The varix is prominent, more massive than the ribs. The sinus is shallow. The siphonal canal is bent, short, and open.

This species has a general resemblance to Kermia spelaeodea Hervier, 1897 (synonym of Pseudodaphnella infrasulcata (Garrett, 1873)) from New Caledonia, but is smaller, thinner, less cylindrical, and with fewer radials and spirals, resulting in larger meshes in the sculpture.

== Distribution ==
This marine species is endemic to Australia and occurs off Queensland. It has also been found off Cebu, the Philippines.
