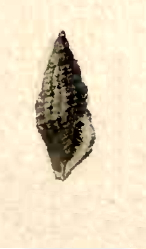
- Drawing of a shell of Pseudodaphnella leuckarti

Scientific classification
- Kingdom: Animalia
- Phylum: Mollusca
- Class: Gastropoda
- Subclass: Caenogastropoda
- Order: Neogastropoda
- Superfamily: Conoidea
- Family: Raphitomidae
- Genus: Pseudodaphnella
- Species: P. leuckarti

Binomial name
- Pseudodaphnella leuckarti (Dunker, 1860)

Synonyms
- Clathurella leuckarti (Dunker, 1860); Daphnella (Mangilia) leuckarti (Dunker, 1860); Mangilia leuckarti Dunker, 1860

= Pseudodaphnella leuckarti =

Species of gastropod

Pseudodaphnella leuckarti is a species of sea snail, a marine gastropod mollusk in the family Raphitomidae.

== Description ==
The length of the shell attains 7 mm, its diameter 2.5 mm.

The shell has an ovately acute shape with 6-7 slightly convex whorls. The surface of this small monochrome brown snail is characterized by fairly dense, rounded longitudinal ribs, covered by regular raised striae, forming a coarse grid. The aperture is narrow and somewhat shorter than half the length of the shell. The siphonal canal is straight and short, in which the longitudinal ribs are still visible.

== Distribution ==
This marine species occurs off Japan, Korea and the Philippines.
