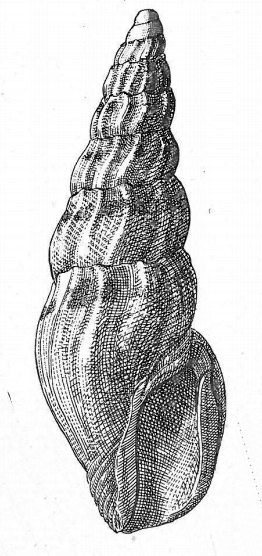
- Original image of a shell of Mangelia decaryi

Scientific classification
- Kingdom: Animalia
- Phylum: Mollusca
- Class: Gastropoda
- Subclass: Caenogastropoda
- Order: Neogastropoda
- Superfamily: Conoidea
- Family: Mangeliidae
- Genus: Mangelia
- Species: M. decaryi

Binomial name
- Mangelia decaryi Dautzenberg, 1932

Synonyms
- Mangilia decaryi P. Dautzenberg, 1932; Pseudodaphnella decaryi (Dautzenberg 1932)

= Mangelia decaryi =

Species of gastropod

Mangelia decaryi is a species of sea snail, a marine gastropod mollusk in the family Mangeliidae.

== Description ==
The length of the shell attains 13 mm, its diameter 4 mm.

This rather solid shell had a high spire with 8 convex whorls, separated by a distinct suture. The whorls in the protoconch are smooth. The others show axial plicae that are a little arcuate and become sigmoid on the body whorl. The aperture is rather wide and lacks a siphonal canal at its base. The columella shows a callosity that becomes rather thick at the top. The outer lip is incrassate, bends off inwards and ends at the top into a large and deep sinus. The color of the shell is white, banded in the upper whorls by a series of brown spots between the axial plicae.

== Distribution ==
This marine species occurs off Madagascar
