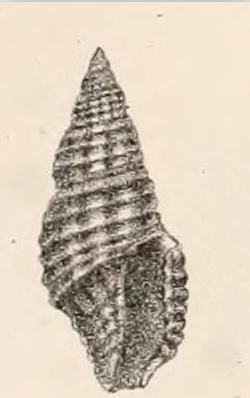
- Shell of Pseudodaphnella infrasulcata

Scientific classification
- Kingdom: Animalia
- Phylum: Mollusca
- Class: Gastropoda
- Subclass: Caenogastropoda
- Order: Neogastropoda
- Superfamily: Conoidea
- Family: Raphitomidae
- Genus: Pseudodaphnella
- Species: P. infrasulcata

Binomial name
- Pseudodaphnella infrasulcata (Garrett, 1873)

Synonyms
- Clathurella infrasulcata Garrett, 1873 (original combination); Clathurella spelaeodea Hervier, 1897 (original combination); Kermia spelaeodea (Hervier, 1897)

= Pseudodaphnella infrasulcata =

Species of gastropod

Pseudodaphnella infrasulcata is a species of sea snail, a marine gastropod mollusk in the family Raphitomidae.

== Description ==
The length of the shell varies between 6 mm and 10 mm.

The shell is slightly angulated above, longitudinally distantly ribbed, latticed with narrow raised revolving ridges and cavernously grooved near the base. The color of the shell is chestnut, lighter on the ridges.

== Distribution ==
This marine species occurs off the Fiji Islands.
