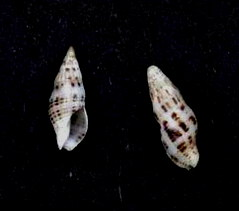
- Maculotriton serriale (Deshayes, 1834); family Muricidae

Scientific classification
- Kingdom: Animalia
- Phylum: Mollusca
- Class: Gastropoda
- Subclass: Caenogastropoda
- Order: Neogastropoda
- Family: Muricidae
- Genus: Maculotriton; Dall, 1904
- Species: M. serriale

Binomial name
- Maculotriton serriale (Deshayes, 1833)

= Maculotriton =

Genus of gastropods

Maculotriton is a monotypic genus of sea snails, marine gastropod mollusks in the family Muricidae, the murex snails or rock snails. Its sole accepted species is Maculotriton serriale.

== Synonyms ==
The following species have been synonymized with Maculotriton serriale:

- Buccinum pulicaris Lesson, 1842
- Buccinum serriale Deshayes in Laborde & Linant, 1834
- Charonia digitalis (Reeve, 1844)
- Clathurella epidelia (Duclos in Chenu, 1848)
- Clathurella pulicaris (Lesson, 1842)
- Clathurella waterhouseae Brazier, 1896
- Colubraria bracteata (Hinds, 1844)
- Colubraria digitalis (Reeve, 1844)
- Columbella epidelia Duclos in Chenu, 1848
- Columbella pulicaris Lesson, 1842
- Epidromus bracteatus (Hinds, 1844)
- Eutriton digitalis (Reeve, 1844)
- Eutriton digitalis var. seurati Couturier, 1907
- Eutritonium digitale (Reeve, 1844)
- Maculotriton bracteatus (Hinds, 1844)
- Maculotriton bracteatus longus Pilsbry & Vanatta, 1904
- Maculotriton digitale (Reeve, 1844)
- Triton angulatus Reeve, 1844
- Triton bacillum Reeve, 1844
- Triton bracteatus Hinds, 1844
- Triton bracteatus longus Pilsbry & Vanatta, 1904
- Triton digitale Reeve, 1844
- Triton lativaricosus Reeve, 1844
- Tritonidea petterdi Brazier, 1872
