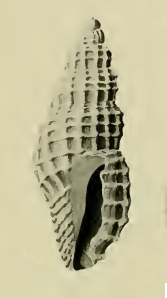
- Original image of a shell of Paramontana mayana

Scientific classification
- Kingdom: Animalia
- Phylum: Mollusca
- Class: Gastropoda
- Subclass: Caenogastropoda
- Order: Neogastropoda
- Superfamily: Conoidea
- Family: Raphitomidae
- Genus: Paramontana
- Species: P. mayana

Binomial name
- Paramontana mayana Hedley, 1922

Synonyms
- Pseudodaphnella mayana Hedley, 1922 (original combination)

= Paramontana mayana =

Species of gastropod

Paramontana mayana, common name May's turrid, is a species of sea snail, a marine gastropod mollusk in the family Raphitomidae.

== Description ==
The length of the shell attains 6 mm, its diameter 2 mm.

(Original description) The small, lanceolate, subturretedshell is rather thin. Its colour is uniform white or uniform cinnamon, or white spotted with cinnamon. The shell contains 6 whorls, including a two-whorled protoconch.

The sculpture is variable, according as extra threads are or are not intercalated. The radials extend from suture to base and traverse the basal furrow, narrow, discontinuous from whorl to whorl, perpendicular, twelve to fourteen to a whorl. The spirals number from eleven to fifteen, according to presence or absence of intercalated threads. On the snout six or seven close and knotted threads, then a wide basal furrow followed by from five to eight fine threads which by intersection with the radials on the peripheral area enclose large meshes. On the upper whorls are from two to four spirals. The aperture is open and toothless. The varix is much thicker than the ribs. The sinus is very small. The siphonal canal is short and open.

== Distribution ==
This marine species is endemic to Australia and occurs off Tasmania.
