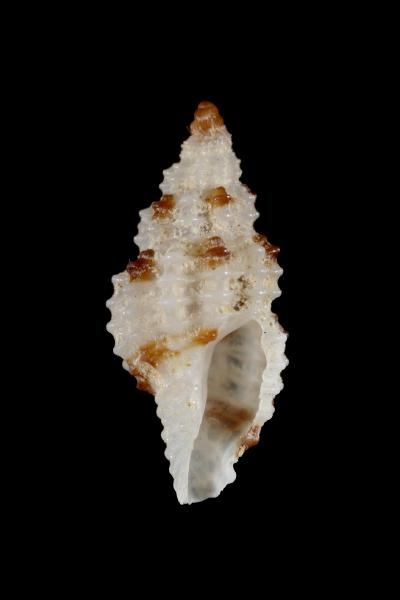
- Shell of Pseudodaphnella tincta (specimen at MNHN, Paris)

Scientific classification
- Kingdom: Animalia
- Phylum: Mollusca
- Class: Gastropoda
- Subclass: Caenogastropoda
- Order: Neogastropoda
- Superfamily: Conoidea
- Family: Raphitomidae
- Genus: Pseudodaphnella
- Species: P. tincta

Binomial name
- Pseudodaphnella tincta (Reeve, 1846)

Synonyms
- Clathurella centrosa Pilsbry, 1904; Clathurella corrugata Dunker, R.W., 1871; Clathurella rubroguttata Adams, H. 1872; Clathurella tincta (Reeve, 1846); Defrancia corrugata (Dunker, 1871); Philbertia centrosa (Pilsbry, 1904); Philbertia tincta (Reeve, 1846); Philbertia (Pseudodaphnella) tincta (Reeve, 1846); Pleurotoma tincta Reeve, 1846 (original combination)

= Pseudodaphnella tincta =

Species of gastropod

Pseudodaphnella tincta is a species of sea snail, a marine gastropod mollusk in the family Raphitomidae.

== Description ==
The length of the shell varies between 4 mm and 12 mm.

The longitudinal ribs of the white shell are strong, with revolving riblets reticulating them and with deep interstices. The sinus is broad.

The small, solid shell has a fusiform shape. It is white with a series of brown spots below the suture on alternate ribs, and a brown band on the base. The sculpture consists of numerous longitudinal ribs slightly narrower than their intervals, and about 13 in number on the body whorl. These are crossed by spiral cords, narrower than their intervals, of which there are 6 on the body whorl, followed by a costate space, as though a cord had been omitted, and then 4 more beaded, oblique cords on the narrow, lower part of the whorl. The apex is broken off with 4½ whorls remainingt The body whorl shows a thick varix behind the outer lip. The aperture is narrow with two low teeth within the outer lip. The anal sinus is deep and rounded. (described as Clathurella centrosa)

== Distribution ==
This marine species occurs in the Southwest Pacific and off Japan, the Philippines and Queensland, Australia.
