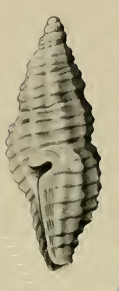
- Image of a shell of Paramontana rufozonata

Scientific classification
- Kingdom: Animalia
- Phylum: Mollusca
- Class: Gastropoda
- Subclass: Caenogastropoda
- Order: Neogastropoda
- Superfamily: Conoidea
- Family: Raphitomidae
- Genus: Paramontana
- Species: P. rufozonata

Binomial name
- Paramontana rufozonata (Angas, 1877)

Synonyms
- Clathurella rufozonata Angas, 1877 (original combination); Defrancia rufozonata (Angas, 1877); Pseudodaphnella rufozonata (Angas, 1877)

= Paramontana rufozonata =

Species of gastropod

Paramontana rufozonata, common name red-zoned turrid, is a species of sea snail, a marine gastropod mollusk in the family Raphitomidae.

== Description ==
The length of the shell attains 5 mm.

(Original description) The fusiformly turreted, solid shell is white, sometimes with a zone of double interrupted chestnut lines near the base of the body whorl, similar chestnut markings being occasionally apparent here and there near the upper portion of the whorls. The shell contains 6 whorls, convex, longitudinally ribbed and crossed with transverse ridges that become sharply and prominently nodulous upon the ribs. The spire is sharp with a light brown apex. The aperture is narrowly quadrate. The outer lip is varicose and denticulated. The posterior sinus is moderate.

(Discussion as Pseudodaphnella rufozonata by Charles Hedley) By G. B. Sowerby this species was united to P. tincta Reeve, and to P. albifuniculata Reeve, an arrangement copied by Pritchard and Gatliff. But P. rufozonata is only two-thirds the height of P. tincta, is of a more slender build, and lacks the peculiar excavate base of that tropical species. The latter feature is shown in Reeve's figure, and is mentioned by Hervier as the " depression circulaire autour de son canal basal." The records by Melvill and Standen and by Bouge and Dautzenberg of P. rufozonata, from the Loyalty Islands, are doubtless due to the confusion between this and P. tincta. P. rufozonata is indeed more nearly related to P. albifuniculata Reeve, but is smaller, more fusiform, and has the radials more prominent owing to the spirals being slighter. A more distant relation is P. barnardi, easily separable by the heavier sculpture and striking colour pattern.

== Distribution ==
This marine species is endemic to Australia and occurs off New South Wales, South Australia, Tasmania and Victoria.
