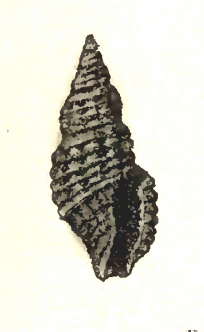
- Shell of Kermia cavernosa

Scientific classification
- Kingdom: Animalia
- Phylum: Mollusca
- Class: Gastropoda
- Subclass: Caenogastropoda
- Order: Neogastropoda
- Superfamily: Conoidea
- Family: Raphitomidae
- Genus: Kermia
- Species: K. cavernosa

Binomial name
- Kermia cavernosa (Reeve, 1845)

Synonyms
- Daphnella (Mangilia cavernosa (Reeve, 1845); Clathurina cavernosa (Reeve, 1845); Pleurotoma cavernosa Reeve, 1845 (original combination); Pseudodaphnella cavernosa (Reeve, 1845)

= Kermia cavernosa =

Species of gastropod

Kermia cavernosa is a species of sea snail, a marine gastropod mollusk in the family Raphitomidae.

== Description ==
The length of the shell attains 9 – 10 mm.

The shell is narrowly shouldered. The ribs are oblique, rather narrow. The shell is white, the shoulder light chestnut, with sometimes a few chestnut spots on the body whorl.

== Distribution ==
This marine species occurs off the Philippines, Indonesia and in the Persian Gulf and Fiji Islands
