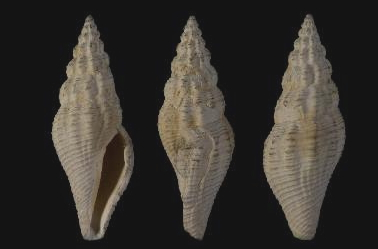
- Shell of † Raphitoma gougeroti (specimen at MNHN, Paris)
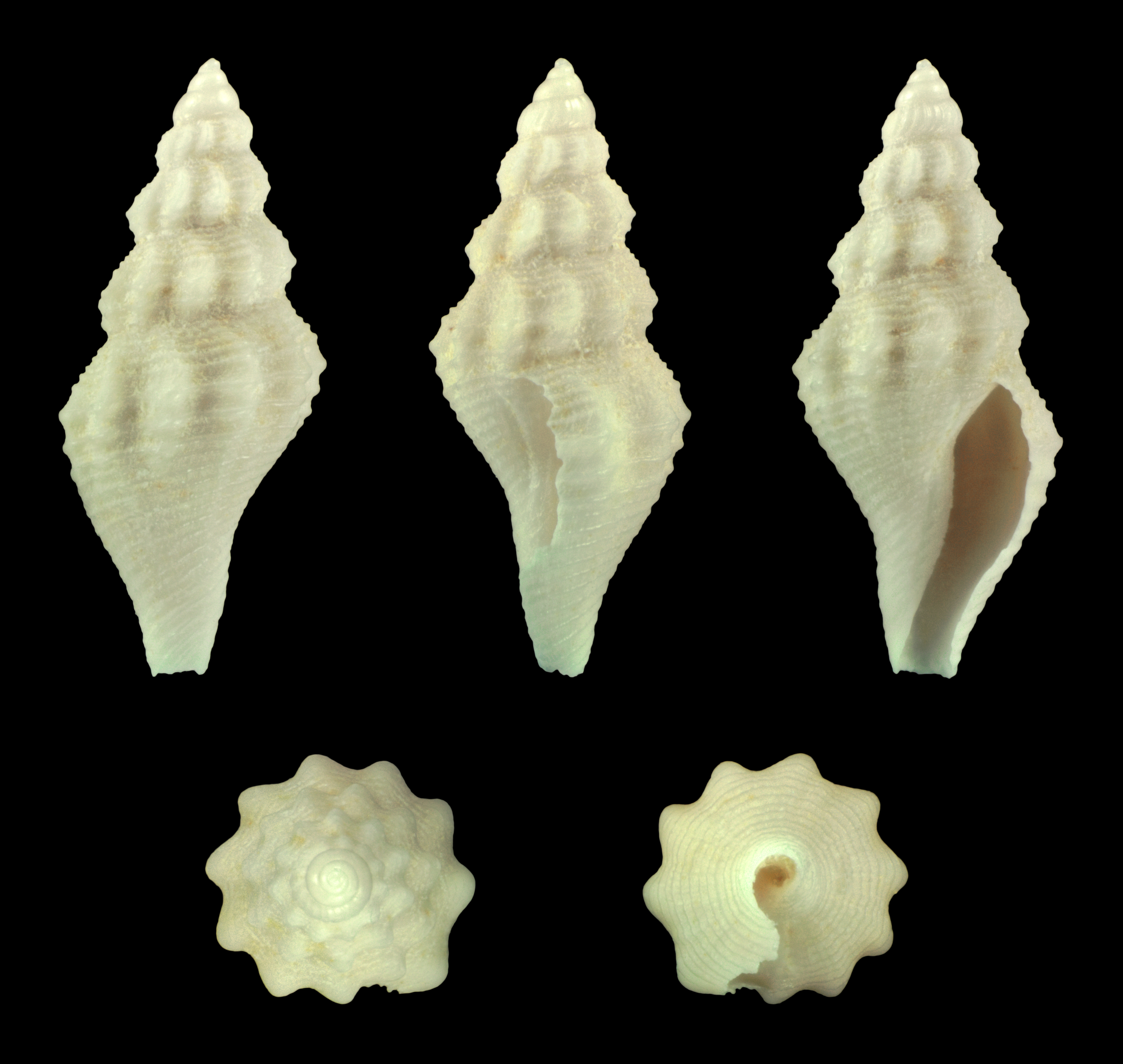
- Juvenile

Scientific classification
- Kingdom: Animalia
- Phylum: Mollusca
- Class: Gastropoda
- Subclass: Caenogastropoda
- Order: Neogastropoda
- Superfamily: Conoidea
- Family: Raphitomidae
- Genus: Raphitoma
- Species: R. gougeroti

Binomial name
- Raphitoma gougeroti Tucker & Le Renard, 1993

Synonyms
- † Amblyacrum rugosum (Deshayes, 1834); † Peratotoma (Amblyacrum) rugosa (Deshayes, 1834); † Raphitoma rugosa (Deshayes, 1834); † Raphitoma (Amblyacrum) rugosa (Deshayes, 1834); † Raphitoma (Amblyacrum) gougeroti Tucker & Le Renard, 1993

= Raphitoma gougeroti =

Extinct species of gastropod

Raphitoma gougeroti is an extinct species of sea snail, a marine gastropod mollusc in the family Raphitomidae.

It was renamed as Raphitoma gougeroti by J. Tucker & Le Renard in 1993

== Distribution ==
Fossils of this extinct marine species were found in Eocene strata in the Paris Basin, France.
