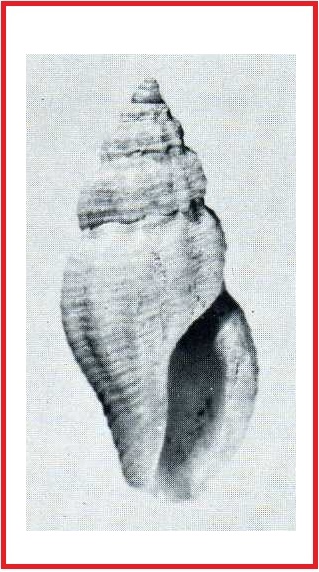

Scientific classification
- Kingdom: Animalia
- Phylum: Mollusca
- Class: Gastropoda
- Subclass: Caenogastropoda
- Order: Neogastropoda
- Superfamily: Conoidea
- Family: Raphitomidae
- Genus: Philbertia
- Species: P. shaskyi

Binomial name
- Philbertia shaskyi McLean & Poorman, 1971

= Philbertia shaskyi =

Species of gastropod

Philbertia shaskyi is a species of sea snail, a marine gastropod mollusk in the family Raphitomidae.

== Distribution ==
This marine species occurs off Baja California, Mexico
