= Philbertia doris =

Scientific classification
- Kingdom: Animalia
- Phylum: Mollusca
- Class: Gastropoda
- Subclass: Caenogastropoda
- Order: Neogastropoda
- Superfamily: Conoidea
- Family: Raphitomidae
- Genus: Philbertia
- Species: P. doris

Binomial name
- Philbertia doris Dall, 1919

Synonyms
- Defrancia alternans Paetel, 1888; Philbertia alternans Monterosato, 1884 (original combination); Raphitoma (Raphitoma) bucquoyi Locard, E.A.A., 1886; Raphitoma (Raphitoma) bucquoyi sfaxiana Nordsieck, F., 1977

Species of gastropod

Philbertia doris is a species of sea snail, a marine gastropod mollusk in the family Raphitomidae.
