= Raphitoma densa =

Scientific classification
- Kingdom: Animalia
- Phylum: Mollusca
- Class: Gastropoda
- Subclass: Caenogastropoda
- Order: Neogastropoda
- Superfamily: Conoidea
- Family: Raphitomidae
- Genus: Raphitoma
- Species: R. densa

Binomial name
- Raphitoma densa (Monterosato, 1884)

Synonyms
- Clathurella decorata Locard, 1891; Philbertia densa Monterosato, 1884; Philbertia densa fusca (var.) Locard, E.A.A. & E. Caziot, 1900; Philbertia densa minor (var.) Locard, E.A.A. & E. Caziot, 1900; Philbertia densa rufa (var.) Locard, E.A.A. & E. Caziot, 1900; Raphitoma (Philbertia) bourguignati tarentina F. Nordsieck, 1977; Raphitoma (Philbertia) flavida F. Nordsieck, 1977; Raphitoma flavida F. Nordsieck, 1977

Species of gastropod

Raphitoma densa is a species of sea snail, a marine gastropod mollusk in the family Raphitomidae.

== Description ==
The length of the shell varies between 9 mm and 12 mm.

== Distribution ==
This species occurs in the Western and Central Mediterranean Sea.
