= Raphitoma histrix =

Scientific classification
- Kingdom: Animalia
- Phylum: Mollusca
- Class: Gastropoda
- Subclass: Caenogastropoda
- Order: Neogastropoda
- Superfamily: Conoidea
- Family: Raphitomidae
- Genus: Raphitoma
- Species: R. histrix

Binomial name
- Raphitoma histrix Bellardi, 1847

Synonyms
- † Defrancia histrix Jeffreys, 1856; † Echion histrix Monter., 1872; † Mangelia histrix Forest., 1868; †Pleurotoma hystrix de Cristofori & Jan, 1832 (nomen nudum); † Pleurotoma spinulosa Cont., 1864

Extinct species of gastropod

Raphitoma histrix is an extinct species of sea snail, a marine gastropod mollusk in the family Raphitomidae.

Raphitoma histrix was first described as a fossil from the Pliocene of north-western Italy, though the name had also been used for shells from both the Mediterranean and western Africa.

== Distribution ==
Fossils of this marine species were found in Pliocene strata in Italy.
