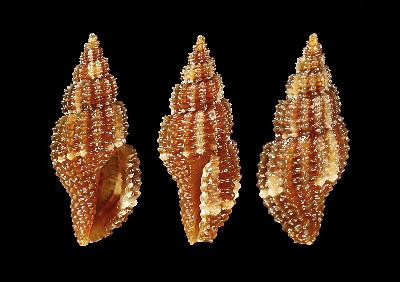
- Shell of Raphitoma kharybdis (holotype in MNHN, Paris)

Scientific classification
- Kingdom: Animalia
- Phylum: Mollusca
- Class: Gastropoda
- Subclass: Caenogastropoda
- Order: Neogastropoda
- Superfamily: Conoidea
- Family: Raphitomidae
- Genus: Raphitoma
- Species: R. kharybdis

Binomial name
- Raphitoma kharybdis Pusateri & Giannuzzi-Savelli, 2018

= Raphitoma kharybdis =

Species of mollusc

Raphitoma kharybdis is a species of sea snail, a marine gastropod mollusk in the family Raphitomidae.

== Description ==
The length of the shell attains 8.4 mm. The protoconch is paucispiral.

== Distribution ==
This marine species occurs in the Mediterranean Sea off Sicily, Italy.
