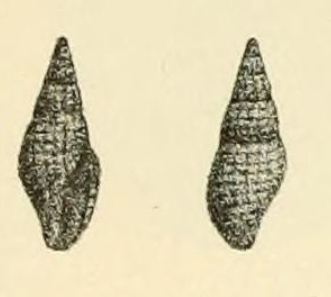
- Original image of a shell of Raphitoma corbis

Scientific classification
- Kingdom: Animalia
- Phylum: Mollusca
- Class: Gastropoda
- Subclass: Caenogastropoda
- Order: Neogastropoda
- Superfamily: Conoidea
- Family: Raphitomidae
- Genus: Raphitoma
- Species: R. corbis

Binomial name
- Raphitoma corbis (Potiez & Michaud, 1838)

Synonyms
- Clathurella corbiformis Locard, 1886 (unjustified emendation); Clathurella corbis Locard, 1886; Defrancia corbis Paetel, 1888; Philbertia corbiformis Nordsieck, 1968; Philbertia corbis Sabelli et al., 1990; Pleurotoma corbis Potiez, 1838; Raphitoma corbiformis Locard & Caziot, 1900; Raphitoma (Philbertia) corbis Nordsieck, 1977

= Raphitoma corbis =

Species of gastropod

Raphitoma corbis is a species of sea snail, a marine gastropod mollusk in the family Raphitomidae.

== Description ==
The length of the shell varies between 8 mm and 12 mm, its diameter between 3.4 mm and 4.5 mm.

== Distribution ==
This marine species occurs in the Mediterranean Sea.
