= Raphitoma brunneofasciata =

Scientific classification
- Kingdom: Animalia
- Phylum: Mollusca
- Class: Gastropoda
- Subclass: Caenogastropoda
- Order: Neogastropoda
- Superfamily: Conoidea
- Family: Raphitomidae
- Genus: Raphitoma
- Species: R. brunneofasciata

Binomial name
- Raphitoma brunneofasciata Pusateri, Giannuzzi-Savelli & Oliverio, 2013

Synonyms
- Raphitoma brevis F. Nordsieck, 1977 (preoccupied name)

Species of gastropod

Raphitoma brunneofasciata is a species of sea snail, a marine gastropod mollusk in the family Raphitomidae.
