= Raphitoma ferroviae =

Scientific classification
- Kingdom: Animalia
- Phylum: Mollusca
- Class: Gastropoda
- Subclass: Caenogastropoda
- Order: Neogastropoda
- Superfamily: Conoidea
- Family: Raphitomidae
- Genus: Raphitoma
- Species: †R. ferroviae

Binomial name
- †Raphitoma ferroviae (Cossmann, 1923)

Synonyms
- Turricula (Crenaturricula) dentata ferroviae (Cossmann, 1923)

Extinct species of gastropod

Raphitoma ferroviae is an extinct species of sea snail, a marine gastropod mollusc in the family Raphitomidae.

== Description ==
The length of the shell reaches 13 mm (0.51 in).

== Distribution ==
Fossils of this extinct marine species were found in Eocene strata in Aquitaine, France
