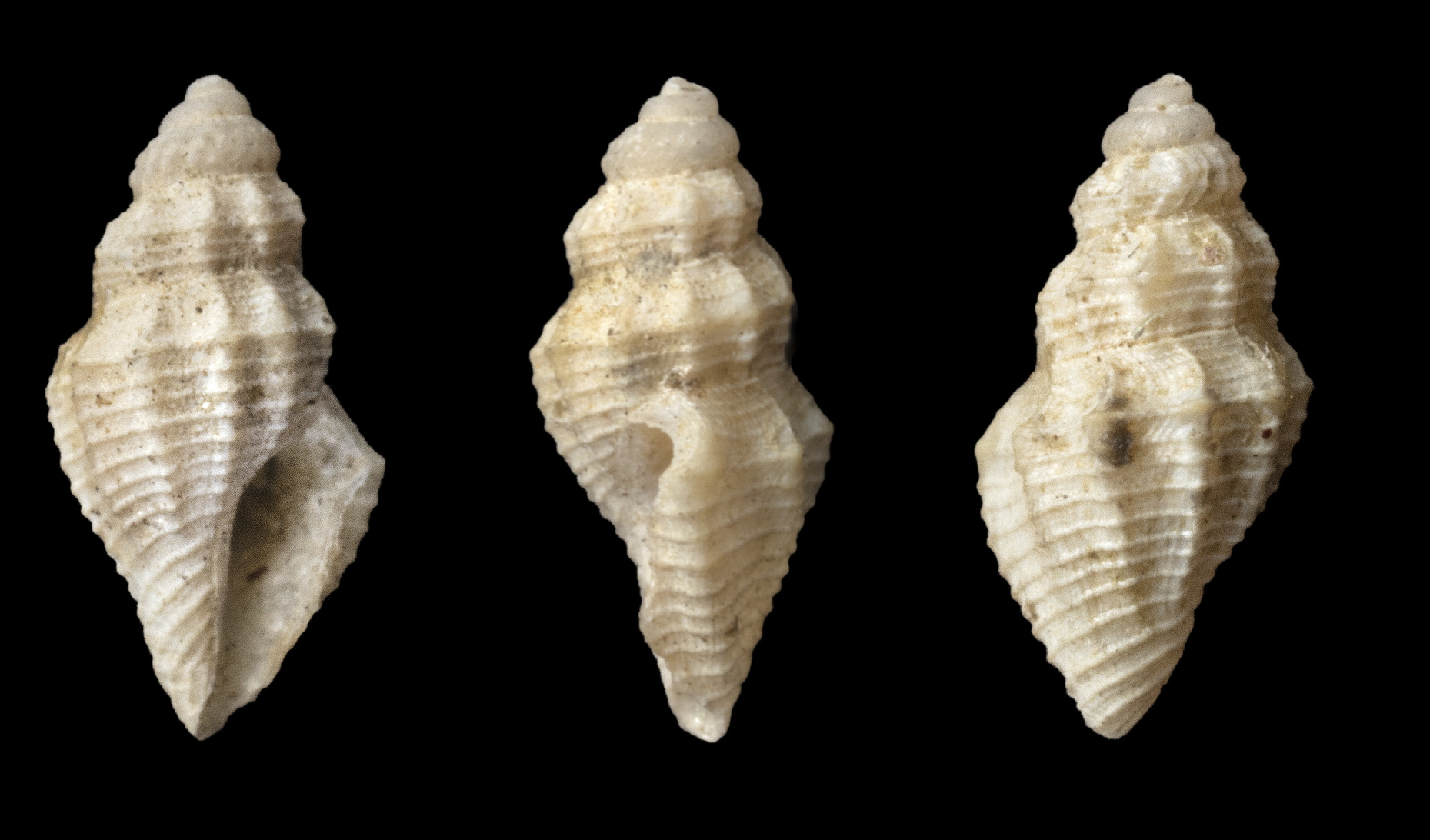
- Shell of Raphitoma perinsignis (specimen at Natural History Museum, London)

Scientific classification
- Kingdom: Animalia
- Phylum: Mollusca
- Class: Gastropoda
- Subclass: Caenogastropoda
- Order: Neogastropoda
- Superfamily: Conoidea
- Family: Raphitomidae
- Genus: Raphitoma
- Species: R. perinsignis

Binomial name
- Raphitoma perinsignis (E.A. Smith, 1884)

Synonyms
- Philbertia perinsignis (E. A. Smith, 1884); Pleurotoma (Clathurella) perinsignis E. A. Smith, 1884 (basionym); Pleurotoma perinsignis E.A. Smith, 1884

= Raphitoma perinsignis =

Species of gastropod

Raphitoma perinsignis is a species of sea snail, a marine gastropod mollusk in the family Raphitomidae.

== Description ==
The shell reaches a length of 7.7 mm and a diameter of 3 mm.

The ovate-fusiform shell is slightly pink with a reddish line around the body whorl. The shell contains eight whorls, including three smooth, convex whorls in the protoconch. The subsequent whorls are convex and somewhat shouldered above the middle. They are covered with 10-12 narrow ribs. Towards the outer lip the ribs gradually become more remote from each other. The raised lines of growth are conspicuous and cross the five spiral lirations (16–20 on the body whorl), which are thus made minutely subgranulous. The aperture measures about half the length of the shell. The outer lip is incrassate and slightly sinuate above. The short siphonal canal is narrow.

== Distribution ==
This marine species occurs off Japan.
