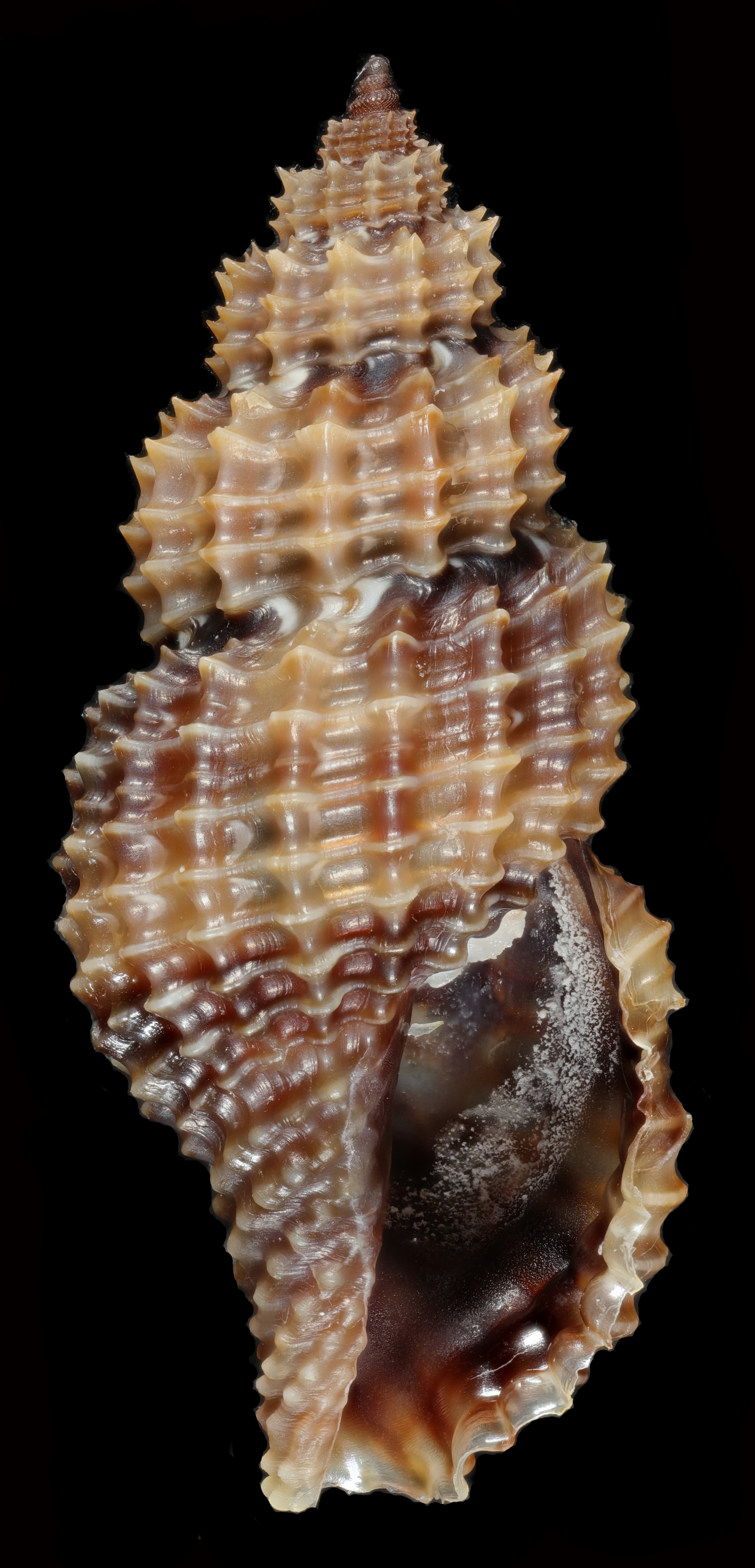
- Shell of Raphitoma antipolitana (holotype at MNHN, Paris)

Scientific classification
- Kingdom: Animalia
- Phylum: Mollusca
- Class: Gastropoda
- Subclass: Caenogastropoda
- Order: Neogastropoda
- Superfamily: Conoidea
- Family: Raphitomidae
- Genus: Raphitoma
- Species: R. antipolitana

Binomial name
- Raphitoma antipolitana Pelorce & Horst, 2020

= Raphitoma antipolitana =

Species of gastropod

Raphitoma antipolitana is a species of sea snail, a marine gastropod mollusc in the family Raphitomidae.

== Description ==
The length of the shell attains 12.6 mm.

== Distribution ==
This marine species was found off France in the Mediterranean Sea.
