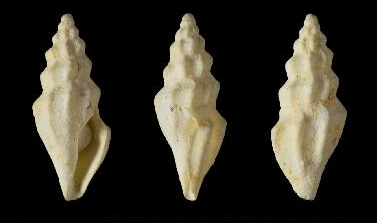
- Shell of Raphitoma baudoni (holotype at MNHN, Paris)

Scientific classification
- Kingdom: Animalia
- Phylum: Mollusca
- Class: Gastropoda
- Subclass: Caenogastropoda
- Order: Neogastropoda
- Superfamily: Conoidea
- Family: Raphitomidae
- Genus: Raphitoma
- Species: †R. baudoni

Binomial name
- †Raphitoma baudoni (Deshayes, 1865)

Synonyms
- Amblyacrum baudoni Glibert, 1960; Daphnella (Raphitoma) baudoni Cossmann, 1896; Pleurotoma baudoni Deshayes, 1865 (original combination); Raphitoma costellata baudoni Gougerot & Le Renard, 1981

= Raphitoma baudoni =

Extinct species of gastropod

Raphitoma baudoni is an extinct species of sea snail, a marine gastropod mollusc in the family Raphitomidae.

== Distribution ==
Fossils of this extinct marine species were found in Eocene strata in France.
