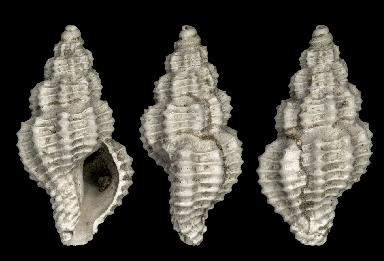
- Shell of † Raphitoma raynevali (specimen at MNHN, Paris)

Scientific classification
- Kingdom: Animalia
- Phylum: Mollusca
- Class: Gastropoda
- Subclass: Caenogastropoda
- Order: Neogastropoda
- Superfamily: Conoidea
- Family: Raphitomidae
- Genus: Raphitoma
- Species: R. raynevali

Binomial name
- Raphitoma raynevali (Bellardi, 1877)

= Raphitoma raynevali =

Extinct species of gastropod

Raphitoma raynevali is an extinct species of sea snail, a marine gastropod mollusc in the family Raphitomidae.

== Description ==
The length of the shell reaches 7 mm, its diameter is 3 mm.

== Distribution ==
Fossils of this extinct marine species were found in Pliocene strata in Languedoc, France.
