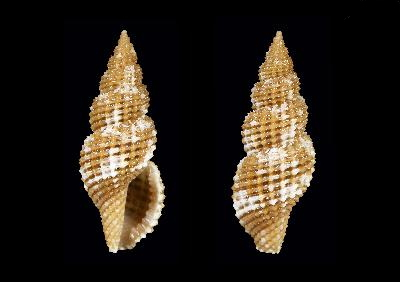
- Shell of Raphitoma griseomaculata (holotype in MNHN, Paris)

Scientific classification
- Kingdom: Animalia
- Phylum: Mollusca
- Class: Gastropoda
- Subclass: Caenogastropoda
- Order: Neogastropoda
- Superfamily: Conoidea
- Family: Raphitomidae
- Genus: Raphitoma
- Species: R. griseomaculata

Binomial name
- Raphitoma griseomaculata Pusateri & Giannuzzi-Savelli, 2018

= Raphitoma griseomaculata =

Species of mollusc

Raphitoma griseomaculata is a species of sea snail, a marine gastropod mollusk in the family Raphitomidae.

== Description ==
The length of the holotype reaches 13.9 mm. Its diameter is 5.5 mm.

== Distribution ==
This marine species occurs in the Mediterranean Sea off Lecce, Italy
