= Raphitoma bernardoi =

Scientific classification
- Kingdom: Animalia
- Phylum: Mollusca
- Class: Gastropoda
- Subclass: Caenogastropoda
- Order: Neogastropoda
- Superfamily: Conoidea
- Family: Raphitomidae
- Genus: Raphitoma
- Species: R. bernardoi

Binomial name
- Raphitoma bernardoi Rolán, Otero-Schmitt & Fernandes, 1998

Species of mollusc

Raphitoma bernardoi is a species of sea snail, a marine gastropod mollusk in the family Raphitomidae.

== Description ==
The shell attains a length of 11 mm.

== Distribution ==
This species occurs in the Atlantic Ocean off Ghana to Angola; off the Cape Verdes.
