= Raphitoma locardi =

Scientific classification
- Kingdom: Animalia
- Phylum: Mollusca
- Class: Gastropoda
- Subclass: Caenogastropoda
- Order: Neogastropoda
- Superfamily: Conoidea
- Family: Raphitomidae
- Genus: Raphitoma
- Species: R. locardi

Binomial name
- Raphitoma locardi Pusateri, Giannuzzi-Savelli & Oliverio, 2013

Synonyms
- Clathurella cylindrica Locard & Caziot, 1900 (preoccupied by Clathurella cylindrica Pease, 1860; Raphitoma locardi is a replacement name); Raphitoma cylindracea [sic] (misspelling of Clathurella cylindrica Locard & Caziot, 1900)

Species of gastropod

Raphitoma locardi is a species of sea snail, a marine gastropod mollusk in the family Raphitomidae.
