= Raphitoma syrtensis =

Scientific classification
- Kingdom: Animalia
- Phylum: Mollusca
- Class: Gastropoda
- Subclass: Caenogastropoda
- Order: Neogastropoda
- Superfamily: Conoidea
- Family: Raphitomidae
- Genus: Raphitoma
- Species: R. syrtensis

Binomial name
- Raphitoma syrtensis F. Nordsieck, 1977

Synonyms
- Raphitoma linearis syrtensae (F. Nordsieck, 1977)

Species of gastropod

Raphitoma syrtensis is a species of sea snail, a marine gastropod mollusk in the family Raphitomidae.

== Distribution ==
This species occurs in the Mediterranean Sea off Tunisia
