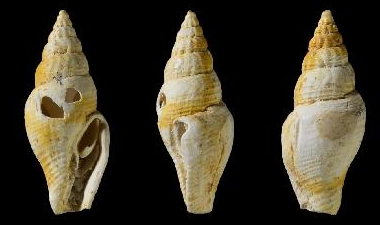
- Shell of Raphitoma boutillieri (holotype at MNHN, Paris)

Scientific classification
- Kingdom: Animalia
- Phylum: Mollusca
- Class: Gastropoda
- Subclass: Caenogastropoda
- Order: Neogastropoda
- Superfamily: Conoidea
- Family: Raphitomidae
- Genus: Raphitoma
- Species: †R. boutillieri

Binomial name
- †Raphitoma boutillieri Cossmann, 1889

Synonyms
- Amblyacrum boutillieri Glibert, 1960; Daphnella (Raphitoma) boutillieri Cossmann, 1896

= Raphitoma boutillieri =

Extinct species of gastropod

Raphitoma boutillieri is an extinct species of sea snail, a marine gastropod mollusc in the family Raphitomidae.

== Distribution ==
Fossils of this extinct marine species were found in Eocene strata in France.
