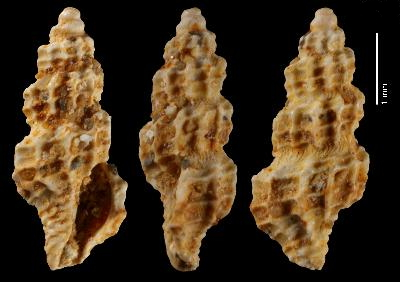
- Shell of † Raphitoma merignacensis (specimen at MNHN, Parsi)

Scientific classification
- Kingdom: Animalia
- Phylum: Mollusca
- Class: Gastropoda
- Subclass: Caenogastropoda
- Order: Neogastropoda
- Superfamily: Conoidea
- Family: Raphitomidae
- Genus: Raphitoma
- Species: †R. merignacensis

Binomial name
- †Raphitoma merignacensis (Peyrot, 1931)

= Raphitoma merignacensis =

Extinct species of gastropod

Raphitoma merignacensis is an extinct species of sea snail, a marine gastropod mollusc in the family Raphitomidae.

== Distribution ==
Fossils of this extinct marine species were found in Oligocene strata in France.
