= Raphitoma farolita =

Scientific classification
- Kingdom: Animalia
- Phylum: Mollusca
- Class: Gastropoda
- Subclass: Caenogastropoda
- Order: Neogastropoda
- Superfamily: Conoidea
- Family: Raphitomidae
- Genus: Raphitoma
- Species: R. farolita

Binomial name
- Raphitoma farolita F. Nordsieck, 1977

Synonyms
- Raphitoma (Raphitoma) servaini farolita F. Nordsieck, 1977 (original combination)

Species of gastropod

Raphitoma farolita is a species of sea snail, a marine gastropod mollusk in the family Raphitomidae.

== Distribution ==
This marine species occurs in the Mediterranean Sea off the Baleares.
