= Raphitoma natalensis =

Scientific classification
- Kingdom: Animalia
- Phylum: Mollusca
- Class: Gastropoda
- Subclass: Caenogastropoda
- Order: Neogastropoda
- Superfamily: Conoidea
- Family: Raphitomidae
- Genus: Raphitoma
- Species: R. natalensis

Binomial name
- Raphitoma natalensis (Barnard, 1958)

Synonyms
- Philbertia natalensis Barnard, 1958

Species of marine gastropod mollusc

Raphitoma natalensis is a species of sea snail, a marine gastropod mollusk in the family Raphitomidae.

== Description ==
The shell reaches a length of 5 mm and a diameter of 2.3 mm.

== Distribution ==
This marine species occurs off South Africa.
