= Raphitoma perpulchra =

Scientific classification
- Kingdom: Animalia
- Phylum: Mollusca
- Class: Gastropoda
- Subclass: Caenogastropoda
- Order: Neogastropoda
- Superfamily: Conoidea
- Family: Raphitomidae
- Genus: Raphitoma
- Species: R. perpulchra

Binomial name
- Raphitoma perpulchra (S.V. Wood, 1848 )

Synonyms
- Clavatula perpulchra S.V. Wood, 1848

Extinct species of gastropod

Raphitoma perpulchra is an extinct species of sea snail, a marine gastropod mollusc, in the family Raphitomidae.

== Description ==
The length of the shell reaches 10 mm.

(Original description) "The small shell is turriculate and fusiform. It has an elevated spire and convex whorls. The whorls are longitudinally costated with 11 - 12 ribs on the body whorl. It is transversely striated with sharp and elevated striae. The outer lip is curved and thickened on the outside. It has a large and deep sinus at the suture. The siphonal canal is short and very open."

== Distribution ==
Fossils of this extinct marine species were found in Pliocene strata in Belgium and the Crag Formation, Sutton, England.
