= Raphitoma formosa =

Scientific classification
- Kingdom: Animalia
- Phylum: Mollusca
- Class: Gastropoda
- Subclass: Caenogastropoda
- Order: Neogastropoda
- Superfamily: Conoidea
- Family: Raphitomidae
- Genus: Raphitoma
- Species: R. formosa

Binomial name
- Raphitoma formosa (Jeffreys, 1867)

Synonyms
- Defrancia reticulata var. formosa Jeffreys, 1867 (basionym)

Species of gastropod

Raphitoma formosa is a species of sea snail, a marine gastropod mollusk in the family Raphitomidae.

== Distribution ==
This species occurs in the English Channel and off Norway.
