= Raphitoma erinaceus =

Scientific classification
- Kingdom: Animalia
- Phylum: Mollusca
- Class: Gastropoda
- Subclass: Caenogastropoda
- Order: Neogastropoda
- Superfamily: Conoidea
- Family: Raphitomidae
- Genus: Raphitoma
- Species: †R. erinaceus

Binomial name
- †Raphitoma erinaceus (Bellardi, 1877)

Synonyms
- Homotoma erinaceus Bellardi, 1877

Extinct species of gastropod

Raphitoma raynevali is an extinct species of sea snail, a marine gastropod mollusc in the family Raphitomidae.

== Description ==
The shell reached a maximum length 9.5 mm, its diameter is 5.5 mm.

== Distribution ==
Fossils of this extinct marine species were found in Pliocene strata in Italy.
