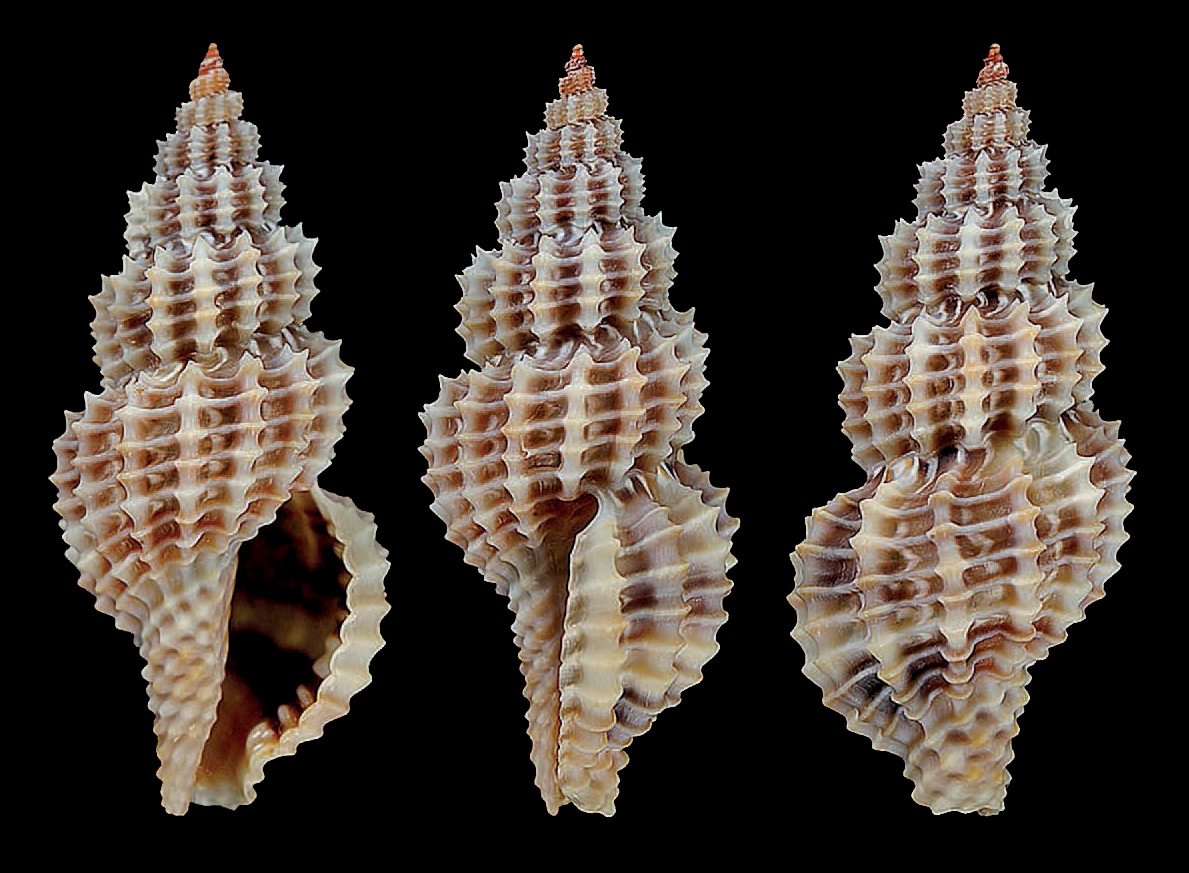
- Shell of Raphitoma stanici (holotype at MNHN, Paris)

Scientific classification
- Kingdom: Animalia
- Phylum: Mollusca
- Class: Gastropoda
- Subclass: Caenogastropoda
- Order: Neogastropoda
- Superfamily: Conoidea
- Family: Raphitomidae
- Genus: Raphitoma
- Species: R. stanici

Binomial name
- Raphitoma stanici Prkić, Giannuzzi-Savelli & Pusateri, 2020

= Raphitoma stanici =

Species of gastropod

Raphitoma stanici is a species of sea snail, a marine gastropod mollusk in the family Raphitomidae.

== Description ==
The Raphitoma Stanici have a length of the shell that attains 14.3 mm.

In many parts European waters, this genus can occurly be seen in the northern part of the Mediterranean Sea, and in the Atlantic Ocean of Cape Verde, West Africa and Angola.

== Distribution ==
This marine species occurs in the Croatian part of the Adriatic Sea.
