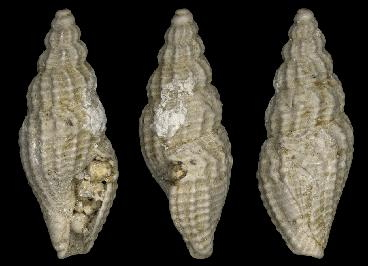
- Shell of † Raphitoma perplexa (specimen at MNHN, Paris)

Scientific classification
- Kingdom: Animalia
- Phylum: Mollusca
- Class: Gastropoda
- Subclass: Caenogastropoda
- Order: Neogastropoda
- Superfamily: Conoidea
- Family: Raphitomidae
- Genus: Raphitoma
- Species: †R. perplexa

Binomial name
- †Raphitoma perplexa (Deshayes, 1865)

Synonyms
- Pleurotoma perplexa Deshayes, 1865

= Raphitoma perplexa =

Extinct species of gastropod

Raphitoma perplexa is an extinct species of sea snail, a marine gastropod mollusc in the family Raphitomidae.

== Distribution ==
Fossils of this extinct marine species were found in Eocene strata in France.
