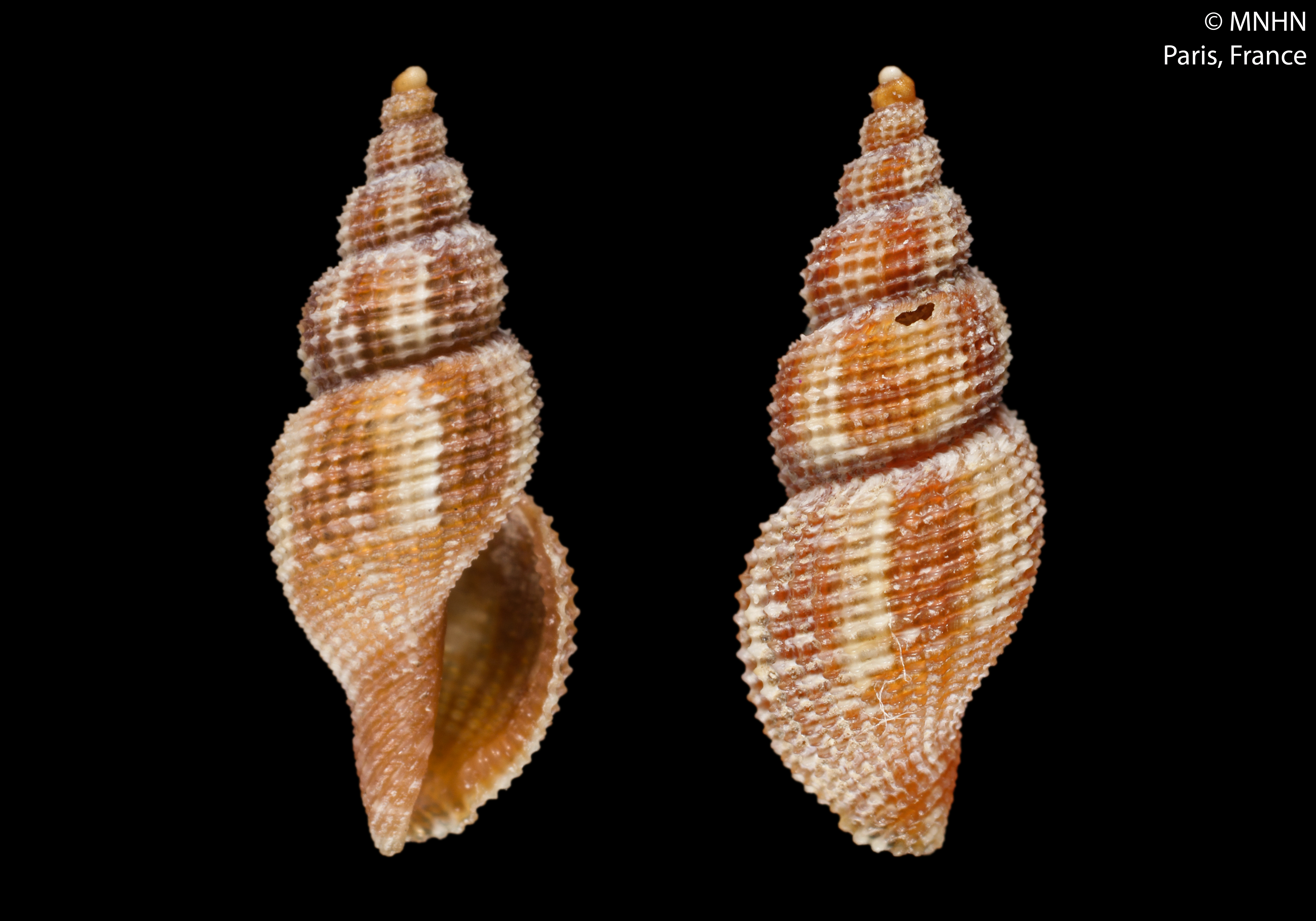
- Shell of Raphitoma pruinosa (syntype at MNHN, Paris)

Scientific classification
- Kingdom: Animalia
- Phylum: Mollusca
- Class: Gastropoda
- Subclass: Caenogastropoda
- Order: Neogastropoda
- Superfamily: Conoidea
- Family: Raphitomidae
- Genus: Raphitoma
- Species: R. pruinosa

Binomial name
- Raphitoma pruinosa (Pallary, 1906)

Synonyms
- Philbertia pruinosa Pallary, 1906

= Raphitoma pruinosa =

Species of gastropod

Raphitoma pruinosa is a species of sea snail, a marine gastropod mollusk in the family Raphitomidae.

== Description ==
The length of the shell attains 13 mm, its diameter 5½ mm.

The fusiform shell is elongated with impressed sutures. The high, pointed spire contains 7 whorls, of which two smooth whorls in the protoconch. The subsequent five whorls are convex, cancelled by numerous axial ribs and lamellar decurrent threads. The body whorl measures more than half the length of the shell. The aperture is suboval. The columella is straight. The open siphonal canal is rather long. The rounded outer lip is thickened and denticled inside. The sutural sinus is narrow and conspicuous. The ground color of the shell is a bright pale yellow with whitish spots.

== Distribution ==
This marine species occurs in the Mediterranean Sea off Tunisia.
