= Raphitoma gabusogana =

Scientific classification
- Kingdom: Animalia
- Phylum: Mollusca
- Class: Gastropoda
- Subclass: Caenogastropoda
- Order: Neogastropoda
- Superfamily: Conoidea
- Family: Raphitomidae
- Genus: Raphitoma
- Species: †R. gabusogana

Binomial name
- †Raphitoma gabusogana S. Nomura & N. Zinbo, 1936

Extinct species of gastropod

Raphitoma gabusogana is an extinct species of sea snail, a marine gastropod mollusc in the family Raphitomidae.

== Description ==
The length of the shell reaches 9 mm, its diameter 3.5 mm.

== Distribution ==
Fossils of this extinct marine species were found in Miocene strata on Okinawa.
