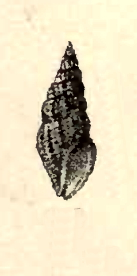
- Shell of Raphitoma strucki

Scientific classification
- Kingdom: Animalia
- Phylum: Mollusca
- Class: Gastropoda
- Subclass: Caenogastropoda
- Order: Neogastropoda
- Superfamily: Conoidea
- Family: Raphitomidae
- Genus: Raphitoma
- Species: R. strucki

Binomial name
- Raphitoma strucki (Maltzan, 1883)

Synonyms
- Mangilia (Raphitoma) strucki Maltzan, 1883 (basionym); Mangilia strucki Maltzan, 1883 (original combination)

= Raphitoma strucki =

Species of mollusc

Raphitoma strucki is a species of sea snail, a marine gastropod mollusk in the family Raphitomidae.

== Description ==
The length of the shell reaches 5.5 mm.

The shell has a turreted fusiform shape, with a produced spire and deep sutures. The color of the shell is reddish brown. It contains nine, straight ribs, decussated and rendered nodulous by spiral riblets. The sinus is nearly obsolete. The outer lip is thickened and dentate.

== Distribution ==
This marine species occurs in the Atlantic Ocean off Senegal.
