= Raphitoma garlandi =

Scientific classification
- Kingdom: Animalia
- Phylum: Mollusca
- Class: Gastropoda
- Subclass: Caenogastropoda
- Order: Neogastropoda
- Superfamily: Conoidea
- Family: Raphitomidae
- Genus: Raphitoma
- Species: R. garlandi

Binomial name
- Raphitoma garlandi F.W. Harmer, 1918

Synonyms
- † Bela consimilis Glibert, 1960

Extinct species of gastropod

Raphitoma garlandi is an extinct species of sea snail, a marine gastropod mollusc in the family Raphitomidae.

== Distribution ==
Fossils of this extinct marine species were found in Pliocene strata in Suffolk, GB
