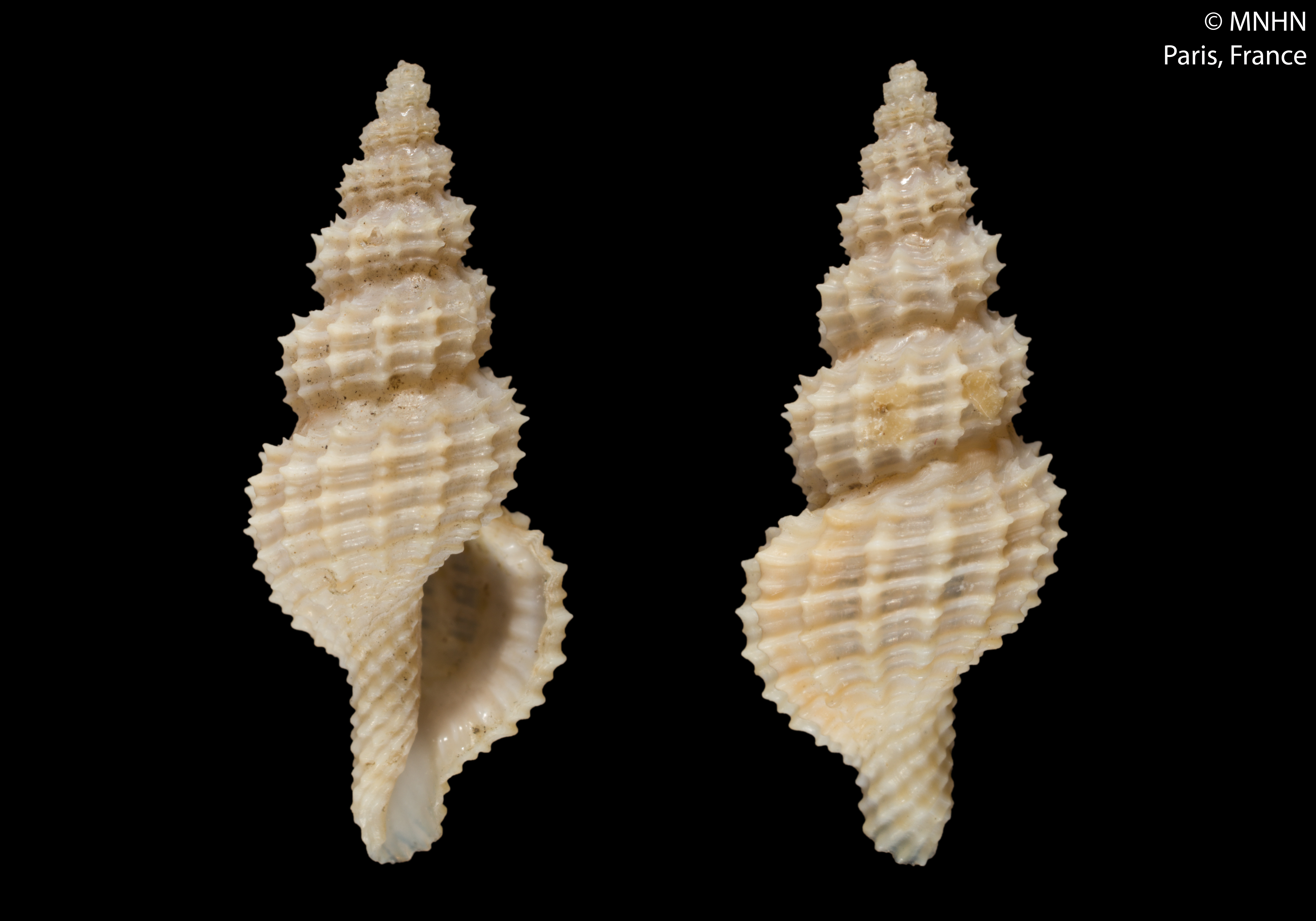
- Shell of Raphitoma cordieri (specimen at MNHN, Paris)

Scientific classification
- Kingdom: Animalia
- Phylum: Mollusca
- Class: Gastropoda
- Subclass: Caenogastropoda
- Order: Neogastropoda
- Superfamily: Conoidea
- Family: Raphitomidae
- Genus: Raphitoma
- Species: R. cordieri

Binomial name
- Raphitoma cordieri (Payraudeau, 1826)

Synonyms
- Clathurella cordieri (Payraudeau, 1826); Clathurella dollfusi Locard, 1886; Cordieria cordieri Monterosato, 1884; Defrancia cordieri Paetel, 1888; Homotoma cordieri Brugnone, 1880; Pleurotoma cordieri Payraudeau, 1826 (original combination); Pleurotoma elegans Blainville, 1829 (dubious synonym); Pleurotoma (Defrancia) cordieri Monterosato, 1875; Raphitoma decorata Locard, 1892; Raphitoma dollfusi Locard, 1886; Raphitoma lineare Réquien, 1848; Raphitoma radula Monterosato, 1884; Raphitoma syracusanum Blainville, 1829

= Raphitoma cordieri =

Species of gastropod

Raphitoma cordieri is a species of sea snail, a marine gastropod mollusk in the family Raphitomidae.

Subspecies

- Raphitoma cordieri hirta Monterosato
- Raphitoma cordieri hispida Monterosato

== Description ==
The length of the shell varies between 12 mm and 20 mm.

The turreted shell is easily recognized by its ribs which, like the transverse striations, are elevated and somewhat lamellous. The color is either black or brown, mixed with white or entirely pink. The seven whorls are convex. The outer lip is wrinkled. The transverse striations extend as far as the columella. The siphonal canal is short and straight.

== Distribution ==
This species occurs in the Mediterranean Sea and off Senegal
