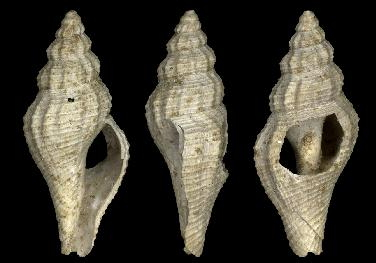
- Shell of † Raphitoma venusta (specimen at MNHN, Paris)

Scientific classification
- Kingdom: Animalia
- Phylum: Mollusca
- Class: Gastropoda
- Subclass: Caenogastropoda
- Order: Neogastropoda
- Superfamily: Conoidea
- Family: Raphitomidae
- Genus: Raphitoma
- Species: †R. venusta

Binomial name
- †Raphitoma venusta (Lea, 1833)

= Raphitoma venusta =

Extinct species of gastropod

Raphitoma venusta is an extinct species of sea snail, a marine gastropod mollusc in the family Raphitomidae.

== Distribution ==
Fossils of this extinct marine species were found in Eocene strata on Alabama, USA.
