= Raphitoma christfriedi =

Scientific classification
- Kingdom: Animalia
- Phylum: Mollusca
- Class: Gastropoda
- Subclass: Caenogastropoda
- Order: Neogastropoda
- Superfamily: Conoidea
- Family: Raphitomidae
- Genus: Raphitoma
- Species: R. christfriedi

Binomial name
- Raphitoma christfriedi Rolan et al, 1998

Species of gastropod

Raphitoma christfriedi is a species of sea snail, a marine gastropod mollusk in the family Raphitomidae.

== Description ==
The length of the shell varies between 10 mm and 14 mm.

== Distribution ==
This marine species occurs off South Angola.
