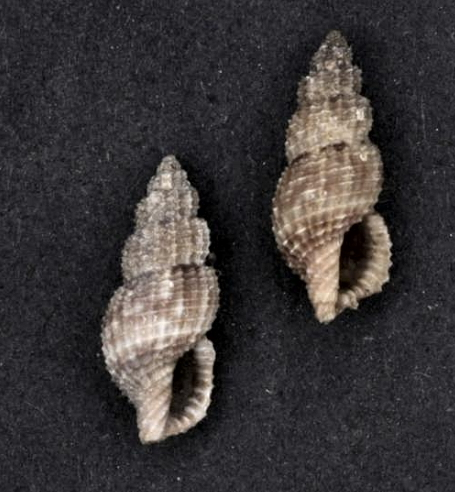
- Shell of Raphitoma pupoides (specimen at Naturalis Biodiversity Center)

Scientific classification
- Kingdom: Animalia
- Phylum: Mollusca
- Class: Gastropoda
- Subclass: Caenogastropoda
- Order: Neogastropoda
- Superfamily: Conoidea
- Family: Raphitomidae
- Genus: Raphitoma
- Species: R. pupoides

Binomial name
- Raphitoma pupoides (Monterosato, 1884)

Synonyms
- Cordiera pupoides Monterosato, 1884; Cyrtoides rudis Scacchi, 1836; Pleurotoma reticulata var. brevis Requien, 1848; Pleurotoma rudis Scacchi, 1836 (Invalid: junior homonym of Pleurotoma rudis G.B. Sowerby I, 1834; Cordieria pupoides and Raphitoma neapolitana are replacement names); Raphitoma (Cyrtoides) rudis (Scacchi, 1836); Raphitoma (Cyrtoides) rudis cylindracea [sic] (misspelling and misidentification of Clathurella cylindrica Locard & Caziot, 1900); Raphitoma brevis Réquien, 1848; Raphitoma neapolitana F. Nordsieck, 1977

= Raphitoma pupoides =

Species of gastropod

Raphitoma pupoides is a species of sea snail, a marine gastropod mollusk in the family Raphitomidae.

== Description ==
The length of the shell varies between 6 mm and 17 mm.

(Original description) It stands out at a glance for its pupoid shape and for its very short siphonal canal, a strongly denticled aperture, oblique and obsolete cross-linking, rapid subtraction, tumid evolutions. The conical apex is composed of many rounded corners, the last of which at angled periphery.

== Distribution ==
This species occurs in the Central Mediterranean Sea and the Canary Islands.
