= Raphitoma digiulioi =

Scientific classification
- Kingdom: Animalia
- Phylum: Mollusca
- Class: Gastropoda
- Subclass: Caenogastropoda
- Order: Neogastropoda
- Superfamily: Conoidea
- Family: Raphitomidae
- Genus: Raphitoma
- Species: R. digiulioi

Binomial name
- Raphitoma digiulioi Pusateri & Giannuzzi Savelli, 2017

Species of gastropod

Raphitoma digiulioi is a species of sea snail, a marine gastropod mollusk in the family Raphitomidae.

== Distribution ==
This species occurs in the Mediterranean Sea off Corsica
