= Raphitoma zelotypa =

Scientific classification
- Kingdom: Animalia
- Phylum: Mollusca
- Class: Gastropoda
- Subclass: Caenogastropoda
- Order: Neogastropoda
- Superfamily: Conoidea
- Family: Raphitomidae
- Genus: Raphitoma
- Species: R. zelotypa

Binomial name
- Raphitoma zelotypa Rolan et al, 1998

Species of gastropod

Raphitoma zelotypa is a species of sea snail, a marine gastropod mollusk in the family Raphitomidae.

== Description ==
The length of the shell varies between 8 mm and 9 mm.

== Distribution ==
This marine species occurs off Angola.
