= Raphitoma curta =

Scientific classification
- Kingdom: Animalia
- Phylum: Mollusca
- Class: Gastropoda
- Subclass: Caenogastropoda
- Order: Neogastropoda
- Superfamily: Conoidea
- Family: Raphitomidae
- Genus: Raphitoma
- Species: R. curta

Binomial name
- Raphitoma curta Fenaux, 1942

Species of gastropod

Raphitoma curta is a species of sea snail, a marine gastropod mollusk in the family Raphitomidae.

This species is a nomen dubium.

== Distribution ==
This species occurs in the Mediterranean Sea.
