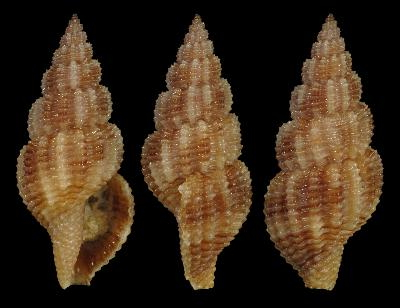
- Shell of Raphitoma sophiae (specimen at MNHN, Paris)

Scientific classification
- Kingdom: Animalia
- Phylum: Mollusca
- Class: Gastropoda
- Subclass: Caenogastropoda
- Order: Neogastropoda
- Superfamily: Conoidea
- Family: Raphitomidae
- Genus: Raphitoma
- Species: R. sophiae

Binomial name
- Raphitoma sophiae Kontadakis & Polyzoulis, 2019

= Raphitoma sophiae =

Species of gastropod

Raphitoma sophiae is a species of sea snail, a marine gastropod mollusk in the family Raphitomidae.

== Description ==
The length of the shell reaches 15.5 mm, its diameter is 6.5 mm.

== Distribution ==
This marine species occurs in the Aegean Sea and in the Sea of Crete.
