= Raphitoma radula =

Scientific classification
- Kingdom: Animalia
- Phylum: Mollusca
- Class: Gastropoda
- Subclass: Caenogastropoda
- Order: Neogastropoda
- Superfamily: Conoidea
- Family: Raphitomidae
- Genus: Raphitoma
- Species: R. radula

Binomial name
- Raphitoma radula (Monterosato, 1884)

Synonyms
- Cordieria radula Monterosato, 1884 (original combination); Clathurella radula de Monterosato, Locard, 1886; Raphitoma reticulata radula Nordsieck, 1968; Raphitoma echinata cordieri form d (radula) Monterosato, Nordsieck, 1977

Species of gastropod

Raphitoma radula is a species of sea snail, a marine gastropod mollusk in the family Raphitomidae.

== Description ==
The length of the shell varies between 12 mm and 19 mm, its diameter is between 4 mm and 8 mm.

== Distribution ==
This species occurs in the Central Mediterranean Sea off Palermo, Sicily; off France, Croatia, and Algeria.
