= Raphitoma consimilis =

Scientific classification
- Kingdom: Animalia
- Phylum: Mollusca
- Class: Gastropoda
- Subclass: Caenogastropoda
- Order: Neogastropoda
- Superfamily: Conoidea
- Family: Raphitomidae
- Genus: Raphitoma
- Species: †R. consimilis

Binomial name
- †Raphitoma consimilis F.W. Harmer, 1918

Synonyms
- † Bela consimilis Glibert, 1960

Extinct species of gastropod

Raphitoma consimilis is an extinct species of sea snail, a marine gastropod mollusc in the family Raphitomidae.

== Distribution ==
Fossils of this extinct marine species were found in Pliocene strata in Suffolk, England.
