= Raphitoma ferrierii =

Scientific classification
- Kingdom: Animalia
- Phylum: Mollusca
- Class: Gastropoda
- Subclass: Caenogastropoda
- Order: Neogastropoda
- Superfamily: Conoidea
- Family: Raphitomidae
- Genus: Raphitoma
- Species: †R. ferrierii

Binomial name
- †Raphitoma ferrierii (Brunetti & Della Bella, 2006)

Synonyms
- Leufroyia ferrierii Brunetti & Della Bella, 2006

Extinct species of gastropod

Raphitoma ferrierii is an extinct species of sea snail, a marine gastropod mollusk in the family Raphitomidae.

== Description ==
The length of the shell reaches 18.5 mm, its diameter 6.5 mm.

== Distribution ==
Fossils of this marine species were found in Early-Middle Pliocene strata in Tuscany, Italy.
