= Raphitoma antonjanseni =

Scientific classification
- Kingdom: Animalia
- Phylum: Mollusca
- Class: Gastropoda
- Subclass: Caenogastropoda
- Order: Neogastropoda
- Superfamily: Conoidea
- Family: Raphitomidae
- Genus: Raphitoma
- Species: R. antonjanseni

Binomial name
- Raphitoma antonjanseni Marquet, 1998

Extinct species of gastropod

Raphitoma antonjanseni is an extinct species of sea snail, a marine gastropod mollusc in the family Raphitomidae.

== Description ==
The length of the shell reaches a length of 16 mm.

== Distribution ==
Fossils of this extinct marine species were found in Pliocene strata near Antwerp, Belgium.
