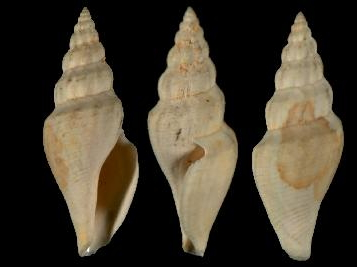
- Shell of Raphitoma costellata (specimen at MNHN, Paris)

Scientific classification
- Kingdom: Animalia
- Phylum: Mollusca
- Class: Gastropoda
- Subclass: Caenogastropoda
- Order: Neogastropoda
- Superfamily: Conoidea
- Family: Raphitomidae
- Genus: Raphitoma
- Species: †R. costellata

Binomial name
- †Raphitoma costellata (Lamarck, 1804)

Synonyms
- † Amblyacrum chevallieri Cossmann, 1889; † Daphnella (Raphitoma) costellata Cossmann, 1896; † Pleurotoma columnella Deshayes, 1865; † Pleurotoma costellata Lamarck, 1804 (original combination); † Pleurotoma costellata brevicauda Lamarck, 1804

= Raphitoma costellata =

Extinct species of gastropod

Raphitoma costellata is an extinct species of sea snail, a marine gastropod mollusc in the family Raphitomidae.

Subspecies

- † Raphitoma costellata bicristata A.E.M. Cossmann & G. Pissarro, 1913
- † Raphitoma costellata capellinii G.P. Deshayes, 1865 (synonym: Pleurotoma capellinii Deshayes, 1865; Raphitoma cappellinii (Deshayes, 1865))
- † Raphitoma costellata coptochetoides (Lamarck, 1804a)
- † Raphitoma costellata pachycolpa Cossmann, 1889

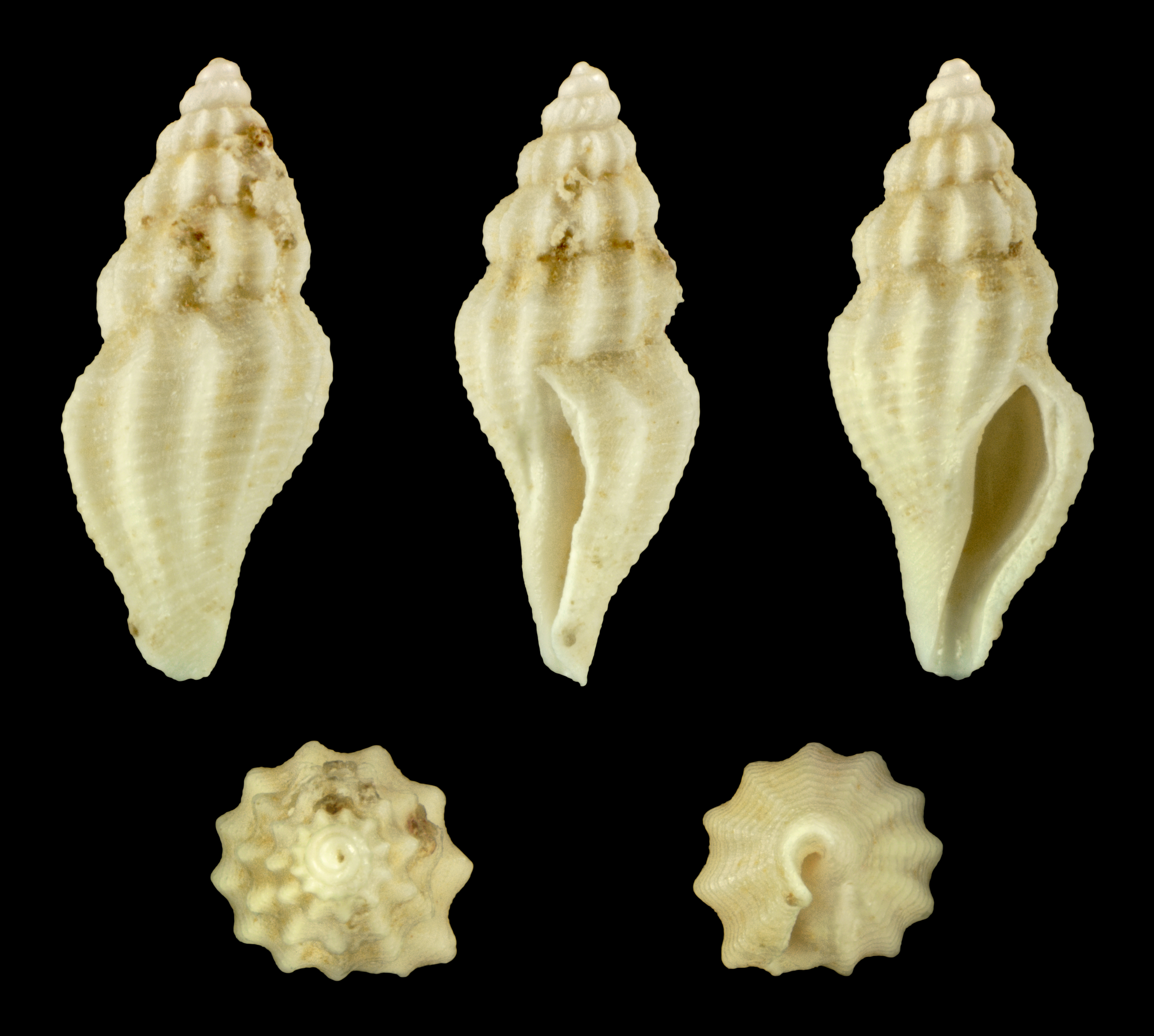
ssp. subattenuata

== Distribution ==
Fossils of this extinct marine species were found in Eocene strata in France.
