= Raphitoma neerrepenensis =

Scientific classification
- Kingdom: Animalia
- Phylum: Mollusca
- Class: Gastropoda
- Subclass: Caenogastropoda
- Order: Neogastropoda
- Superfamily: Conoidea
- Family: Raphitomidae
- Genus: Raphitoma
- Species: †R. neerrepenensis

Binomial name
- †Raphitoma neerrepenensis R. Marquet, Lenaerts & Laporte, 2016

Extinct species of gastropod

Raphitoma neerrepenensis is an extinct species of sea snail, a marine gastropod mollusc in the family Raphitomidae.

== Distribution ==
Fossils of this extinct marine species were found in Early Oligocene strata in Belgium. This species was scientifically described in 2016 by researchers R. Marquet, J. Lenaerts, and J. Laporte in the paper, "A systematic study of the Gastropoda (Mollusca) of the Grimmetingen Sand Member (Early Oligocene) in Belgium."
