= Raphitoma alleryana =

Scientific classification
- Kingdom: Animalia
- Phylum: Mollusca
- Class: Gastropoda
- Subclass: Caenogastropoda
- Order: Neogastropoda
- Superfamily: Conoidea
- Family: Raphitomidae
- Genus: Raphitoma
- Species: R. alleryana

Binomial name
- Raphitoma alleryana (Sulliotti, 1889)

Synonyms
- Clathurella bofilliana (Sulliotti, 1889); Philbertia alleryana Sulliotti, 1889; Philbertia bofilliana Sulliotti, 1889 (original combination); Raphitoma bofilliana (Sulliotti, 1889); Raphitoma (Philbertia) bofilliana (Sulliotti, 1889)

Species of gastropod

Raphitoma alleryana is a species of sea snail, a marine gastropod mollusc in the family Raphitomidae.

== Description ==
The length of the shell reaches a length of 10 mm.

A shell with a minute, elegant fusiform shape, very distinct from its congeners through its sleek appearance produced by the rapidly growing in volume of its 6½ slightly convex whorls, for the subtle reticulation and the low elevation of the ribs which gives it a pearly appearance, and finally for the softness of the shell and its golden-yellow to horny color.. The suture is impressed. The aperture is subovate with a simple outer lip with inconspicuous denticles. The short siphonal canal is slightly inflected. The body whorl shows a conspicuous white submedian band. The smooth apex has a bright, horny color. The columella is almost straight.

== Distribution ==
This marine species occurs in the Western Mediterranean Sea and off Italy and Portugal.
