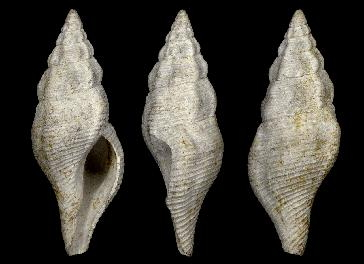
- Shell of Raphitoma lennieri (syntype at MNHN, Parsi)

Scientific classification
- Kingdom: Animalia
- Phylum: Mollusca
- Class: Gastropoda
- Subclass: Caenogastropoda
- Order: Neogastropoda
- Superfamily: Conoidea
- Family: Raphitomidae
- Genus: Raphitoma
- Species: R. lennieri

Binomial name
- Raphitoma lennieri Cossmann & Pissarro, 1900

= Raphitoma lennieri =

Extinct species of gastropod

Raphitoma lennieri is an extinct species of sea snail, a marine gastropod mollusc in the family Raphitomidae.

== Distribution ==
Fossils of this extinct marine species were found in Eocene strata in France.
