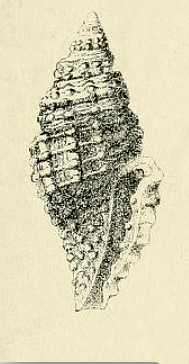
- Original image of a shell of Raphitoma enginaeformis

Scientific classification
- Kingdom: Animalia
- Phylum: Mollusca
- Class: Gastropoda
- Subclass: Caenogastropoda
- Order: Neogastropoda
- Superfamily: Conoidea
- Family: Raphitomidae
- Genus: Raphitoma
- Species: R. enginaeformis

Binomial name
- Raphitoma enginaeformis (G. & H. Nevill, 1875)

Synonyms
- Clathurella enginaeformis G. & H. Nevill, 1875 (dubious synonym)

= Raphitoma enginaeformis =

Species of mollusc

Raphitoma enginaeformis is a species of sea snail, a marine gastropod mollusk in the family Raphitomidae.

== Description ==
The shell reaches a length of 5½ mm and a diameter of 2½ mm.

(Original description) The shell is narrowly elongate, convex, in shape resembling several species of the genus Engina Gray, 1839. The shell is peculiarly attenuated and contracted towards the base, the spire pointed. The color of the shell is white, banded with a single somewhat irregular yellow band, repeated a little below the middle of the body whorl. Some of the granules on this band are yellow, whilst others are white. The shell contains seven whorls, distantly reticulated with thick, obtuse, longitudinal and transverse keels. The interstices, under a lens, are minutely and closely longitudinally striated. The sculpture is very distinct and clearly marked on the last two whorls, but much confused and difficult to trace on the upper ones. Pearl-like granules are formed where the ridges cross one another, in the present shell however they are more regular in size and more rounded. There are three rows of these granules on each whorl, besides an additional smaller one and some indistinct transverse ridges close to the suture. There are ten longitudinal keels on the body whorl. The sinus is deep, but rather contracted, bent down rather abruptly. The aperture is very straight and narrow, suddenly widening a little close to the end of the siphonal canal. There are seven rather large regular granules at the inner margin of the outer lip.

== Distribution ==
This marine species occurs in the Indian Ocean off Sri Lanka
