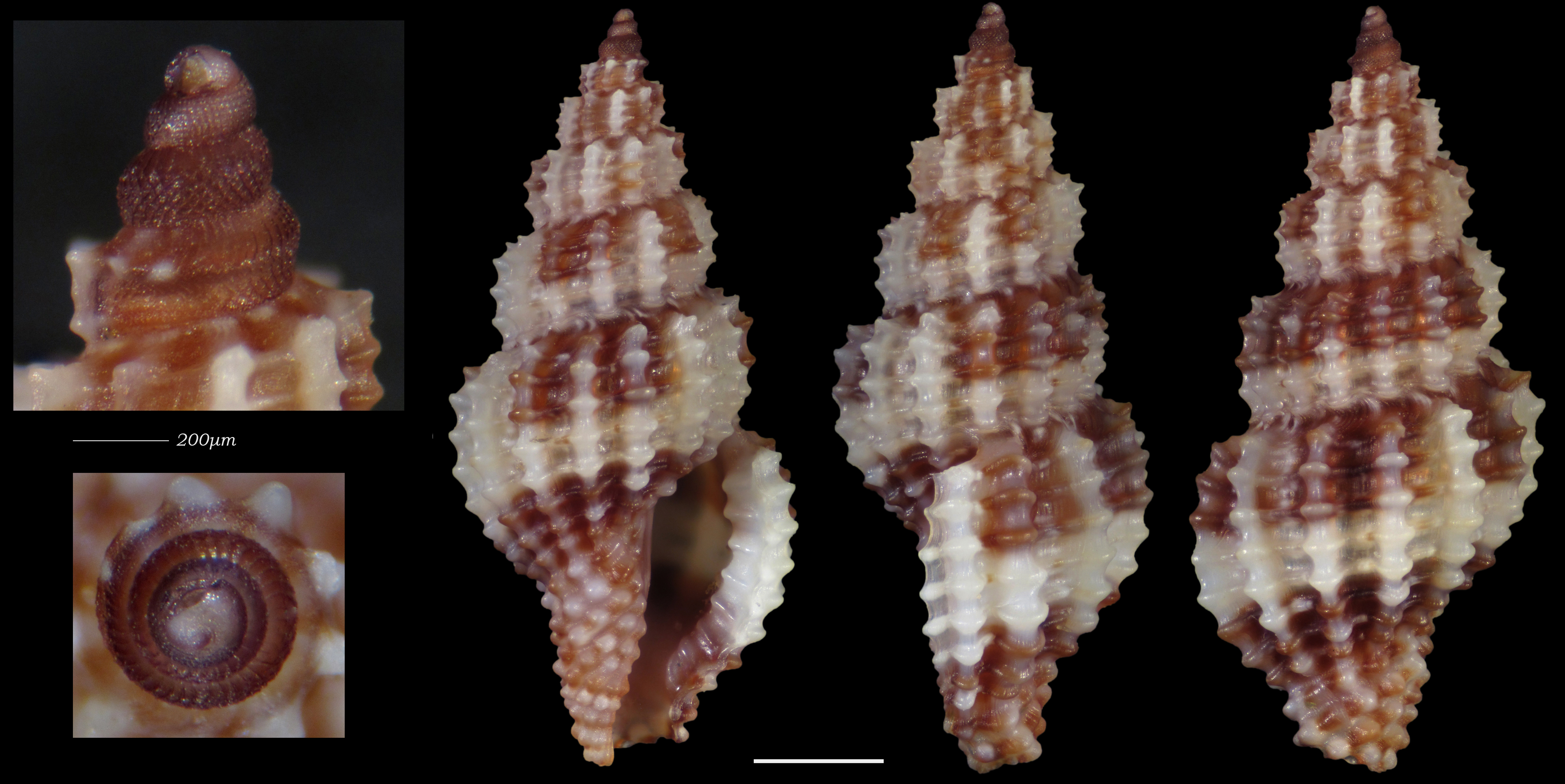
- Shell of Raphitoma melitis (holotype at MNHN, Paris)

Scientific classification
- Kingdom: Animalia
- Phylum: Mollusca
- Class: Gastropoda
- Subclass: Caenogastropoda
- Order: Neogastropoda
- Superfamily: Conoidea
- Family: Raphitomidae
- Genus: Raphitoma
- Species: R. melitis

Binomial name
- Raphitoma melitis Kontadakis & Mbazios, 2019

= Raphitoma melitis =

Species of gastropod

Raphitoma melitis is a species of sea snail, a marine gastropod mollusk in the family Raphitomidae.

== Description ==
The length of the shell attains 6.9 mm.

== Distribution ==
This marine species occurs in the Aegean Sea
