= Raphitoma tomentosa =

Scientific classification
- Kingdom: Animalia
- Phylum: Mollusca
- Class: Gastropoda
- Subclass: Caenogastropoda
- Order: Neogastropoda
- Superfamily: Conoidea
- Family: Raphitomidae
- Genus: Raphitoma
- Species: R. tomentosa

Binomial name
- Raphitoma tomentosa F. Nordsieck, 1968

Synonyms
- Raphitoma (Raphitoma) philberti tomentosa (var.) (F. Nordsieck, 1968)

Species of gastropod

Raphitoma tomentosa is a species of sea snail, a marine gastropod mollusk in the family Raphitomidae.

This is a taxon inquirendum.
