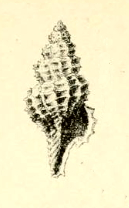
- Original image of a shell of Raphitoma mirabilis

Scientific classification
- Kingdom: Animalia
- Phylum: Mollusca
- Class: Gastropoda
- Subclass: Caenogastropoda
- Order: Neogastropoda
- Superfamily: Conoidea
- Family: Raphitomidae
- Genus: Raphitoma
- Species: R. mirabilis

Binomial name
- Raphitoma mirabilis (Pallary, 1904)

Synonyms
- Homotoma mirabilis Pallary, 1904 (original combination); Philbertia mirabilis (Pallary, 1904); Raphitoma (Raphitoma) mirabilis (Pallary, 1904); Raphitoma pallaryi F. Nordsieck, 1977

= Raphitoma mirabilis =

Species of mollusc

Raphitoma mirabilis is a species of sea snail, a marine gastropod mollusk in the family Raphitomidae.

== Description ==
The length of the shell reaches 9 mm.

The very slender, fusiform, turriculate shell has a high spire and a pointed apex. It contains 7 convex whorls, of which two in the protoconch. They show longitudinal ribs, lamellar, spaced, narrow, elevated, and smaller decurrent threads forming a reticulation with nodules. The aperture is ovate and measures a little less than half the length of the shell. The siphonal canal is rather long. The columella is straight and slightly twisted at the base. The rounded outer lip is thin, not wrinkled and notched at the edge of the suture. The ground color of the shell is reddish brown on which the reticulation comes off in white.

== Distribution ==
This marine species occurs off Tunisia.
