= Raphitoma birmanica =

Scientific classification
- Kingdom: Animalia
- Phylum: Mollusca
- Class: Gastropoda
- Subclass: Caenogastropoda
- Order: Neogastropoda
- Superfamily: Conoidea
- Family: Raphitomidae
- Genus: Raphitoma
- Species: R. birmanica

Binomial name
- Raphitoma birmanica (E.W. Vredenburg, 1921)

Synonyms
- † Cytharella birmanica Shuto, 1984 (doubtful synonym); † Daphnella (Raphitoma) birmanica Vredenburg 1921

Extinct species of gastropod

Raphitoma birmanica is an extinct species of sea snail, a marine gastropod mollusc in the family Raphitomidae.

== Distribution ==
Fossils of this extinct marine species were found in Miocene strata in Myanmar; age range: 23.03 to 20.43 Ma
