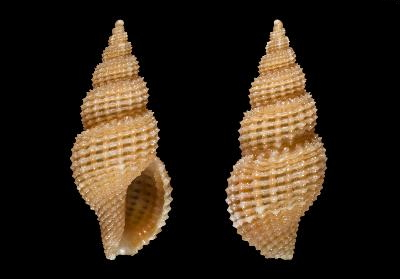
- Shell of Raphitoma spadiana (holotype in MNHN, Paris)

Scientific classification
- Kingdom: Animalia
- Phylum: Mollusca
- Class: Gastropoda
- Subclass: Caenogastropoda
- Order: Neogastropoda
- Superfamily: Conoidea
- Family: Raphitomidae
- Genus: Raphitoma
- Species: R. spadiana

Binomial name
- Raphitoma spadiana Pusateri & Giannuzzi-Savelli, 2012

= Raphitoma spadiana =

Species of mollusc

Raphitoma skylla is a species of sea snail, a marine gastropod mollusk in the family Raphitomidae.

== Description ==
The length of the shell attains 9.6 mm.

== Distribution ==
This marine species occurs in the Mediterranean Sea off the Lipari Islands, Italy.
