= Raphitoma michaudi =

Scientific classification
- Kingdom: Animalia
- Phylum: Mollusca
- Class: Gastropoda
- Subclass: Caenogastropoda
- Order: Neogastropoda
- Superfamily: Conoidea
- Family: Raphitomidae
- Genus: Raphitoma
- Species: R. michaudi

Binomial name
- Raphitoma michaudi (Bellardi, 1877)

Synonyms
- Homotoma michaudi Bellardi, 1877

Extinct species of gastropod

Raphitoma michaudi is an extinct species of sea snail, a marine gastropod mollusc in the family Raphitomidae.

== Description ==
The length of the shell reaches 14 mm, its diameter 6.5 mm.

== Distribution ==
Fossils of this extinct marine species were found in Lower Pliocene strata in Italy
