= Raphitoma daphnelloides =

Scientific classification
- Kingdom: Animalia
- Phylum: Mollusca
- Class: Gastropoda
- Subclass: Caenogastropoda
- Order: Neogastropoda
- Superfamily: Conoidea
- Family: Raphitomidae
- Genus: Raphitoma
- Species: †R. daphnelloides

Binomial name
- †Raphitoma daphnelloides Gougerot & Le Renard, 1981

Synonyms
- † Raphitoma (Amblyacrum) perplexa daphnelloides (Deshayes, 1865)

Extinct species of gastropod

Raphitoma daphnelloides is an extinct species of sea snail, a marine gastropod mollusc in the family Raphitomidae.

== Distribution ==
Fossils of this extinct marine species were found in Eocene strata in France; age range: 40.4 to 37.2 Ma
