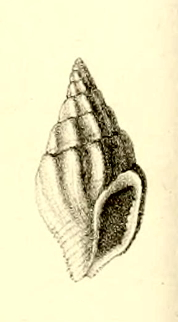
- Original image of a shell of Raphitoma hoernesi

Scientific classification
- Kingdom: Animalia
- Phylum: Mollusca
- Class: Gastropoda
- Subclass: Caenogastropoda
- Order: Neogastropoda
- Superfamily: Conoidea
- Family: Raphitomidae
- Genus: Raphitoma
- Species: †R. hoernesi

Binomial name
- †Raphitoma hoernesi (C. Mayer, 1869)

Synonyms
- Columbella hoernesi C. Mayer, 1869

= Raphitoma hoernesi =

Extinct species of gastropod

Raphitoma hoernesi is an extinct species of sea snail, a marine gastropod mollusc in the family Raphitomidae.

== Description ==
The length of the shell attains 14 mm, its diameter 7 mm.

The oblong-clavate shell is thick and solid. The conical spire is acuminate and contains eight narrow whorls. The whorls show nine, pronounced, straight longitudinal ribs positioned at equal and regular intervals, becoming slightly nodulous at the suture. The interstices are somewhat larger and slightly cut across by striae. The body whorl is somewhat smaller than the spire. The siphonal canal is short, narrow and somewhat twisted. The outer lip is incrassate and inside denticulate. The columella is wrinkled.

== Distribution ==
Fossils of this extinct marine species were found in Miocene strata in Aquitaine, France.
