= Raphitoma desmoulinsi =

Scientific classification
- Kingdom: Animalia
- Phylum: Mollusca
- Class: Gastropoda
- Subclass: Caenogastropoda
- Order: Neogastropoda
- Superfamily: Conoidea
- Family: Raphitomidae
- Genus: Raphitoma
- Species: †R. desmoulinsi

Binomial name
- †Raphitoma desmoulinsi L.M.D. Bellardi, 1847

Synonyms
- Belidaphne desmouilinsi (sic) Vera-Peláez, 2002; Bellardiella desmoulinsi Sacco, 1904; Daphnella (Bellardiella) desmoulinsi Cossmann, 1896; Defrancia desmoulinsi Seguenza, 1875; Homotoma desmoulinsi Bellardi, 1877; † Pleurotoma desmoulinsi Studer, 1853; Pleurotoma (Bellardiella) desmoulinsi Dollfus, 1906

Extinct species of gastropod

Raphitoma desmoulinsi is an extinct species of sea snail, a marine gastropod mollusc in the family Raphitomidae.

== Description ==
The length of the shell reaches 15 mm.

== Distribution ==
Fossils of this extinct marine species were found in Upper Pliocene strata in Emilia, Italy.
