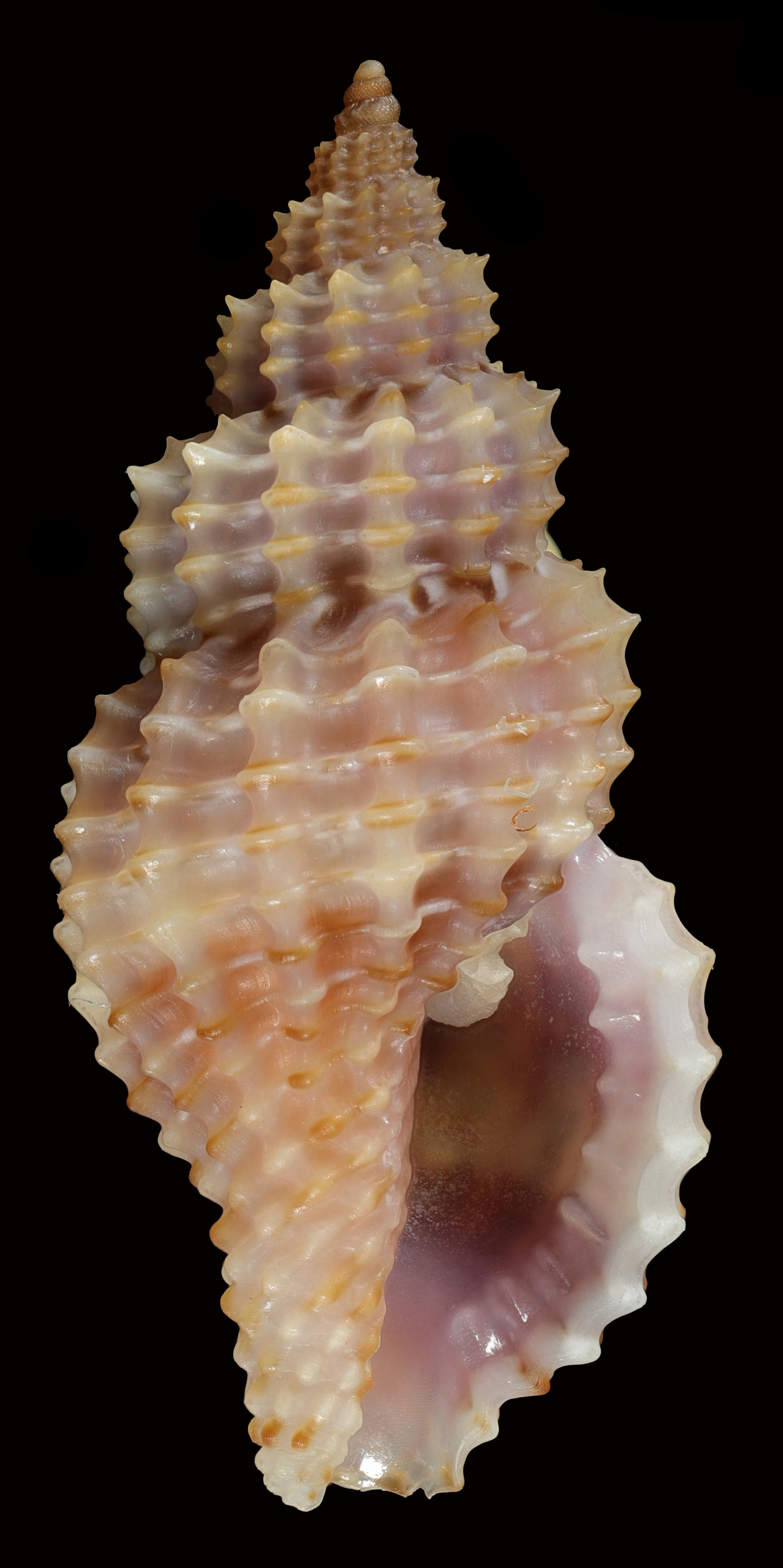
- Shell of Raphitoma andrehoaraui (holotype at MNHN, Paris)

Scientific classification
- Kingdom: Animalia
- Phylum: Mollusca
- Class: Gastropoda
- Subclass: Caenogastropoda
- Order: Neogastropoda
- Superfamily: Conoidea
- Family: Raphitomidae
- Genus: Raphitoma
- Species: R. andrehoaraui

Binomial name
- Raphitoma andrehoaraui Pelorce & Horst, 2020

= Raphitoma andrehoaraui =

Species of gastropod

Raphitoma andrehoaraui is a species of sea snail, a marine gastropod mollusc in the family Raphitomidae.

== Description ==
The length of the shell attains 9.3 mm.

== Distribution ==
This marine species was found off France in the Mediterranean Sea.
