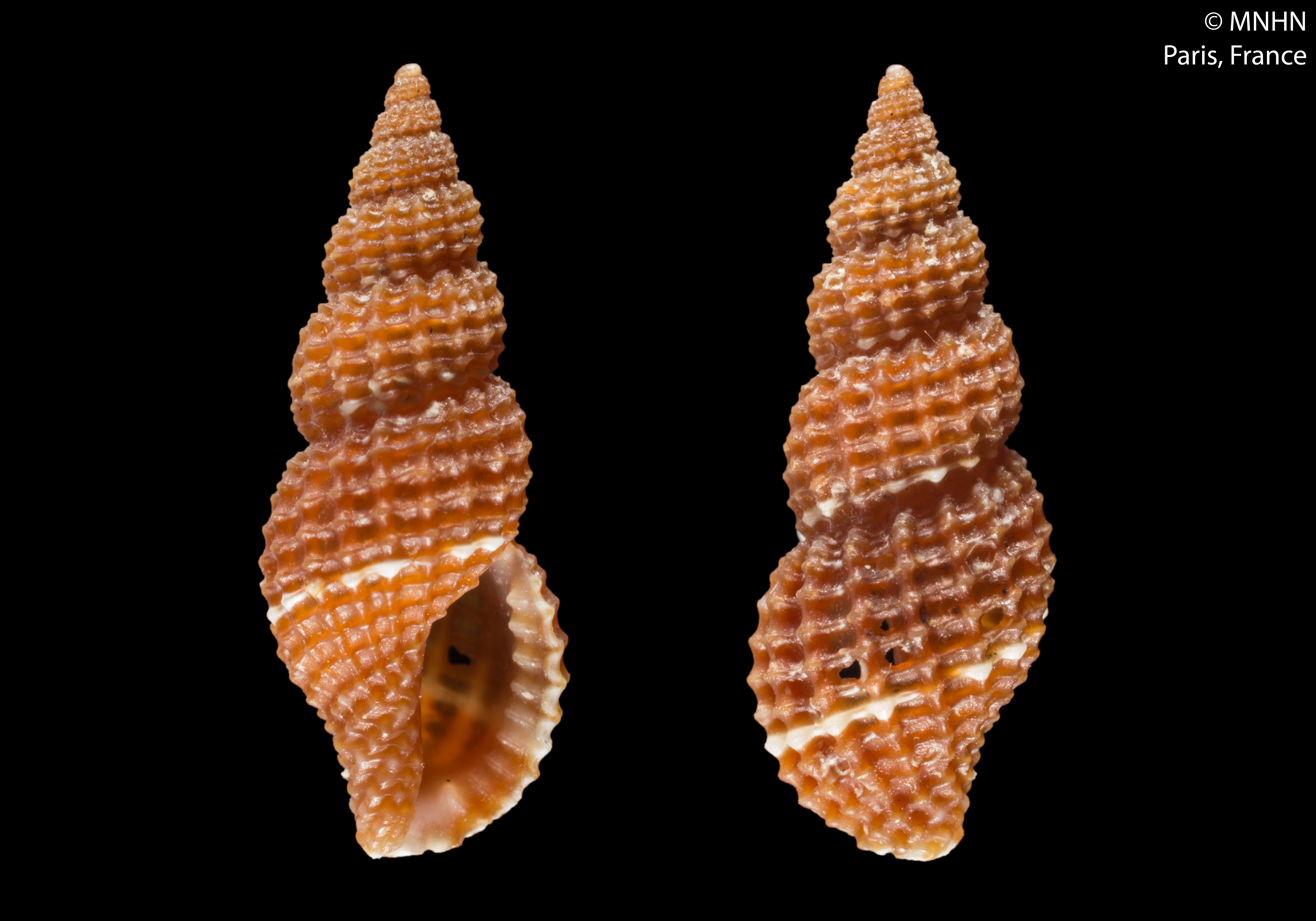
- Shell of Raphitoma contigua (paralectotype at MNHN, Paris)

Scientific classification
- Kingdom: Animalia
- Phylum: Mollusca
- Class: Gastropoda
- Subclass: Caenogastropoda
- Order: Neogastropoda
- Superfamily: Conoidea
- Family: Raphitomidae
- Genus: Raphitoma
- Species: R. contigua

Binomial name
- Raphitoma contigua (Monterosato, 1884)

Synonyms
- Clathurella contigua Locard, 1886; Defrancia contigua Paetel, 1888; Philbertia contigua Monterosato, 1884 (original combination); Philbertia cordieri (Payraudeau, 1826); Pleurotomoides (Pleurotomoides) contigua Stolfa Zucchi, 1971; Raphitoma purpurea philberti Bucquoy, EJ, Ph. Dautzenberg & GF Dollfus, 1882

= Raphitoma contigua =

Species of gastropod

Raphitoma contigua is a species of sea snail, a marine gastropod mollusc in the family Raphitomidae.

== Description ==
The length of the shell varies between 5 mm and 12 mm.

== Distribution ==
This marine species occurs in the Mediterranean Sea.
