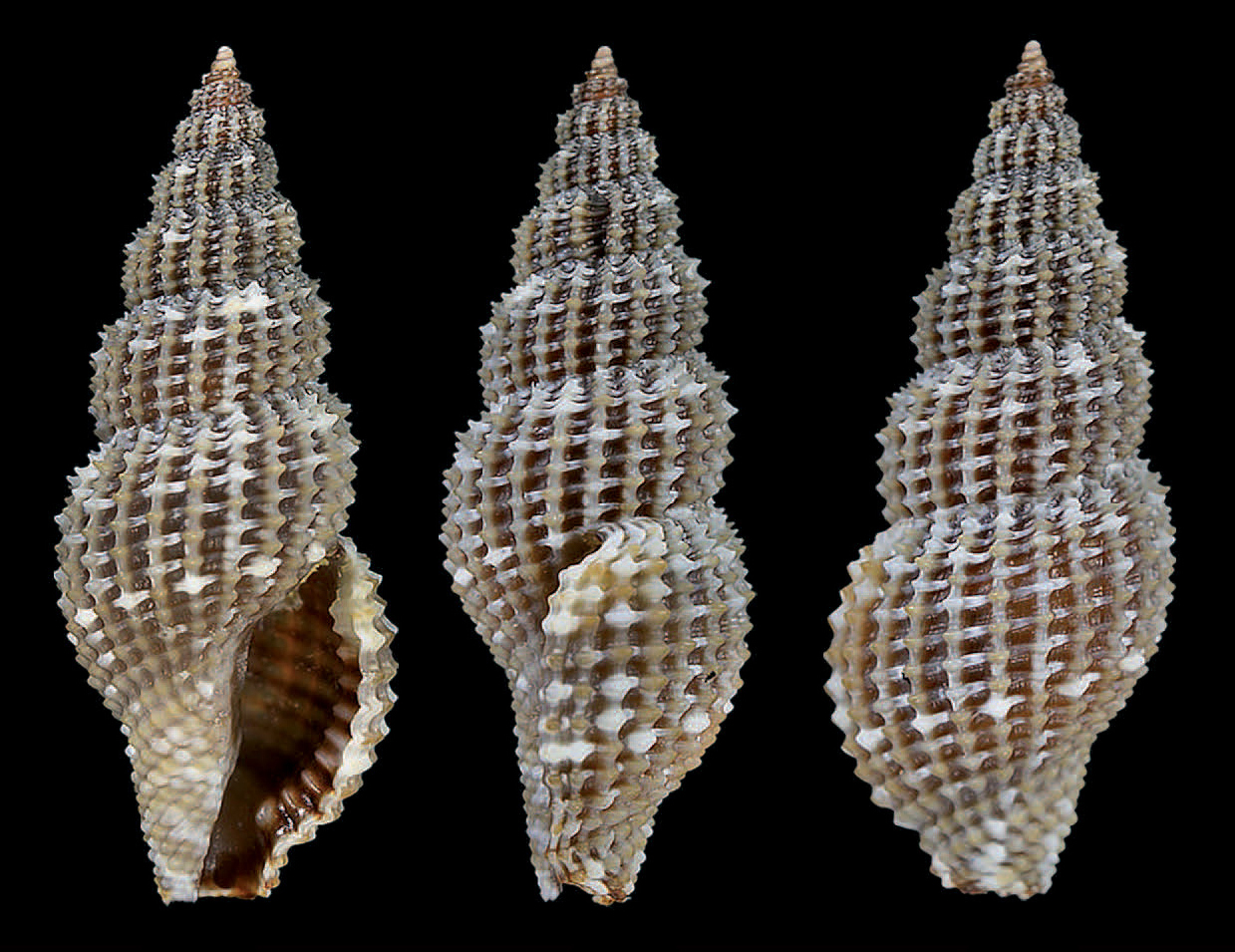
- Shell of Raphitoma petanii (holotype at MNHN, Paris)

Scientific classification
- Kingdom: Animalia
- Phylum: Mollusca
- Class: Gastropoda
- Subclass: Caenogastropoda
- Order: Neogastropoda
- Superfamily: Conoidea
- Family: Raphitomidae
- Genus: Raphitoma
- Species: R. petanii

Binomial name
- Raphitoma petanii Prkić, Giannuzzi-Savelli & Pusateri, 2020

= Raphitoma petanii =

Species of gastropod

Raphitoma petanii is a species of sea snail, a marine gastropod mollusk in the family Raphitomidae.

== Distribution ==
This marine species occurs in the Croatian part of the Adriatic Sea.
