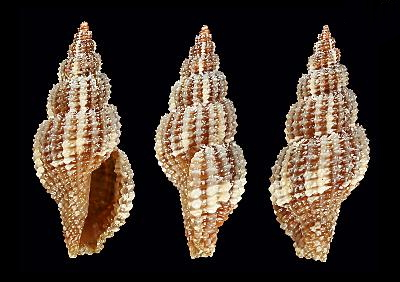
- Shell of Raphitoma ebreorum (holotype in MNHN, Paris)

Scientific classification
- Kingdom: Animalia
- Phylum: Mollusca
- Class: Gastropoda
- Subclass: Caenogastropoda
- Order: Neogastropoda
- Superfamily: Conoidea
- Family: Raphitomidae
- Genus: Raphitoma
- Species: R. ebreorum

Binomial name
- Raphitoma ebreorum Pusateri & Giannuzzi-Savelli, 2018

= Raphitoma ebreorum =

Species of mollusc

Raphitoma ebreorum is a species of sea snail, a marine gastropod mollusk in the family Raphitomidae.

== Description ==
The length of the shell attains 8 mm.

== Distribution ==
This marine species occurs in the Mediterranean Sea off Djerba, Tunisia.
