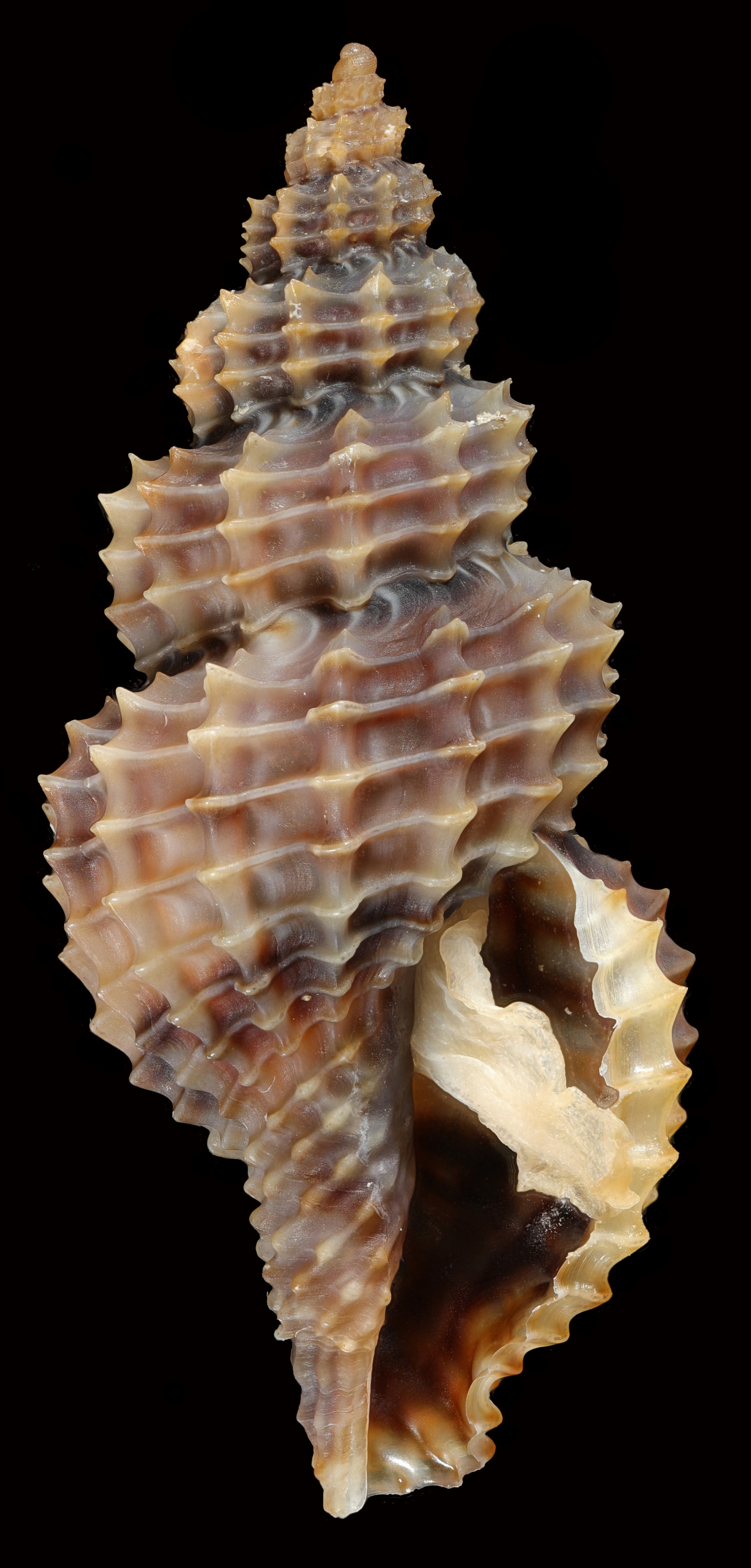
- Shell of Raphitoma azuari (holotype at MNHN, Paris)

Scientific classification
- Kingdom: Animalia
- Phylum: Mollusca
- Class: Gastropoda
- Subclass: Caenogastropoda
- Order: Neogastropoda
- Superfamily: Conoidea
- Family: Raphitomidae
- Genus: Raphitoma
- Species: R. azuari

Binomial name
- Raphitoma azuari Pelorce & Horst, 2020

= Raphitoma azuari =

Species of gastropod

Raphitoma azuari is a species of sea snail, a marine gastropod mollusc in the family Raphitomidae.

== Description ==
The length of the shell attains 12.6 mm. The sculpture (relief) of the shell consists of approximately 16 to 20 axial ribs, crossed by 16 to 20 finer spiral cords, with 5 to 7 above the suture. The intersection of these cords forms elongated and pointed nodules, especially on the early whorls, giving the shell a spiny appearance

== Distribution ==
This marine species was found off France in the Mediterranean Sea.

== Sources ==
- Pelorce J. & Horst D. (2020). Raphitoma echinata (Brocchi, 1814) et Raphitoma echinata sensu auctores sur la côte méditerranéenne du département des Alpes-Maritimes (France). Xenophora Taxonomy. 28: 28–35.
