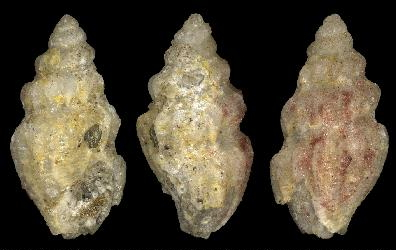
- Shell of † Raphitoma symmetrica (specimen at MNHN, Paris)

Scientific classification
- Kingdom: Animalia
- Phylum: Mollusca
- Class: Gastropoda
- Subclass: Caenogastropoda
- Order: Neogastropoda
- Superfamily: Conoidea
- Family: Raphitomidae
- Genus: Raphitoma
- Species: †R. symmetrica

Binomial name
- †Raphitoma symmetrica (Reeve, 1846)

= Raphitoma symmetrica =

Extinct species of gastropod

Raphitoma symmetrica is an extinct species of sea snail, a marine gastropod mollusc in the family Raphitomidae.

== Distribution ==
Fossils of this extinct marine species were found in Miocene strata on Martinique.
