= Raphitoma volutella =

Scientific classification
- Kingdom: Animalia
- Phylum: Mollusca
- Class: Gastropoda
- Subclass: Caenogastropoda
- Order: Neogastropoda
- Superfamily: Conoidea
- Family: Raphitomidae
- Genus: Raphitoma
- Species: R. volutella

Binomial name
- Raphitoma volutella (Kiener, 1840)

Synonyms
- Pleurotoma volutella Kiener, 1840

Species of gastropod

Raphitoma volutella is a species of sea snail, a marine gastropod mollusk in the family Raphitomidae.

== Description ==
This is a Plio-Pleistocene species
