= Raphitoma eberti =

Scientific classification
- Kingdom: Animalia
- Phylum: Mollusca
- Class: Gastropoda
- Subclass: Caenogastropoda
- Order: Neogastropoda
- Superfamily: Conoidea
- Family: Raphitomidae
- Genus: Raphitoma
- Species: †R. eberti

Binomial name
- †Raphitoma eberti A. von Koenen, 1894

Extinct species of gastropod

Raphitoma eberti is an extinct species of sea snail, a marine gastropod mollusc in the family Raphitomidae. It was originally described by von Koenen in 1894 and is known exclusively from fossil material.

== Description ==
The shell of Raphitoma eberti reaches a length of approximately 7 mm. Like other members of its genus, it is characterized by a slender, elongated profile with pronounced spiral sculpture and axial ribs, creating a finely reticulate surface.

The aperture is narrow, and the siphonal canal is moderately extended. These features are typical of Raphitomidae, a family known for predatory behavior and well-defined shell ornamentation.

== Distribution ==
Fossils of Raphitoma eberti have been recovered from Eocene deposits in Dnipropetrovsk, Ukraine. These strata are dated to the middle to late Eocene, a time of active marine diversification in the Tethyan and Paratethyan basins.
