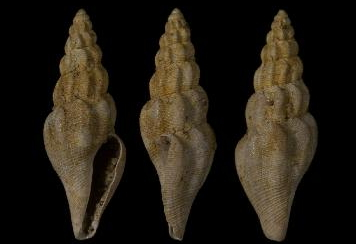
- Shell of † Raphitoma striolaris (specimen at MNHN, Pqris)

Scientific classification
- Kingdom: Animalia
- Phylum: Mollusca
- Class: Gastropoda
- Subclass: Caenogastropoda
- Order: Neogastropoda
- Superfamily: Conoidea
- Family: Raphitomidae
- Genus: Raphitoma
- Species: †R. striolaris

Binomial name
- †Raphitoma striolaris (Deshayes, 1837)

= Raphitoma striolaris =

Extinct species of gastropod

Raphitoma striolaris is an extinct species of sea snail, a marine gastropod mollusc in the family Raphitomidae.

== Description ==
The length of the shell attains 11 mm.

Spire scalariform; whorls separated by a deep, undulating suture; subsutural ramp adorned with whitish commas (« albo-virgulatae » in Monterosato); sculpture made of few, sharp, raised spiral ridges running upon even fewer radial costae, giving the shell a clathrate appearance. Shallow water, north of the harbor, east of the bridge, along the Avenue des Étangs, Frontignan-plage, Occitania. Original picture provided by J. Renoult for iNaturalist (CC BY-NC).

== Distribution ==
Fossils of this extinct marine species were found in Eocene strata in France.
