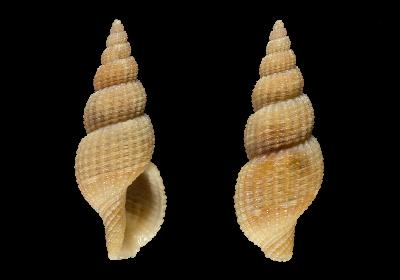
- Shells of Raphitoma bourguignati (syntype in the MNHN, Paris)

Scientific classification
- Kingdom: Animalia
- Phylum: Mollusca
- Class: Gastropoda
- Subclass: Caenogastropoda
- Order: Neogastropoda
- Superfamily: Conoidea
- Family: Raphitomidae
- Genus: Raphitoma; Luigi Bellardi, 1848

Type species
- † Pleurotoma hystrix de Cristofori & Jan, 1832

Species
- See text

Synonyms
- Cenodagreutes E.H. Smith, 1967; Cirillia Monterosato, 1884 (Invalid: junior homonym of Cirillia Rondani, 1856 [Diptera]; Cyrillia is an emendation and Lineotoma is a replacement names); Cordieria Monterosato, 1884 (invalid: junior homonym of Cordieria Rouault, 1848); Cyrtoides F. Nordsieck, 1968; Daphnella (Raphitoma) Bellardi, 1847; Homotoma Bellardi, 1875 (Invalid: junior homonym of Homotoma Guérin-Méneville, 1844 [Hemiptera]; Peratotoma is a replacement name); Lineotoma F. Nordsieck, 1977; Mangilia (Raphitoma); Peratotoma G. F. Harris & Burrows, 1891; Philbertia Monterosato, 1884; Raphitoma (Cyrtoides) F. Nordsieck, 1968; Raphitoma (Leufroyia) Monterosato, 1884; Raphitoma (Philbertia) Monterosato, 1884; Raphitoma (Raphitoma) Bellardi, 1847; Rhaphitoma (sic)

= Raphitoma =

Genus of gastropods

Raphitoma is a genus of sea snails, marine gastropod mollusks in the family Raphitomidae.

The type species Pleurotoma hystrix Cristofori and Jan, 1832 is a nomen nudum. It has been validated by Bellardi, 1847 as “Pleurotoma histrix Jan.”

== Distribution ==
This genus occurs in European waters, in the northern part of the Mediterranean Sea, and in the Atlantic Ocean off Cape Verde, West Africa and Angola.

== Taxonomy history ==
The genus Raphitoma was created in 1847 by Luigi Bellardi (1818-1889) in his "Monographie des Pleurotomes fossiles du Piémont" for species in different groups without operculum.

Raphitoma now contains many species formerly assigned to Pleurotoma Lamarck, 1799, Clathurella (Carpenter, 1857) and Philbertia (Monterosato, 1884). Philbertia was synonymized with Raphitoma in 1990 because Dr. Philippe Bouchet did not consider valid the subdivision of species into different genera solely on the basis of differences during larval development.

In describing Raphitoma, the World Register of Marine Species (WoRMS) relied on an unpublished database "Nomenclator of Molluscan Supraspecific Names" by Bouchet P. & Rocroi J.-P. (2010). In December 2011, the WoRMS database still showed 21 species retaining the genus name Philbertia. In their publication "A new operational classification of the Conoidea (Gastropoda)", Bouchet, Kantor et al. (2011) still recognize Philbertia as a valid genus in the Raphitomidae.

As of the 2017 update to the 2005 restructuring of gastropod taxonomy, WoRMS recognizes Philbertia as a synonym of Raphitoma.

== Description ==
According to Giannuzzi-Savelli et al. (2018), the shell of the species in this genus are characterized by:

- shape: turreted to biconic-pupoidal with an impressed suture.
- size: small to medium (5 mm to 25 mm) compared with the other genera in this family
- protoconch: 3 to 4.5 whorls when multispiral (planktotrophic development) - otherwise paucispiral (lecithotrophic development) - this dichotomy of the larval development between sibling species can be used in distinguishing them).
- body whorl: frequently keeled.
- Sculpture: reticulate and diagonally squarely cancellated with the axial opisthocline ribs broader than the spiral riblets; sometimes growth lines visible between the ribs on the body whorl.
- outer lip: thickened, showing inner denticles; crenulated externally.
- columella: simple; sometimes slightly sinuous anteriorly.
- siphonal canal: funnel-like; short to rather long; wide.

Data about the soft parts are scarce and suggest a variation between the species.

== Species ==
Species within the genus Raphitoma include:

- † Raphitoma alfurica P. J. Fischer, 1927
- † Raphitoma alida Pusateri & Giannuzzi-Savelli, 2016
- Raphitoma alleryana (Sulliotti, 1889)
- Raphitoma alternans (Monterosato, 1884)
- Raphitoma andrehoaraui Pelorce & Horst, 2020
- Raphitoma antipolitana Pelorce & Horst, 2020
- † Raphitoma antonjanseni Marquet, 1998
- † Raphitoma arenosa Lozouet, 2017
- Raphitoma arnoldi Pallary, 1904
- † Raphitoma asperata Lozouet, 2017
- Raphitoma atropurpurea (Locard & Caziot, 1900)
- † Raphitoma augustae (Boettger, 1902)
- Raphitoma azuari Pelorce & Horst, 2020
- Raphitoma bartolinorum Pusateri & Giannuzzi-Savelli, 2018
- † Raphitoma baudoni (G.P. Deshayes, 1865 )
- † Raphitoma belliana Finlay, 1927
- Raphitoma bernardoi Rolán, Otero-Schmitt & Fernandes, 1998
- Raphitoma bicolor (Risso, 1826)
- † Raphitoma birmanica Vredenburg, 1921
- † Raphitoma boutillieri Cossmann, 1889
- Raphitoma bourguignati (Locard, 1891)
- Raphitoma bracteata (Pallary, 1904)
- † Raphitoma breitenbergeri Landau, Van Dingenen & Ceulemans, 2020
- Raphitoma brunneofasciata Pusateri, Giannuzzi-Savelli & Oliverio, 2013
- Raphitoma caboverdensis Espinosa & Ortea, 2021
- Raphitoma christfriedi Rolan et al., 1998
- † Raphitoma columnae (Scacchi, 1835)
- † Raphitoma consimilis F.W. Harmer, 1918
- Raphitoma contigua (Monterosato, 1884)
- Raphitoma corbis (Potiez & Michaud, 1838)
- Raphitoma cordieri (Payraudeau, 1826)
- † Raphitoma costellata (J.B.P.A. Lamarck, 1804)
- Raphitoma curta Fenaux, 1942 (nomen dubium)
- † Raphitoma daphnelloides Gougerot & Le Renard, 1981
- † Raphitoma dellabellaorum Landau, Van Dingenen & Ceulemans, 2020
- Raphitoma dempsta (A.A. Gould, 1860)
- Raphitoma densa (Monterosato, 1884)
- † Raphitoma deshayesi Cossmann, 1902
- † Raphitoma desmoulinsi Bellardi, 1847
- † Raphitoma dictyella Cossmann, 1889
- Raphitoma digiulioi Pusateri & Giannuzzi Savelli, 2017
- † Raphitoma diozodes Cossmann, 1898
- † Raphitoma eberti Koenen, 1894
- Raphitoma ebreorum Pusateri & Giannuzzi-Savelli, 2018
- Raphitoma echinata (Brocchi, 1814)
- † Raphitoma echinus (Boettger, 1902)
- Raphitoma enginaeformis Nevill & Nevill, 1875
- † Raphitoma erinaceus (Bellardi, 1877)
- † Raphitoma exasperata Lozouet, 2017
- Raphitoma farolita F. Nordsieck, 1977
- † Raphitoma ferrierii (Brunetti, Della-Bella & Giano, 2006)
- † Raphitoma ferroviae Cossmann, 1923
- † Raphitoma fischeri Cossmann, 1902
- Raphitoma formosa (Jeffreys, 1867)
- † Raphitoma gabusogana Nomura & Zinbo, 1936
- † Raphitoma ganensis Cossmann, 1923
- † Raphitoma garlandi Harmer, 1918
- † Raphitoma grimmertingenensis Marquet, Lenaerts & Laporte, 2016
- Raphitoma griseomaculata Pusateri & Giannuzzi-Savelli, 2018
- † Raphitoma harpula (G.B. Brocchi, 1814 )
- † Raphitoma herminae (Boettger, 1902)
- † Raphitoma hildae (Boettger, 1902)
- Raphitoma hispidella Giannuzzi-Savelli & Pusateri, 2019
- † Raphitoma histrix Bellardi, 1847
- † Raphitoma hoernesi (Mayer, 1869)
- Raphitoma horrida (Monterosato, 1884)
- † Raphitoma hypotetica Bellardi, 1847
- Raphitoma kharybdis Pusateri & Giannuzzi-Savelli, 2018
- Raphitoma laviae (Philippi, 1844)
- † Raphitoma lennieri Cossmann & Pissaro, 1900
- † Raphitoma leptocolpa Cossmann, 1889
- † Raphitoma lilliputiana Lozouet, 2017
- Raphitoma lineolata (Bucquoy, Dollfus & Dautzenberg, 1883)
- Raphitoma locardi Pusateri, Giannuzzi-Savelli & Oliverio, 2013
- Raphitoma maculosa Høisæter, 2016 (taxon inquirendum)
- † Raphitoma margaritata Janssen, 1978
- † Raphitoma mediodenticulata Lozouet, 2017
- Raphitoma melitis Kontadakis & Mbazios, 2019
- † Raphitoma merignacensis (Peyrot, 1931)
- † Raphitoma michaudi (Bellardi, 1877)
- Raphitoma mirabilis (Pallary, 1904)
- Raphitoma natalensis Barnard, 1958
- † Raphitoma neerrepenensis Marquet, Lenaerts & Laporte, 2016
- † Raphitoma neoscapulata Lozouet, 2017
- Raphitoma nivea (Monterosato, 1875)
- Raphitoma oblonga (Jeffreys, 1867)
- † Raphitoma palumbina Ceulemans, Van Dingenen & Landau, 2018
- Raphitoma papillosa (Pallary, 1904)
- † Raphitoma parahystrix (Boettger, 1902)
- Raphitoma perinsignis (E. A. Smith, 1884)
- † Raphitoma perplexa (Deshayes, 1865)
- † Raphitoma perpulchra (Wood, 1848)
- Raphitoma petanii Prkić, Giannuzzi-Savelli & Pusateri, 2020
- Raphitoma philberti (Michaud, 1829)
- † Raphitoma pleurotomelloides Lozouet, 2017
- Raphitoma pruinosa (Pallary, 1906)
- † Raphitoma pseudocordieri Peyrot, 1931
- Raphitoma pseudohystrix (Sykes, 1906)
- † Raphitoma pulchra (Peyrot, 1931)
- Raphitoma pumila (Monterosato, 1890)
- Raphitoma pupoides (Monterosato, 1884)
- Raphitoma purpurea (Montagu, 1803)
- Raphitoma pusaterii Prkić & Giannuzzi-Savelli, 2020
- † Raphitoma pycnum Lozouet, 1999
- Raphitoma radula (Monterosato, 1884)
- † Raphitoma raynevali (Bellardi, 1877)
- † Raphitoma ringens Bellardi, 1847
- † Raphitoma sapicurtensis Cossmann, 1902
- † Raphitoma scacchii Bellardi, 1847
- † Raphitoma scapulata Lozouet, 2017
- † Raphitoma semicostata Bellardi, 1847
- Raphitoma skylla Pusateri & Giannuzzi-Savelli, 2018
- Raphitoma smriglioi Pusateri & Giannuzzi-Savelli, 2013
- † Raphitoma soniusae Landau, Van Dingenen & Ceulemans, 2020
- Raphitoma sophiae Kontadakis & Polyzoulis, 2019
- Raphitoma spadiana Pusateri & Giannuzzi-Savelli, 2012
- † Raphitoma sparsa Boettger, 1902
- Raphitoma stanici Prkić, Giannuzzi-Savelli & Pusateri, 2020
- † Raphitoma striolaris (Deshayes, 1837)
- Raphitoma strucki (Maltzan, 1883)
- † Raphitoma subaequalis (Boettger, 1902)
- † Raphitoma suberinacea Lozouet, 2017
- † Raphitoma subfragilis Lozouet, 2017
- † Raphitoma subpurpurea (Boettger, 1902)
- † Raphitoma subvellicata Boettger, 1902
- † Raphitoma symmetrica (Reeve, 1846)
- Raphitoma syrtensis F. Nordsieck, 1977
- Raphitoma tomentosa Nordsieck, 1968 (taxon inquirendum)
- † Raphitoma unica (Boettger, 1902)
- † Raphitoma venusta (Lea, 1833)
- † Raphitoma vercingetorixi Ceulemans, Van Dingenen & Landau, 2018
- † Raphitoma vitiosa Lozouet, 1999
- † Raphitoma vogeli Landau, Van Dingenen & Ceulemans, 2020
- Raphitoma volutella (Kiener, 1840)
- Raphitoma zelotypa Rolan et al., 1998

† = species is extinct

== Synonyms ==
- Raphitoma aequalis (Jeffreys, 1867): synonym of Cyrillia aequalis (Jeffreys, 1867)
- Raphitoma affine Locard, 1891: synonym of Bela nebula (Montagu, 1803)
- Raphitoma amoena Sars G.O., 1878: synonym of Nepotilla amoena (G.O. Sars, 1878)
- Raphitoma angusta Bellardi, 1847 †: synonym of Agathotoma angusta (Bellardi, 1847) † (original combination)
- Raphitoma antonjanssei Marquet & Landau, 2006 †: synonym of Raphitoma antonjanseni Marquet, 1998 † (unjustified emendation)
- Raphitoma asperrima (T. Brown, 1827): synonym of Trophonopsis muricata (Montagu, 1803)
- Raphitoma barbierii Brusina, 1866: synonym of Drilliola loprestiana (Calcara, 1841) )
- Raphitoma bedoyai Rolán, Otero-Schmitt & F. Fernandes, 1998: synonym of Daphnella bedoyai (Rolán, Otero-Schmitt & F. Fernandes, 1998) (original combination)
- † Raphitoma bertrandiana (Millet, 1865): synonym of † Daphnella bertrandiana (Millet, 1865)
- Raphitoma bofilliana (Sulliotti, 1889): synonym of Raphitoma alleryana (Sulliotti, 1889)
- Raphitoma boothii Smith, 1839: synonym of Raphitoma concinna (Scacchi, 1836)
- Raphitoma brachystoma (Philippi, 1844): synonym of Sorgenfreispira brachystoma (Philippi, 1844)
- Raphitoma brevis Réquien, 1848: synonym of Raphitoma pupoides (Monterosato, 1884)
- Raphitoma brevis F. Nordsieck, 1977: synonym of Raphitoma brunneofasciata Pusateri, Giannuzzi-Savelli & Oliverio, 2013 (preoccupied name)
- Raphitoma buchanensis Macgillivray, 1843: synonym of Cyrillia linearis (Montagu, 1803)
- Raphitoma cappellinii Deshayes, 1865: synonym of Raphitoma costellata capellinii Deshayes, 1865
- Raphitoma caudicula Nardo, 1848: synonym of Raphitoma leufroyi (Michaud, 1828)
- Raphitoma concinna (Scacchi, 1836): synonym of Leufroyia concinna (Scacchi, 1836)
- Raphitoma confusa Locard, 1897: synonym of Sorgenfreispira brachystoma (Philippi, 1844)
- Raphitoma confusum Locard, 1897: synonym of Sorgenfreispira brachystoma (Philippi, 1844) (dubious synonym; incorrect gender ending)
- Raphitoma corbiformis Locard & Caziot, 1900: synonym of Raphitoma corbis (Potiez & Michaud, 1838)
- Raphitoma cordieri Bucquoy, Dautzenberg & Dollfus, 1883: synonym of Raphitoma horrida (Monterosato, 1884)
- Raphitoma corimbensis Rolán, Otero-Schmitt & F. Fernandes, 1998: synonym of Daphnella corimbensis (Rolán, Otero-Schmitt & F. Fernandes, 1998) (original combination)
- Raphitoma cranchiana Gray, 1852: synonym of Cyrillia linearis (Montagu, 1803)
- Raphitoma cylindracea [sic]: synonym of Raphitoma locardi Pusateri, Giannuzzi-Savelli & Oliverio, 2013 (misspelling of Clathurella cylindrica Locard & Caziot, 1900)
- Raphitoma cyrilli Brusina, 1866: synonym of Cyrillia linearis (Montagu, 1803)
- Raphitoma decorata Locard, 1892: synonym of Raphitoma cordieri (Payraudeau, 1826)
- Raphitoma decussatum Locard, 1891: synonym of Bela decussata (Locard, 1891) (original combination)
- † Raphitoma defrancei Tucker & Renard, 1993: synonym of † Amblyacrum dameriacense (Deshayes, 1865)
- Raphitoma detexta Bellardi, 1877 †: synonym of Bela detexta (Bellardi, 1877) † (original combination)
- Raphitoma divae Carrozza, 1984: synonym of Raphitoma pseudohystrix (Sykes, 1906)
- Raphitoma dollfusi Locard, 1886: synonym of Raphitoma cordieri (Payraudeau, 1826)
- Raphitoma echinata Calcara, 1839: synonym of Raphitoma horrida (Monterosato, 1884)
- Raphitoma elegans Blainville, 1829: synonym of Raphitoma purpurea (Montagu, 1803)
- Raphitoma elegans (Donovan, 1804): synonym of Cyrillia linearis (Montagu, 1803)
- Raphitoma elegans Locard & Caziot, 1900: synonym of Cyrillia linearis (Montagu, 1803)
- Raphitoma elegans Monterosato, 1875: synonym of Cyrillia linearis (Montagu, 1803)
- Raphitoma ephesina Pusateri, Giannuzzi Savelli & Stahlschmidt, 2017: synonym of Cyrillia ephesina (Pusateri, Giannuzzi-Savelli & Stahlschmidt, 2017) (original combination)
- Raphitoma erronea (Monterosato, 1884): synonym of Leufroyia erronea Monterosato, 1884
- Raphitoma euzonata Hervier, 1897: synonym of Kermia episema (Melvill & Standen, 1896)
- Raphitoma exstriolata Cerulli-Irelli, 1910: synonym of Mangelia costulata Risso, 1826
- Raphitoma fallax Forbes, 1844: synonym of Raphitoma purpurea (Montagu, 1803)
- Raphitoma flavida F. Nordsieck, 1977: synonym of Raphitoma densa (Monterosato, 1884)
- Raphitoma fulgurans (Krauss, 1848): synonym of Anachis kraussii (Sowerby I, 1844)
- † Raphitoma georgesi Ceulemans, Van Dingenen & Landau, 2018: synonym of † Cyrillia georgesi (Ceulemans, Van Dingenen & Landau, 2018) † (original combination)
- Raphitoma gougeroti J. K. Tucker & Le Renard, 1993 †: synonym of Amblyacrum gougeroti (J. K. Tucker & Le Renard, 1993) † (original combination)
- Raphitoma hispida Bellardi, 1877 †: synonym of Bela hispida (Bellardi, 1877) † (original combination)
- Raphitoma hispidula Bellardi, 1847 †: synonym of Bela hispidula (Bellardi, 1847) † (original combination)
- Raphitoma hypothetica Bellardi, 1848 †: synonym of Atoma hypothetica (Bellardi, 1848) † (original combination)
- Raphitoma ida Thiele, 1925: synonym of Tritonoturris capensis (Smith, 1882)
- Raphitoma inflata De Cristofori, 1832: synonym of Leufroyia leufroyi (Michaud, 1828)
- Raphitoma intermedia Nordsieck, 1968: synonym of Raphitoma laviae (Philippi, 1844)
- Raphitoma kabuli Rolán, Otero-Schmitt & F. Fernandes, 1998: synonym of Cyrillia kabuli (Rolán, Otero-Schmitt & F. Fernandes, 1998) (original combination)
- † Raphitoma landreauensis Ceulemans, Van Dingenen & Landau, 2018: synonym of † Leufroyia landreauensis (Ceulemans, Van Dingenen & Landau, 2018) (original combination)
- Raphitoma leufroyi (Michaud, 1828): synonym of Leufroyia leufroyi (Michaud, 1828)
- Raphitoma lineare Réquien, 1848: synonym of Raphitoma cordieri (Payraudeau, 1826)
- Raphitoma linearis (Montagu, 1803): synonym of Cyrillia linearis (Montagu, 1803)
- Raphitoma linearis Monterosato, 1875: synonym of Cyrillia linearis (Montagu, 1803)
- Raphitoma lirifera Bellardi, 1877 †: synonym of Bela lirifera (Bellardi, 1877) † (original combination)
- Raphitoma mirabilis Locard, 1891: synonym of Leufroyia leufroyi (Michaud, 1828)
- Raphitoma monterosatoi F. Nordsieck, 1977: synonym of Raphitoma horrida (Monterosato, 1884)
- Raphitoma muricoidea Blainville, 1829: synonym of Cyrillia linearis (Montagu, 1803)
- Raphitoma neapolitana F. Nordsieck, 1977: synonym of Raphitoma pupoides (Monterosato, 1884)
- Raphitoma nebula (Montagu, 1803): synonym of Bela nebula (Montagu, 1803)
- Raphitoma nuperrima (Tiberi, 1855): synonym of Bela nuperrima (Tiberi, 1855)
- Raphitoma obesa Høisæter, 2016: synonym of Cyrillia obesa (Høisæter, 2016) (original combination)
- Raphitoma oceanicum Locard, 1891: synonym of Bela oceanica (Locard, 1891) (original combination)
- Raphitoma ornata Locard, 1891: synonym of Bela ornata (Locard, 1891): synonym of Mangelia costulata Risso, 1826 (original combination)
- Raphitoma ornatus Strebel, 1904: synonym of Tritonoturris capensis (Smith, 1882)
- Raphitoma pallaryi Nordsieck, 1977: synonym of Raphitoma mirabilis (Pallary, 1904)
- Raphitoma payraudeauti Weinkauff, 1868: synonym of Mangelia attenuata (Montagu, 1803)
- Raphitoma peregrinator Locard, 1897: synonym of Mangelia nuperrima (Tiberi, 1855): synonym of Bela nuperrima (Tiberi, 1855)
- † Raphitoma plicata (Lamarck, 1803): synonym of † Elaeocyma plicata (Lamarck, 1804)
- Raphitoma plicatella Bellardi, 1847 †: synonym of Bela plicatella (Bellardi, 1847) † (original combination)
- Raphitoma powisiana Dautzenberg, 1887: synonym of Bela powisiana (Dautzenberg, 1887) (original combination)
- † Raphitoma pseudoconcinna Ceulemans, Van Dingenen & Landau, 2018: synonym of † Daphnella pseudoconcinna (Ceulemans, Van Dingenen & Landau, 2018) (original combination)
- Raphitoma pulchella Adams & Angas, 1863: synonym of Daphnella harrisoni (Tenison-Woods, 1878)
- Raphitoma pumila (Monterosato, 1890): synonym of Raphitoma echinata pumila Monterosato, 1890
- Raphitoma punctatus Brown, 1827: synonym of Raphitoma purpurea (Montagu, 1803)
- Raphitoma pungens Monterosato, 1884: synonym of Raphitoma horrida (Monterosato, 1884)
- Raphitoma radula Monterosato, 1884: synonym of Raphitoma cordieri (Payraudeau, 1826)
- Raphitoma reconditum Locard, 1891: synonym of Bela nuperrima (Tiberi, 1855)
- Raphitoma reticulata Brocchi, 1814: synonym of Raphitoma echinata (Brocchi, 1814)
- Raphitoma reticulata Renier, 1804: synonym of Raphitoma echinata (Brocchi, 1814)
- Raphitoma rissoi Locard, 1886: synonym of Mangelia costulata Risso, 1826
- Raphitoma rosea Brusina, 1866: synonym of Cyrillia linearis (Montagu, 1803)
- Raphitoma sandrii Brusina, 1865: synonym of Mangiliella sandrii (Brusina, 1865): synonym of Mangelia sandrii (Brusina, 1865) (original combination)
- † Raphitoma scacchii Hörn., 1848: synonym of Raphitoma philberti (Michaud, 1829)
- Raphitoma scacchii De Casa & Hallgass, 1979: synonym of Leufroyia concinna (Scacchi, 1836)
- Raphitoma septentrionalis Locard, 1892: synonym of Raphitoma echinata (Brocchi, 1814)
- Raphitoma septenvillei Dautzenberg & Durouchoux, 1913: synonym of Bela septenvillei (Dautzenberg & Durouchoux, 1913): synonym of Bela nebula (Montagu, 1803) (original combination)
- Raphitoma servaini (Locard, 1891): synonym of Raphitoma oblonga (Jeffreys, 1867)
- Raphitoma strictum Locard, 1891: synonym of Mangelia smithii (Forbes, 1840): synonym of Mangelia costulata Risso, 1826
- Raphitoma substriolata Harmer, 1918: synonym of Mangelia costulata Risso, 1826 (dubious synonym)
- Raphitoma syracusanum Blainville, 1829: synonym of Raphitoma cordieri (Payraudeau, 1826)
- † Raphitoma textilis (Brocchi, 1814): synonym of † Rimosodaphnella textilis (Brocchi, 1814)
- Raphitoma tricolor Risso, 1826: synonym of Cyrillia linearis (Montagu, 1803
- † Raphitoma turtaudierei Ceulemans, Van Dingenen & Landau, 2018: synonym of † Leufroyia turtaudierei (Ceulemans, Van Dingenen & Landau, 2018) (original combination)
- Raphitoma variegatum Philippi, 1836: synonym of Raphitoma philberti (Michaud, 1829)
- Raphitoma versicolor Scacchi, 1836: synonym of Raphitoma philberti (Michaud, 1829)
- Raphitoma villaria Pusateri & Giannuzzi-Savelli, 2008: synonym of Leufroyia villaria (Pusateri & Giannuzzi-Savelli, 2008) (original combination)
- Raphitoma zamponorum Horro, Rolán & Gori, 2019: synonym of Cyrillia zamponorum (Horro, Gori & Rolán, 2019) (original combination)
- Raphitoma zonalis Delle Chiaje, 1830: synonym of Leufroyia leufroyi (Michaud, 1828)
- Raphitoma zonatum Locard, 1891: synonym of Bela zonata (Locard, 1891) (original combination)
