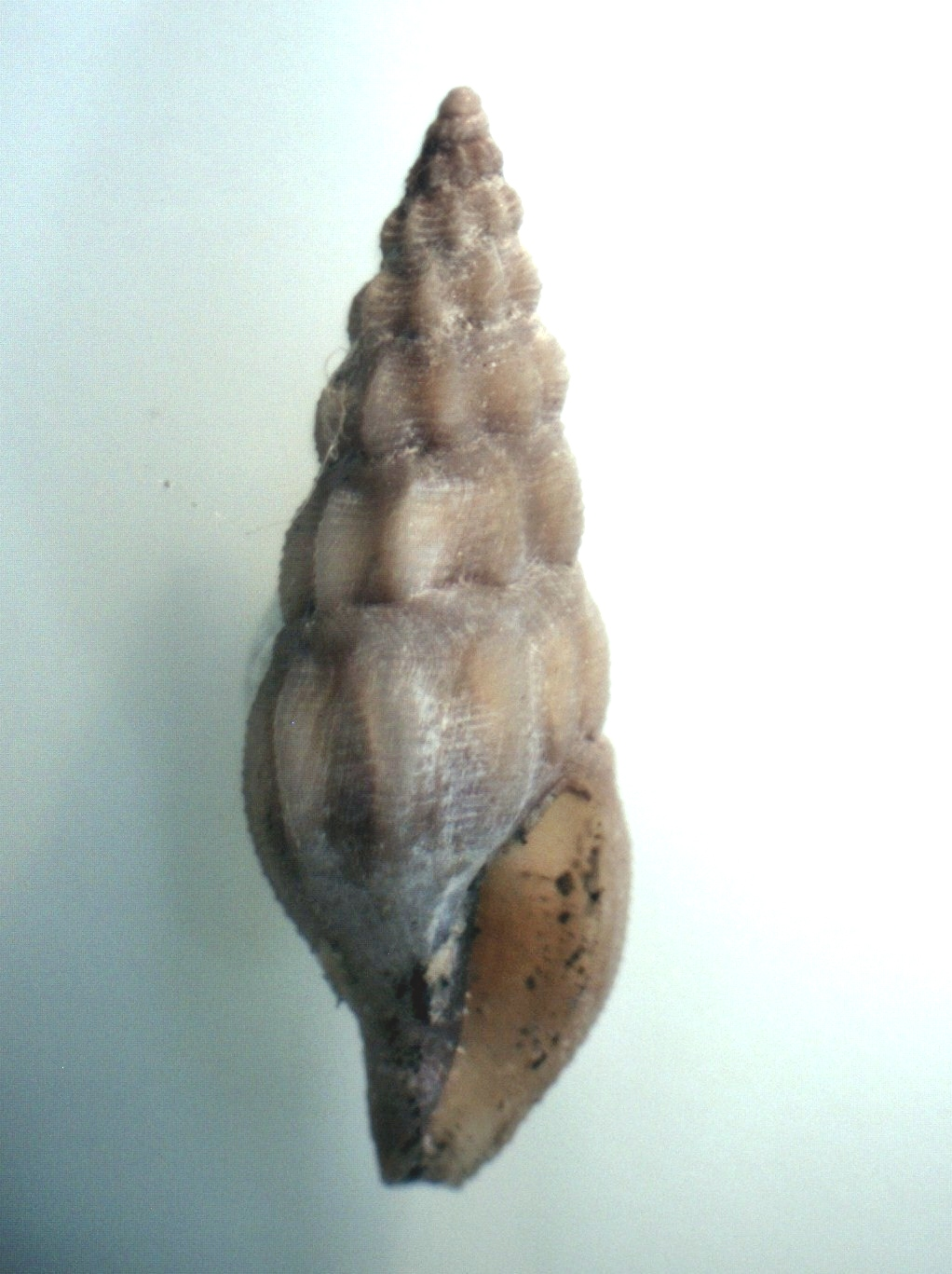
- Shell of Bela nebula, type species of the genus Bela

Scientific classification
- Kingdom: Animalia
- Phylum: Mollusca
- Class: Gastropoda
- Subclass: Caenogastropoda
- Order: Neogastropoda
- Superfamily: Conoidea
- Family: Mangeliidae
- Genus: Bela; Gray, 1847

Type species
- Murex nebula (Montagu, 1803)

Species
- See text

Synonyms
- Bela (Bela) Leach, 1847; Fehria van Aartsen, 1988; Ginnania Monterosato, 1884; Ichnusa Jeffreys, 1847 (name introduced in synonymy, not available); Lora (Bela) Leach, 1847; Mangelia (Bela) J. E. Gray, 1847; † Petrafixia Cossmann, 1901; Pleurotoma (Bela) Leach, 1847

= Bela (gastropod) =

Genus of gastropods

Bela is a genus of sea snails; marine gastropod mollusks in the family Mangeliidae.

== Taxonomy ==
Because of taxonomic uncertainty regarding the type species, many authors in the 19th century e.g. G.O. Sars (1878) and W.H.Dall (1919) used the generic name Bela for unrelated species correctly placed in Propebela, Oenopota or Curtitoma, and then used Raphitoma for species currently placed in Bela.

== Description ==
The ovate shell is fusiform. The surface is dull, smooth, or longitudinally ribbed. The spire is elevated and shorter than the body whorl. The columella is flattened. The siphonal canal is short. The outer lip shows a small sinus at its junction with the body whorl.

== Species ==
Species within the genus Bela (gastropod) include:

- Bela alma Thiele, 1925
- Bela ampla Smith, E.A., 1884 (taxon inquirendum)
- † Bela angulifera (de Boury, 1899)
- † Bela ankae Gürs, 2001
- Bela anna Thiele, 1925
- † Bela antwerpiensis R. Marquet, 1997
- Bela atlantidea (Knudsen, 1952)
- Bela barbiton (Melvill, J.C., 1904)
- Bela beatriceae (Mariottini, 2007)
- † Bela belgica (Van Regteren Altena, 1959)
- Bela bella Barnard, 1958
- † Bela cataractae (Oostingh, 1938)
- Bela chuni Thiele, 1925
- † Bela crassicostata Cossmann, 1889
- † Bela consimilis (Harmer, 1915)
- Bela cycladensis (Reeve, 1845)
- Bela decussata (Locard, 1897)
- † Bela dekoningi Koperberg, 1931
- † Bela detexta (Bellardi, 1877)
- Bela dyscrita (Watson, R.B., 1881)
- † Bela falbalae Ceulemans, Van Dingenen & Landau, 2018
- † Bela fiorentina Della Bella, Naldi & Scarponi, 2015
- Bela fuscata (Deshayes, 1835)
- † Bela gervillei (G.P. Deshayes, 1835)
- † Bela hispida (Bellardi, 1877)
- † Bela hispidula (Bellardi, 1847)
- † Bela idjowensis (Oostingh, 1938)
- † Bela keepingi (Etheridge & Bell, 1898)
- † Bela keukelaari Landau, Van Dingenen & Ceulemans, 2020
- † Bela konstantinoui Kolokotronis, 2023 †
- † Bela lamellicostata Cossmann, 1889
- † Bela lirifera (Bellardi, 1877) (taxon inquirendum)
- Bela manolae Horro, Gori & Rolán, 2017
- † Bela megastoma (Brugnone, 1862)
- Bela menkhorsti van Aartsen, 1988
- Bela minoica Bogi, Giannuzzi Savelli & Pusateri, 2021
- Bela nassoides J. Gardner, 1938
- Bela nebula (Montagu, 1803)
- † Bela nevropleura (Brugnone, 1862)
- Bela nuperrima (Tiberi, 1855)
- Bela obliquigradata E.A. Smith, 1884
- Bela oceanica (Locard, 1897)
- † Bela odhneri Harmer, 1915
- Bela orientalis K.H.J. Thiele, 1925
- Bela patagonica (d'Orbigny, 1841)
- † Bela pediensis Kolokotronis, 2021
- † Bela peyroti Glibert, 1960
- † Bela plagisculpta Della Bella, Naldi & Scarponi, 2015
- † Bela plicatella (Bellardi, 1847)
- Bela plicatilis (Risso, 1826)
- Bela powisiana (Dautzenberg, 1887)
- † Bela proxima (Cocconi, 1873)
- † Bela pseudoappeliusi Naldi, Della Bella & Scarponi, 2013
- † Bela pseudomegastoma Landau, Van Dingenen & Ceulemans, 2020
- † Bela pseudoturgida (Strausz, 1954)
- † Bela pseudovulpecula Landau, Van Dingenen & Ceulemans, 2020
- † Bela quadrata (Peyrot, 1938)
- † Bela redoniana Landau, Van Dingenen & Ceulemans, 2020
- † Bela scarponii Landau, Van Dingenen & Ceulemans, 2020
- † Bela sceauxensis Landau, Van Dingenen & Ceulemans, 2020
- Bela schoenherri Horro, Ryall & Rolán, 2018
- † Bela seyithasanensis B.M. Landau & al., 2013
- Bela submarginata (G. Bonelli in L.M.D. Bellardi, 1847)
- Bela spalatina Prkić & Giannuzzi-Savelli, 2022
- Bela taprurensis (Pallary, 1904)
- † Bela tenuistriata (A. Bell, 1871)
- † Bela trinacria Mariottini & Smriglio, 2009
- Bela turcica K.H.J. Thiele, 1925
- Bela turgida (L.A. Reeve, 1844) (nomen dubium)
- † Bela varovtsiana Scarponi & al., 2016
- † Bela vulpecula (Brocchi, 1814)
- Bela zenetouae (van Aartsen, 1988)
- Bela zonata (Locard, 1892)

Species brought into synonymy

- Bela abyssicola (Reeve, 1844): synonym of Pleurotoma abyssicola Reeve, 1844
- Bela abyssorum Locard, 1897: synonym of Gymnobela abyssorum (Locard, 1897)
- Bela aegeensis (Reeve, 1844): synonym of Bela nebula (Montagu, 1803)
- Bela africana Ardovini, 2004: synonym of Sorgenfreispira africana (Ardovini, 2004)
- Bela africana Ardovini, 2008: synonym of Sorgenfreispira africana (Ardovini, 2004)
- Bela alberti (Dautzenberg & Fisher, 1906): synonym of Phymorhynchus alberti (Dautzenberg & Fischer, 1906)
- Bela albrechti Krause, 1886: synonym of Granotoma albrechti (Krause, 1886)
- Bela aleutica (W.H. Dall, 1871): synonym of Oenopota aleutica (W.H. Dall, 1871)
- Bela americana Packard, 1867: synonym of Propebela scalaris (Møller, 1842)
- Bela anderssoni Strebel, 1908: synonym of Falsimohnia anderssoni (Strebel, 1908)
- Bela angulosa Sars G. O., 1878: synonym of Propebela angulosa (G. O. Sars, 1878)
- † Bela annemariae Lozouet, 2015: synonym of † Petrafixia annemariae (Lozouet, 2015)
- Bela antarctica Strebel, 1908: synonym of Conorbela antarctica (Strebel, 1908)
- Bela apollinea (Melvill, J.C., 1904): synonym of Leiocithara apollinea (Melvill, 1904)
- Bela arctica A. Adams, 1855: synonym of Propebela arctica (A. Adams, 1855)
- Bela ardovinii Mariottini & Oliverio, 2008: synonym of Sorgenfreispira ardovinii (Mariottini & Oliverio, 2008)
- Bela assimilis Sars G. O., 1878: synonym of Propebela assimilis (Sars G. O., 1878)
- Bela australis Adams & Angas, 1864: synonym of Guraleus australis (Adams & Angas, 1864)
- Bela bergensis Friele, 1886: synonym of Propebela bergensis (Friele, 1886)
- Bela bicarinata (Couthouy, 1838): synonym of Curtitoma violacea (Mighels & C. B. Adams, 1842)
- Bela blakei A. E. Verrill, 1885: synonym of Mohnia blakei (A. E. Verrill, 1885)
- Bela blaneyi Bush, 1909: synonym of Oenopota blaneyi (Bush, 1909)
- Bela brachystoma (Philippi, 1844): synonym of Sorgenfreispira brachystoma (Philippi, 1844)
- Bela cancellata Mighels & Adams, 1842 sensu G. O. Sars, 1878: synonym of Bela sarsii Verrill, 1880: synonym of Oenopota impressa (Mörch, 1869)
- Bela cancellata (Mighels & Adams, 1842): synonym of Propebela cancellata (Mighels & Adams, 1842)
- † Bela candida Yokoyama, 1926: synonym of Oenopota candida (Yokoyama, 1926)
- Bela clarae Peñas & Rolán, 2008: synonym of Bela atlantidea (Knudsen, 1952)
- Bela concinnula Verrill, 1882: synonym of Propebela concinnula (A. E. Verrill, 1882)
- Bela confusa (Locard, 1897): synonym of Bela brachystoma (Philippi, 1844)
- Bela conoidea Sars G. O., 1878: synonym of Curtitoma conoidea (Sars G. O., 1878)
- Bela costulata (Risso, 1826): synonym of Mangelia costulata Risso, 1826
- Bela decussata (Couthouy, 1839): synonym of Curtitoma decussata (Couthouy, 1839)
- Bela demersa Tiberi, 1868: synonym of Taranis moerchii (Malm, 1861)
- Bela detegata Locard, 1897: synonym of Propebela bergensis (Friele, 1886)
- Bela erosa (Schrenck, 1861): synonym of Rhodopetoma erosa (Schrenck, 1862)
- Bela erythraea Jousseaume, 1895: synonym of Taranidaphne hongkongensis (Sowerby III, 1889)
- Bela eva Thiele, 1925: synonym of Maoritomella eva (Thiele, 1925)
- Bela exilis Ardovini, 2004: synonym of Sorgenfreispira exilis (Ardovini, 2004)
- Bela expansa Sars G. O., 1878: synonym of Lusitanops expansa (Sars G. O., 1878): synonym of Lusitanops expansus (Sars G. O., 1878)
- Bela exquisita Yokoyama, 1926: synonym of Curtitoma exquisita (Yokoyama, 1926)
- Bela eva Thiele, 1925: synonym of Maoritomella eva (Thiele, 1925)
- Bela excurvata Carpenter, 1864: synonym of Oenopota excurvata (Carpenter, 1864)
- Bela expansa Sars G. O., 1878: synonym of Lusitanops expansa (Sars G. O., 1878)
- Bela fidicula (Gould, 1849): synonym of Propebela fidicula (Gould, 1849)
- Bela filicinctus (E. A. Smith, 1882): synonym of Horaiclavus filicinctus (E. A. Smith, 1882)
- † Bela formica Nordsieck, 1977: synonym of Bela fuscata (Deshayes, 1835) (junior subjective synonym)
- Bela fulvicans Strebel, 1908: synonym of Falsimohnia fulvicans (Strebel, 1908)
- Bela furfuraculata Locard, 1897: synonym of Propebela bergensis (Friele, 1886)
- Bela gazellae Strebel, 1905: synonym of Mangelia gazellae (Strebel, 1905)
- Bela ginnania (Risso, 1826): synonym of Haedropleura septangularis (Montagu, 1803)
- Bela ginnania (Risso, 1826): synonym of Haedropleura septangularis (Montagu, 1803)
- Bela glacialis Thiele, 1912: synonym of Lorabela glacialis (Thiele, 1912)
- Bela gouldii Verrill, 1882: synonym of Propebela rugulata (Reeve, 1846)
- Bela graphica Locard, 1897: synonym of Oenopota graphica (Locard, 1897)
- Bela grimaldii Dautzenberg, 1889: synonym of Amphissa acutecostata (Philippi, 1844)
- Bela grippi Dall, 1908: synonym of Bellaspira grippi (Dall, 1908)
- Bela guernei Dautzenberg, 1891: synonym of Belomitra quadruplex (Watson, 1882)
- Bela harpa Dall, 1885: synonym of Oenopota harpa (Dall, 1885)
- Bela hebes Verrill, 1880: synonym of Curtitoma hebes (Verrill, 1880)
- Bela holomera Locard, 1897: synonym of Gymnobela pyrrhogramma (Dautzenberg & Fischer, 1896)
- Bela iessoensis Smith E. A., 1875: synonym of Obesotoma iessoensis (Smith E. A., 1875)
- Bela incisula Verrill, 1882: synonym of Curtitoma incisula (Verrill, 1882)
- Bela kobelti Verkrüzen, 1876: synonym of Granotoma kobelti (Verkrüzen, 1876)
- † Bela koeneni (Cossmann & Lambert, 1884): synonym of †Petrafixia koeneni (Cossmann & Lambert, 1884)
- Bela koreni Friele, 1886: synonym of Oenopota koreni (Friele, 1886)
- Bela krausei Dall, 1887: synonym of Granotoma krausei (Dall, 1887)
- Bela laevigata (Philippi, 1836): synonym of Bela zonata (Locard, 1892)
- Bela laevigata Dall, 1871: synonym of Obesotoma laevigata (Dall, 1871)
- Bela limatula Locard, 1896: synonym of Amphissa acutecostata (Philippi, 1844)
- Bela luetkeana Krause, 1885: synonym of Propebela luetkeana (Krause, 1885)
- Bela lütkeana Krause, 1885: synonym of Bela luetkeana Krause, 1885: synonym of Propebela luetkeana (Krause, 1885)
- Bela magellanica (Martens, 1881): synonym of Oenopota magellanica (Martens, 1881)
- Bela martensi Strebel, 1905: synonym of Mangelia martensi (Strebel, 1905)
- Bela metschigmensis Krause, 1886: synonym of Oenopota metschigmensis (Krause, 1886)
- Bela michaelseni Strebel, 1905: synonym of Mangelia michaelseni (Strebel, 1905)
- Bela mingoranceae Martin Perez & Vera-Pelaez, 2006: synonym of Bela powisiana (Dautzenberg, 1887)
- Bela minuscularia Locard, 1897: synonym of Curtitoma violacea (Mighels & C. B. Adams, 1842)
- Bela mitralis Adams & Angas, 1864: synonym of Mitraguraleus mitralis (Adams & Angas, 1864)
- Bela mitrula Lovén, 1846: synonym of Propebela exarata (Møller, 1842)
- Bela murdochiana Dall, 1885: synonym of Oenopota murdochiana (Dall, 1885)
- Bela neozelanica Suter, 1908: synonym of Scrinium neozelanica (Suter, 1908)
- † Bela nitida Pavia, 1976: synonym of † Sorgenfreispira nitida (Pavia, 1975) (basionym)
- Bela nobilis (Møller, 1842): synonym of Propebela nobilis (Møller, 1842)
- Bela notophila Strebel, 1908: synonym of Lorabela notophila (Strebel, 1908)
- Bela obliqua Sars G. O., 1878: synonym of Oenopota obliqua (Sars G.O., 1878)
- Bela optima Thiele, 1925: synonym of Microdrillia optima (Thiele, 1925)
- Bela ornata (Locard, 1891): synonym of Mangelia costulata Risso, 1826
- † Bela paessleri H. Strebel, 1905: synonym of Mangelia paessleri (H. Strebel, 1905)
- Bela pelseneri Strebel, 1908: synonym of Lorabela pelseneri (Strebel, 1908)
- Bela plicatula Thiele, 1912: synonym of Lorabela plicatula (Thiele, 1912)
- Bela polysarca (Dautzenberg & Fischer H., 1896): synonym of Gymnobela frielei (Verrill, 1885)
- † Bela pseudoexilis Della Bella, Naldi & Scarponi, 2015: synonym of † Sorgenfreispira pseudoexilis (Della Bella, Naldi & Scarponi, 2015)
- Bela purissima Strebel, 1908: synonym of Typhlodaphne purissima (Strebel, 1908)
- Bela pygmaea Verrill, 1882: synonym of Curtitoma ovalis (Friele, 1877)
- Bela pyramidalis (Ström, 1788): synonym of Oenopota pyramidalis (Strøm, 1788)
- Bela rathbuni Verrill, 1882: synonym of Propebela rathbuni (Verrill, 1882)
- Bela recondita Locard, 1897: synonym of Gymnobela pyrrhogramma (Dautzenberg & Fischer, 1896)
- Bela regina Thiele, 1925: synonym of Tomopleura regina (Thiele, 1925)
- Bela robusta Packard, 1866: synonym of Obesotoma robusta (Packard, 1866)
- Bela rugulata (Reeve, 1846): synonym of Propebela rugulata (Reeve, 1846)
- Bela sansibarica Thiele, 1925: synonym of Microdrillia sansibarica (Thiele, 1925)
- Bela sarsii Verrill, 1880: synonym of Oenopota impressa (Mörch, 1869)
- † Bela scalariformis (Brugnone, 1862): synonym of † Sorgenfreispira scalariformis (Brugnone, 1862)
- Bela scalaris (Møller, 1842): synonym of Propebela scalaris (Møller, 1842)
- Bela scalaroides Sars G. O., 1878: synonym of Propebela scalaroides (Sars G. O., 1878)
- Bela schmidti Friele, 1886: synonym of Oenopota harpa (Dall, 1885)
- Bela sculpturata Dall, 1887: synonym of Mangelia sculpturata (Dall, 1887)
- Bela septangularis (Montagu, 1803): synonym of Haedropleura septangularis (Montagu, 1803)
- Bela septenvillei (Dautzenberg & Durouchoux, 1913): synonym of Bela nebula (Montagu, 1803)
- Bela simplicata É.A.A. Locard, 1896: synonym of Amphissa acutecostata (R. A. Philippi, 1844)
- Bela solida Dall, 1887: synonym of Obesotoma solida (Dall, 1887)
- Bela spitzbergensis Friele, 1886: synonym of Propebela spitzbergensis (Friele, 1886)
- Bela striata Hutton, 1873: synonym of †Iredalula striata (Hutton, 1873)
- Bela striatula Thiele, 1912: synonym of Belalora striatula (Thiele, 1912)
- Bela subarctica Derjugin, 1924: synonym of Propebela rugulata (Reeve, 1846)
- Bela subturgida Verrill, 1884: synonym of Propebela subturgida (Verrill, 1884)
- Bela subvitrea Verrill, 1884: synonym of Propebela subvitrea (Verrill, 1884)
- Bela tenuicostata Sars G. O., 1878: synonym of Oenopota tenuicostata (Sars G.O., 1878)
- Bela tenuilirata Dall, 1871: synonym of Obesotoma tenuilirata (Dall, 1871)
- Bela tenuilirata Krause, 1886: synonym of Curtitoma lawrenciana (Dall, 1919)
- Bela tumida Posselt, 1898: synonym of Obesotoma tumida (Posselt, 1898)
- Bela turricula (Montagu, 1803): synonym of Propebela turricula (Montagu, 1803)
- Bela turriculata Locard, 1892: synonym of Propebela turricula (Montagu, 1803)
- Bela turrita Strebel, 1908: synonym of Belaturricula turrita (Strebel, 1908)
- Bela violacea (Mighels & Adams, 1842): synonym of Curtitoma violacea (Mighels & C. B. Adams, 1842)
- Bela woodiana (Møller, 1842): synonym of Obesotoma woodiana (Møller, 1842)
- Bela yanamii Yokoyama, 1926: synonym of Plicifusus yanamii (Yokoyama, 1926)
- Bela zonatum (Locard, 1891): duplicate of Bela zonata

Nomina dubia

- Bela fortis (Reeve, 1844): nomen dubium
- Bela minuta (Reeve, 1844): nomen dubium
- Bela turgida (Reeve, 1844): nomen dubium
