= Bela turgida =

Scientific classification
- Kingdom: Animalia
- Phylum: Mollusca
- Class: Gastropoda
- Subclass: Caenogastropoda
- Order: Neogastropoda
- Superfamily: Conoidea
- Family: Mangeliidae
- Genus: Bela
- Species: B. turgida

Binomial name
- Bela turgida (Reeve, 1844)

Synonyms
- Pleurotoma turgida Reeve, 1844

Species of gastropod

Bela turgida is a species of sea snail, a marine gastropod mollusk in the family Mangeliidae.

This name of this species is considered a nomen dubium

== Nomenclature ==
Nordsieck (1977: 45) interpreted Pleurotoma turgida Reeve 1844 as a synonym of the preoccupied Pleurotoma nana Scacchi, 1836. However, van Aartsen (1988) considered P. turgida as a nomem dubium, despite the fact that Reeve's name (which was based on the same Aegean material of Forbes (1844) and proposed a replacement name Bela menkhorsti
