= Mangelia mediofasciata =

Scientific classification
- Kingdom: Animalia
- Phylum: Mollusca
- Class: Gastropoda
- Subclass: Caenogastropoda
- Order: Neogastropoda
- Superfamily: Conoidea
- Family: Mangeliidae
- Genus: Mangelia
- Species: M. mediofasciata

Binomial name
- Mangelia mediofasciata (von Maltzan, 1883)

Synonyms
- Mangelia nebula var. mediofasciata (von Maltzan, 1883); Mangilia (Raphitomaj nebula var. mediofasciata von Maltzan, 1883 (original combination); Mangilia mediofasciata (von Maltzan, 1883)

Species of gastropod

Mangelia mediofasciata is a species of sea snail, a marine gastropod mollusk in the family Mangeliidae.

== Description ==
Originally described as a variety of Bela nebula (Montagu, 1803), it is distinct by its shorter height and its more pronounced and more limited sinus. Its outer lip is more inflected. There is a white band on the periphery of the body whorl.

== Distribution ==
This marine species occurs in the Atlantic Ocean off Senegal.
