= Mangelia neapolitana =

Scientific classification
- Kingdom: Animalia
- Phylum: Mollusca
- Class: Gastropoda
- Subclass: Caenogastropoda
- Order: Neogastropoda
- Superfamily: Conoidea
- Family: Mangeliidae
- Genus: Mangelia
- Species: M. neapolitana

Binomial name
- Mangelia neapolitana S. Delle Chiaje, 1841

Species of gastropod

Mangelia neapolitana is a species of sea snail, a marine gastropod mollusc in the family Mangeliidae, the cone snails and their allies.

It is considered a synonym of Mangelia costulata Risso, 1826, but recognized as an accepted species by Tucker.

== Distribution ==
This species occurs in the Mediterranean Sea off Sicily.
