= Mangelia biondi =

Scientific classification
- Kingdom: Animalia
- Phylum: Mollusca
- Class: Gastropoda
- Subclass: Caenogastropoda
- Order: Neogastropoda
- Superfamily: Conoidea
- Family: Mangeliidae
- Genus: Mangelia
- Species: M. biondi

Binomial name
- Mangelia biondi (L.M.D. Bellardi, 1877 )

Extinct species of gastropod

Mangelia biondi is an extinct species of sea snail, a marine gastropod mollusk in the family Mangeliidae.

== Description ==
The length of the shell attains 5 mm.

== Distribution ==
This extinct marine species was found in Pliocene strata of Lombardy, Italy.
