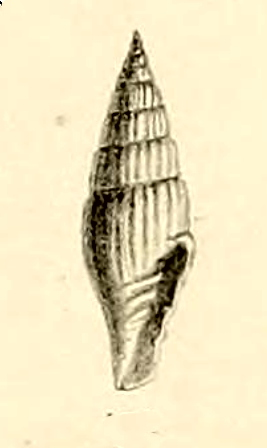
- Shell of † Vexillum recticosta

Scientific classification
- Kingdom: Animalia
- Phylum: Mollusca
- Class: Gastropoda
- Subclass: Caenogastropoda
- Order: Neogastropoda
- Superfamily: Turbinelloidea
- Family: Costellariidae
- Genus: Vexillum
- Species: †V. recticosta

Binomial name
- †Vexillum recticosta (Bellardi, 1850)

Synonyms
- † Mitra (Costellaria) recticosta Bellardi, 1850 superseded combination; † Mitra recticosta Bellardi, 1850 superseded combination; † Turricula recticosta (Bellardi, 1850) superseded combination

= Vexillum recticosta =

Species of gastropod

Vexillum recticosta is an extinct species of sea snail, a marine gastropod mollusk, in the family Costellariidae, the ribbed miters.

== Distribution ==
Fossils of this marine species were found in Middle Miocene strata in Piedmont, Italia.
