= Bela hispidula =

Scientific classification
- Kingdom: Animalia
- Phylum: Mollusca
- Class: Gastropoda
- Subclass: Caenogastropoda
- Order: Neogastropoda
- Superfamily: Conoidea
- Family: Mangeliidae
- Genus: Bela
- Species: B. hispidula

Binomial name
- Bela hispidula (Bellardi, 1847)

Synonyms
- † Clavatula concinnata S. V. Wood, 1848; † Pleurotoma concinnata J. Morris, 1854; † Raphitoma hispidula Bellardi, 1877 (original combination)

Extinct species of gastropod

Bela hispidula is an extinct species of sea snail, a marine gastropod mollusk in the family Mangeliidae.

== Distribution ==
This extinct marine species was found in Pleistocene strata in Italy.
