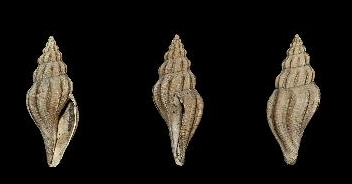
- Shell of Bela plicatella (specimen at MNHN, Paris)

Scientific classification
- Kingdom: Animalia
- Phylum: Mollusca
- Class: Gastropoda
- Subclass: Caenogastropoda
- Order: Neogastropoda
- Superfamily: Conoidea
- Family: Mangeliidae
- Genus: Bela
- Species: B. plicatella

Binomial name
- Bela plicatella (Bellardi, 1847)

Synonyms
- † Daphnella (Raphitoma) plicatella (Bellardi, 1847); † Raphitoma plicatella Bellardi, 1847 (original combination)

= Bela plicatella =

Extinct species of gastropod

Bela plicatella is an extinct species of sea snail, a marine gastropod mollusk in the family Mangeliidae.

== Distribution ==
This extinct marine species was found in Pleistocene strata in Italy and in Pliocene strata in the Alpes-Maritimes, France.
