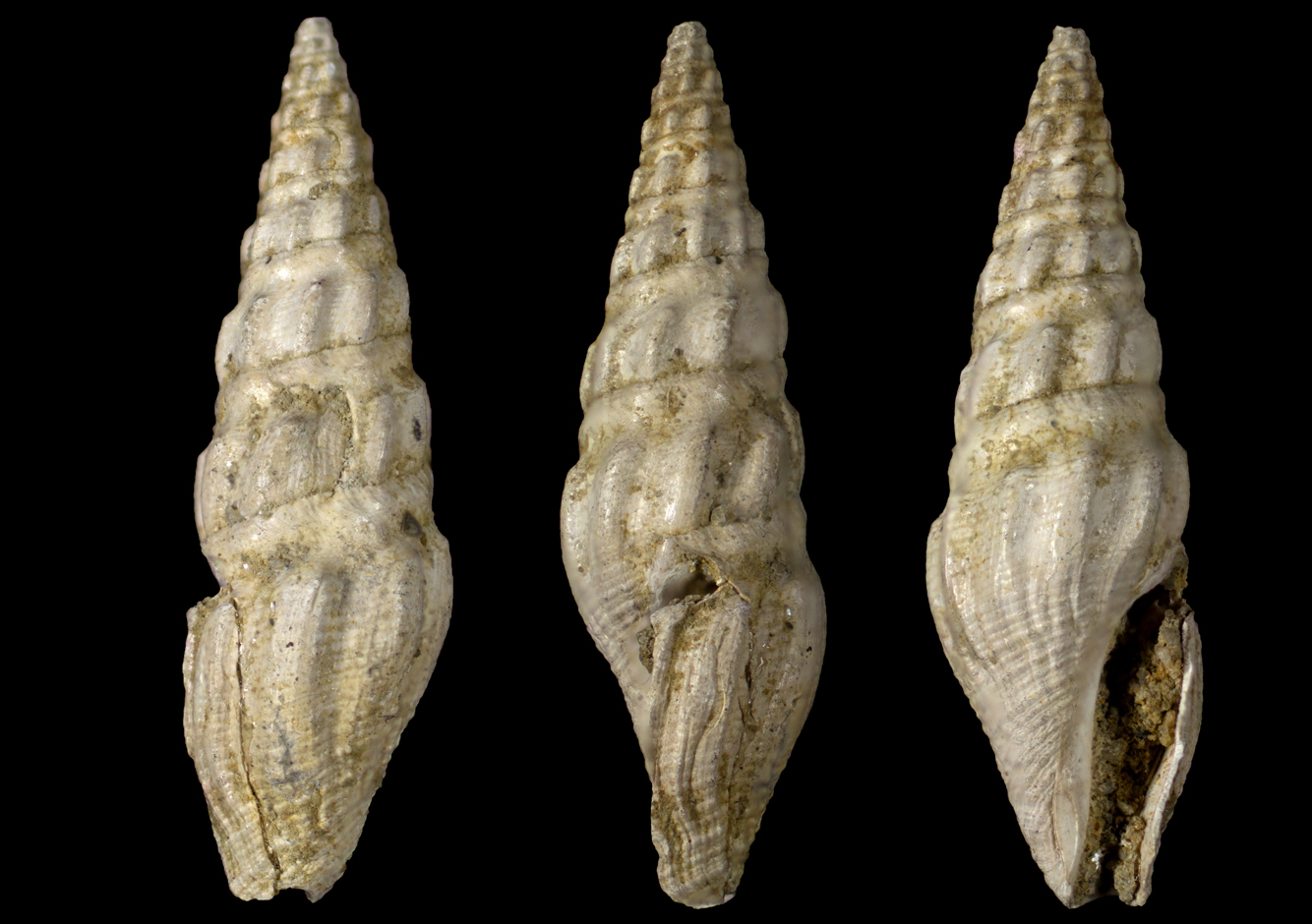
- Shells of Crassispira brocchii (specimens at MNHN, Paris)

Scientific classification
- Kingdom: Animalia
- Phylum: Mollusca
- Class: Gastropoda
- Subclass: Caenogastropoda
- Order: Neogastropoda
- Superfamily: Conoidea
- Family: Pseudomelatomidae
- Genus: Crassispira
- Species: C. brocchii

Binomial name
- Crassispira brocchii (Bellardi & Michelotti, 1841)

Synonyms
- † Drillia (Crassispira) brocchii Bellardi & Michelotti, 1841; † Drillia brocchii (Bellardi & Michelotti, 1840) superseded combination; † Pleurotoma brocchii Bellardi & Michelotti, 1840 superseded combination

= Crassispira brocchii =

Extinct species of gastropod

Crassispira brocchii is an extinct species of sea snail, a marine gastropod mollusk in the family Pseudomelatomidae, the turrids and allies.

== Description ==
The length of the shell attains 40 mm.

== Distribution ==
Fossils have been found in Pliocene strata of Andalusia, Spain and Southern France.
