= Bela lirifera =

Scientific classification
- Kingdom: Animalia
- Phylum: Mollusca
- Class: Gastropoda
- Subclass: Caenogastropoda
- Order: Neogastropoda
- Superfamily: Conoidea
- Family: Mangeliidae
- Genus: Bela
- Species: B. lirifera

Binomial name
- Bela lirifera (Bellardi, 1877)

Synonyms
- † Raphitoma lirifera Bellardi, 1877 (original combination)

Species of gastropod

Bela lirifera is a species of sea snail, a marine gastropod mollusk in the family Mangeliidae.

This species is considered a taxon inquirendum

== Distribution ==
Fossil specimens were found in Pleistocene strata in Italy. Recent specimens were found in the Adriatic Sea and in the Aegean Sea.
