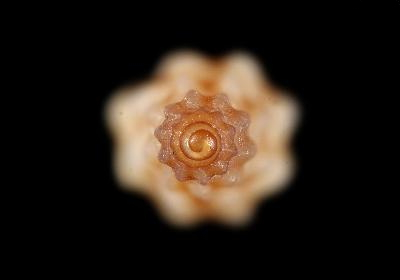
- Protoconch of a shell of Bela plicatilis

Scientific classification
- Kingdom: Animalia
- Phylum: Mollusca
- Class: Gastropoda
- Subclass: Caenogastropoda
- Order: Neogastropoda
- Superfamily: Conoidea
- Family: Mangeliidae
- Genus: Bela
- Species: B. plicatilis

Binomial name
- Bela plicatilis (Risso, 1826)

Synonyms
- Mangelia plicatilis Risso, 1826 (original combination)

= Bela plicatilis =

Species of gastropod

Bela plicatilis is a species of sea snail, a marine gastropod mollusk in the family Mangeliidae.

According to J.K. Tucker (2004), Mangelia plicatilis is a synonym of Haedropleura septangularis (Montagu, G., 1803). However, Mangelia plicatilis is currently considered valid as Bela plicatilis.

== Distribution ==
This species occurs in the Mediterranean Sea.
