= Bela seyithasanensis =

Scientific classification
- Kingdom: Animalia
- Phylum: Mollusca
- Class: Gastropoda
- Subclass: Caenogastropoda
- Order: Neogastropoda
- Superfamily: Conoidea
- Family: Mangeliidae
- Genus: Bela
- Species: B. seyithasanensis

Binomial name
- Bela seyithasanensis (Brugnone, 1862)

Extinct species of gastropod

Bela seyithasanensis is an extinct species of sea snail, a marine gastropod mollusk in the family Mangeliidae.

== Distribution ==
This extinct marine species was found in Miocene strata in Turkey.
