= Bela submarginata =

Scientific classification
- Kingdom: Animalia
- Phylum: Mollusca
- Class: Gastropoda
- Subclass: Caenogastropoda
- Order: Neogastropoda
- Superfamily: Conoidea
- Family: Mangeliidae
- Genus: Bela
- Species: B. submarginata

Binomial name
- Bela submarginata (G. Bonelli in L.M.D. Bellardi, 1847)

Synonyms
- Bela submarginata eichwaldi (Friedberg, 1982); Cythara (Mangelia) submarginata (Bonelli, 1847); Mangelia submarginata (Bonelli, 1847); Pleurotoma submarginata (Bellardi, 1847); Raphitoma submarginata Bonelli, 1847 (original combination)

Species of gastropod

Bela submarginata is a species of sea snail, a marine gastropod mollusk in the family Mangeliidae.

== Description ==
The length of the shell attains 8 mm, its diameter is 3.5 mm.

== Distribution ==
Fossils of this marine species have been found in the Vienna Basin (Hörnes, 1856) and in Ukraine (Friedberg, 1912).
