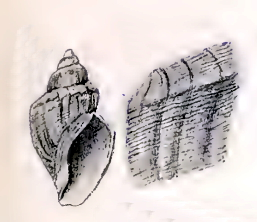
- Conorbela antarctica

Scientific classification
- Kingdom: Animalia
- Phylum: Mollusca
- Class: Gastropoda
- Subclass: Caenogastropoda
- Order: Neogastropoda
- Superfamily: Conoidea
- Family: Pseudomelatomidae
- Genus: Conorbela; Powell, 1951

Type species
- Bela antarctica Strebel, 1908

Species
- See text

= Conorbela =

Genus of gastropods

Conorbela is a genus of sea snails, marine gastropod mollusks in the family Pseudomelatomidae.

== Species ==
Species within the genus Conorbela include:

- Conorbela antarctica (Strebel, 1908)
