= Bela obliquigradata =

Scientific classification
- Kingdom: Animalia
- Phylum: Mollusca
- Class: Gastropoda
- Subclass: Caenogastropoda
- Order: Neogastropoda
- Superfamily: Conoidea
- Family: Mangeliidae
- Genus: Bela
- Species: B. obliquigradata

Binomial name
- Bela obliquigradata Smith, E.A., 1884

Species of gastropod

Bela obliquigradata is a species of sea snail, a marine gastropod mollusk in the family Mangeliidae.

== Description ==
The length of the shell attains 10 mm, its diameter 4 mm. The short shell has an ovate-fusiform shape. It has a pale reddish color. It contains six whorls. The two protoconch whorls are large, smooth, and white. In the third and fourth whorls the spiral lirations are about two or three in number, one encircling the angulation and the rest below it. They are rather stronger than the longitudinal ribs (about 20) and give the whorls a cancellated aspect. In the body whorl these lirae are much finer, very numerous, and closely packed. The aperture is small, narrow. The siphonal canal is short and narrow.
