= Bela pseudoappeliusi =

Scientific classification
- Kingdom: Animalia
- Phylum: Mollusca
- Class: Gastropoda
- Subclass: Caenogastropoda
- Order: Neogastropoda
- Superfamily: Conoidea
- Family: Mangeliidae
- Genus: Bela
- Species: B. pseudoappeliusi

Binomial name
- Bela pseudoappeliusi Naldi, Della Bella & Scarponi, 2013

Synonyms
- † Mangelia appeliusi Bellardi, 1877

Extinct species of gastropod

Bela pseudoappeliusi is an extinct species of sea snail, a marine gastropod mollusk in the family Mangeliidae.

== Description ==
The length of the shell attains 4.5 mm.

== Distribution ==
This extinct marine species was found in Plio–Pleistocene strata in Italy.
