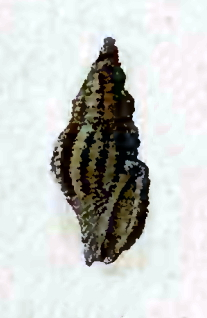
- Drawing of a shell of Bela minuta

Scientific classification
- Kingdom: Animalia
- Phylum: Mollusca
- Class: Gastropoda
- Subclass: Caenogastropoda
- Order: Neogastropoda
- Superfamily: Conoidea
- Family: Mangeliidae
- Genus: Bela
- Species: B. minuta

Binomial name
- Bela minuta (Reeve, 1844)

Synonyms
- Drillia minuta Forbes, 1844; Pleurotoma minuta Reeve, 1844

= Bela minuta =

Species of gastropod

Bela minuta is a species of sea snail, a marine gastropod mollusk in the family Mangeliidae.

The name of this species is considered a nomen dubium

== Description ==
The length of the shell attains 5 mm.

The reddish brown shell is strongly ribbed and distantly spirally striate.

== Distribution ==
This species occurs in the Aegean Sea.
