= Bela ankae =

Scientific classification
- Kingdom: Animalia
- Phylum: Mollusca
- Class: Gastropoda
- Subclass: Caenogastropoda
- Order: Neogastropoda
- Superfamily: Conoidea
- Family: Mangeliidae
- Genus: Bela
- Species: B. ankae

Binomial name
- Bela ankae K. Gürs, 2001

Extinct species of gastropod

Bela ankae is an extinct species of sea snail, a marine gastropod mollusk in the family Mangeliidae.

== Distribution ==
This extinct marine species was found in Miocene strata in Belgium and in Upper Miocene strata in the North Sea basin.
