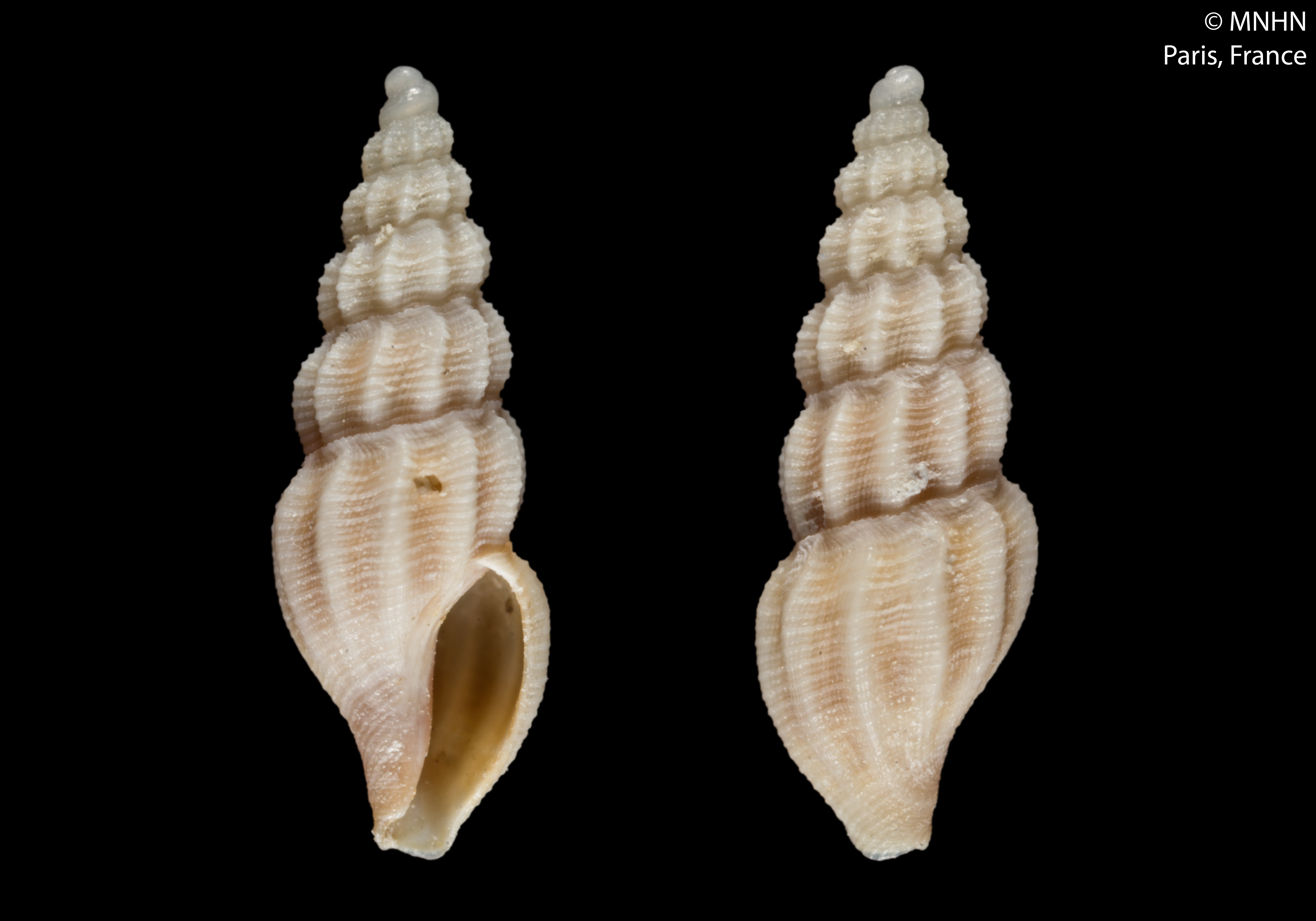
- Shell of Bela taprurensis (lectotype at MNHN, Paris)

Scientific classification
- Kingdom: Animalia
- Phylum: Mollusca
- Class: Gastropoda
- Subclass: Caenogastropoda
- Order: Neogastropoda
- Superfamily: Conoidea
- Family: Mangeliidae
- Genus: Bela
- Species: B. taprurensis

Binomial name
- Bela taprurensis (Pallary, 1904)

Synonyms
- Bela brachystoma apicalis F. Nordsieck, 1977; Bela taprunensis [sic] (misspelling of Bela taprurensis (Pallary, 1904)); Fehria taprurensis (Pallary, 1904); Ginnania taprurensis Pallary, 1904 (original combination)

= Bela taprurensis =

Species of gastropod

Bela taprurensis is a species of sea snail, a marine gastropod mollusk in the family Mangeliidae.

== Description ==
The length of the shell attains 7.5 mm, its diameter 2.5 mm.

(Original description) The buff, fusiform shell is narrowly oblong. It contains 7 whorls of which two in the protoconch. The whorls of the teleoconch are slightly convex and are covered with raised longitudinal ribs. The whole surface is equably covered with fine, faintly raised, rounded, spiral threads. The aperture measures about a third of the total length. It is open, and oblong, pointed above, scarcely contracted below, but truncated at the end of the broad open siphonal canal. The columella is hardly twisted. The outer lip is sharp.

== Distribution ==
This species occurs in the Mediterranean Sea off Greece, Libya and Tunisia

== Bibliography ==
- Gofas, S.; Le Renard, J.; Bouchet, P. (2001). Mollusca, in: Costello, M.J. et al. (Ed.) (2001). European register of marine species: a check-list of the marine species in Europe and a bibliography of guides to their identification. Collection Patrimoines Naturels, 50: pp. 180–213
- Mariottini P., Smriglio C., Di Giulio A. & Oliverio M. 2009. A new fossil conoidean from the Pliocene of Italy, with comments on the Bela menkhorsti complex (Gastropoda: Conidae). Journal of Conchology 40(1): 5-14
- Repetto G., Orlando F. & Arduino G. (2005): Conchiglie del Mediterraneo, Amici del Museo "Federico Eusebio", Alba, Italy
