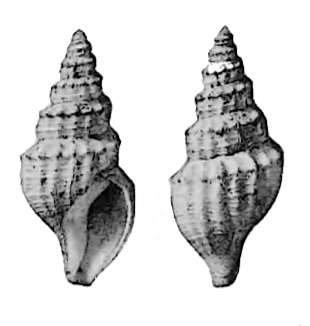
- Original image of a shell of Bela odhneri

Scientific classification
- Kingdom: Animalia
- Phylum: Mollusca
- Class: Gastropoda
- Subclass: Caenogastropoda
- Order: Neogastropoda
- Superfamily: Conoidea
- Family: Mangeliidae
- Genus: Bela
- Species: B. odhneri

Binomial name
- Bela odhneri (Harmer, 1915)

= Bela odhneri =

Extinct species of gastropod

Bela odhneri is an extinct species of sea snail, a marine gastropod mollusk in the family Mangeliidae.

== Description ==
The length of the shell attains 14 mm, its diameter 7 mm.

(Original description) The turreted shell is fairly solid and has a fusiform shape. It contains 7 whorls, nearly flat and strongly carinated. The body whorl is tumid, about as long as the spire, excavated below. The shell is ornamented by about fifteen strong longitudinal ribs which do not reach the siphonal canal and are nearly as wide as the spaces between them. They are intersected by raised and unequal spiral ridges, the upper one forming a continuous margin to the whorls. The suture is deep. The aperture is oval. The outer lip is obtusely angulated by the keel. The inner lip forms a glaze on the columella. The siphonal canal is open and exserted The columella is tortuous and excavated .

== Distribution ==
This extinct marine species was found in the Pliocene strata in Suffolk, Great Britain.
