= Bela keepingi =

Scientific classification
- Kingdom: Animalia
- Phylum: Mollusca
- Class: Gastropoda
- Subclass: Caenogastropoda
- Order: Neogastropoda
- Superfamily: Conoidea
- Family: Mangeliidae
- Genus: Bela
- Species: B. keepingi

Binomial name
- Bela keepingi Etheridge & Bell, 1898

Synonyms
- † Bela neerlandica Beets 1946; † Mangelia keepingi (Etheridge & Bell. 1898); † Mangelia (Mangelia) keepingi forma keepingi(Etheridge & A. Bell, 1898) forma consimilis (Harmer); † Pleurotoma keepingi Etheridge & Bell, 1898 (original combination); † Raphitoma keepingi (Etheridge & Bell, 1898)

Extinct species of gastropod

Bela keepingi is an extinct species of sea snail, a marine gastropod mollusk in the family Mangeliidae.

== Description ==
The shell of Bela keepingi is relatively small, with a length that can reach up to 6.6 mm and a diameter of about 2.2 mm.

== Distribution ==
This extinct marine species was found in the Pliocene and Pleistocene strata in Cornwall, Great Britain, and in Belgium.
