= Bela beatriceae =

Scientific classification
- Kingdom: Animalia
- Phylum: Mollusca
- Class: Gastropoda
- Subclass: Caenogastropoda
- Order: Neogastropoda
- Superfamily: Conoidea
- Family: Mangeliidae
- Genus: Bela
- Species: B. beatriceae

Binomial name
- Bela beatriceae (Mariottini, 2007)

Synonyms
- Brachycythara beatriceae Mariottini, 2007 (original combination)

Species of gastropod

Bela beatriceae (formerly Brachycythara beatriceae) is a species of sea snail, a marine gastropod mollusk in the family Mangeliidae.

== Description ==
The length of the shell attains 7 mm.

It was described in 2007 by Paolo Mariottini based on shell morphology. It is distinguished from the closely related Brachycythara atlantidea by differences in shell shape, sculpture, and protoconch characteristics.

== Distribution ==
This species occurs in the Alboran Sea, part of the Mediterranean Sea and in tropical West Africa waters off the coast off Western Sahara, where it inhabits muddy bottoms.
