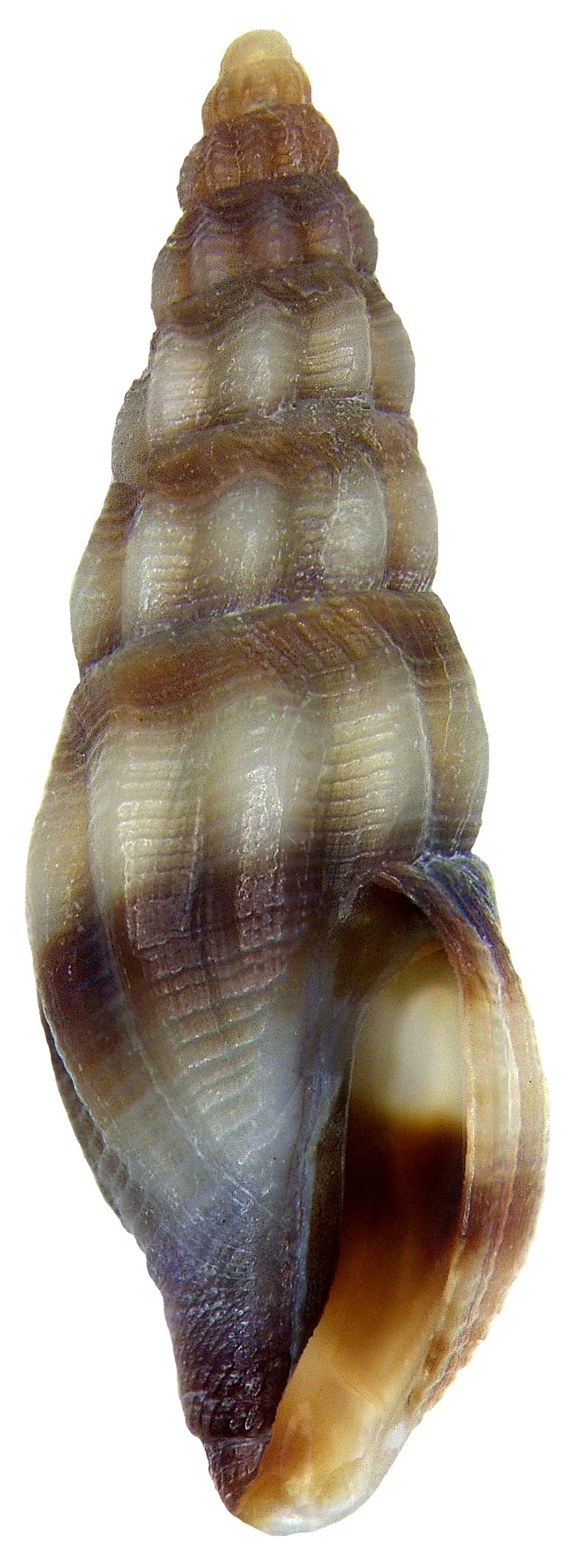
- Shell of Bela zonata

Scientific classification
- Kingdom: Animalia
- Phylum: Mollusca
- Class: Gastropoda
- Subclass: Caenogastropoda
- Order: Neogastropoda
- Superfamily: Conoidea
- Family: Mangeliidae
- Genus: Bela
- Species: B. zonata

Binomial name
- Bela zonata (Locard, 1892)

Synonyms
- Bela laevigata (Philippi, 1836); Drillia nebula var. laevigata (Philippi, 1836); Pleurotoma laevigata Philippi, 1836 (synonym); Pleurotoma laevigatum Philippi, 1836 (basionym; incorrect gender ending); Raphitoma zonatum Locard, 1892 (basionym)

= Bela zonata =

Species of gastropod

Bela zonata is a species of sea snail in the family Mangeliidae.

== Description ==
The length of the shell attains 7 mm. The shell is elongated, with the ribs not so prominent, and sometimes nearly obsolete, the revolving striae faint.

== Distribution ==
This species occurs in the Mediterranean Sea and in the Eastern Atlantic Ocean.
