= Bela belgica =

Scientific classification
- Kingdom: Animalia
- Phylum: Mollusca
- Class: Gastropoda
- Subclass: Caenogastropoda
- Order: Neogastropoda
- Superfamily: Conoidea
- Family: Mangeliidae
- Genus: Bela
- Species: B. belgica

Binomial name
- Bela belgica (Van Regteren Altena, 1959)

Synonyms
- † Mangelia (Bela) belgica Van Regteren Altena, 1959

Extinct species of gastropod

Bela belgica is an extinct species of sea snail, a marine gastropod mollusk in the family Mangeliidae.

== Description ==
The length of the shell attains 15 mm, its diameter 4.6 mm.

== Distribution ==
This extinct marine species was found in the Pliocene strata in Belgium.
