= Bela megastoma =

Scientific classification
- Kingdom: Animalia
- Phylum: Mollusca
- Class: Gastropoda
- Subclass: Caenogastropoda
- Order: Neogastropoda
- Superfamily: Conoidea
- Family: Mangeliidae
- Genus: Bela
- Species: B. megastoma

Binomial name
- Bela megastoma (Brugnone, 1862)

Synonyms
- † Pleurotoma megastomum Brugnone, 1862 (original combination)

Extinct species of gastropod

Bela megastoma is an extinct species of sea snail, a marine gastropod mollusk in the family Mangeliidae.

== Description ==
The length of the shell attains 12 mm.

== Distribution ==
This extinct marine species was found in Pleistocene strata in Italy.
