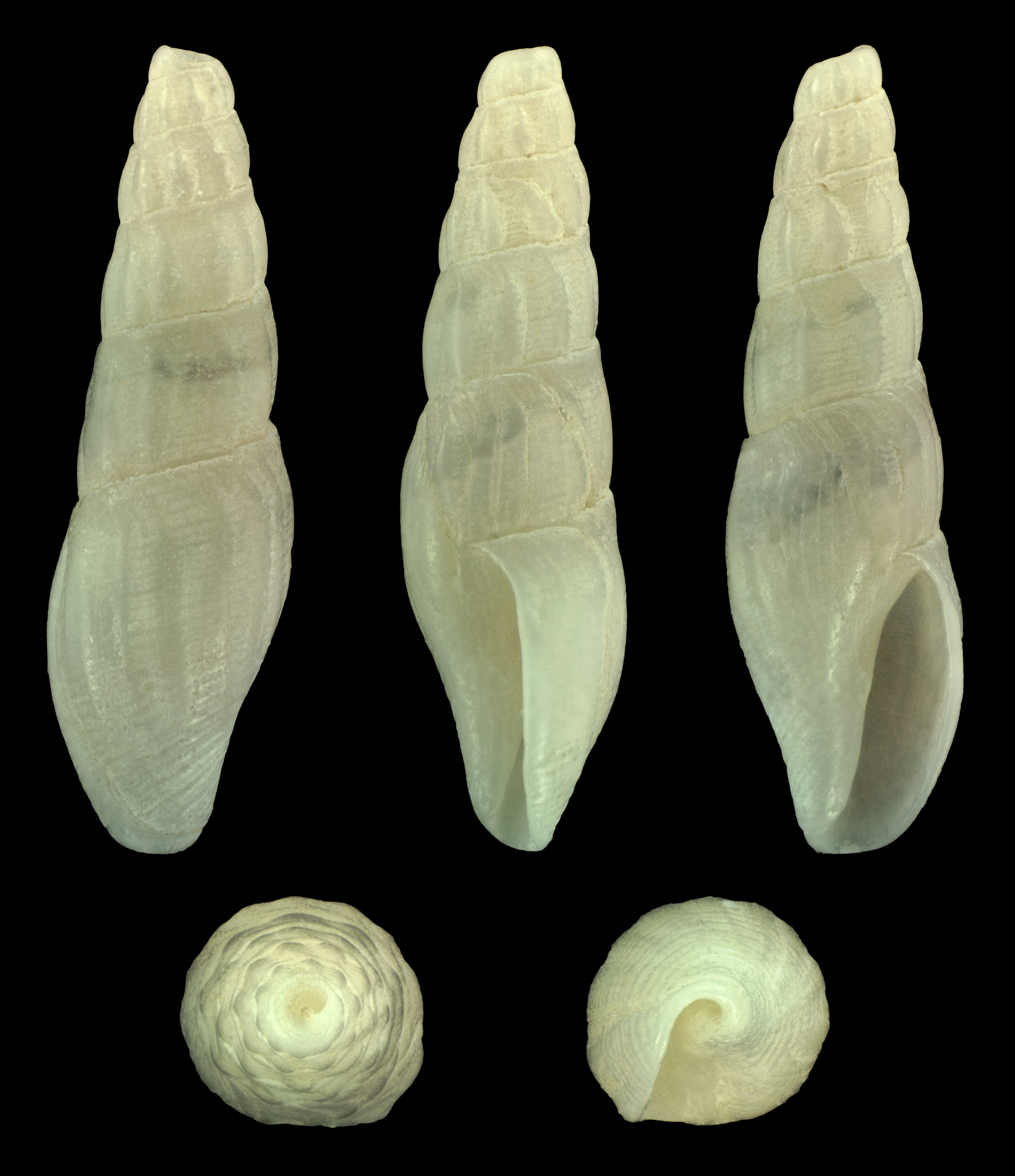

Scientific classification
- Kingdom: Animalia
- Phylum: Mollusca
- Class: Gastropoda
- Subclass: Caenogastropoda
- Order: Neogastropoda
- Superfamily: Conoidea
- Family: Mangeliidae
- Genus: Bela
- Species: B. powisiana

Binomial name
- Bela powisiana (Dautzenberg, 1887)

Synonyms
- Raphitoma powisiana Dautzenberg, 1887 (original combination); Mangelia (Bela) powisiana (Dautzenberg); Mangelia powisiana (Dautzenberg, 1887); Villiersiella powisiana (Dautzenberg, 1887); Bela mingoranceae Martin Perez & Vera-Pelaez, 2006 (junior synonym)

= Bela powisiana =

Species of gastropod

Bela powisiana is a species of sea snail, a marine gastropod mollusk in the family Mangeliidae.

== Description ==
The length of tall, narrow shell attains 15 mm. It contains eight or nine whorls. The shell shows broad, orthocline ribs with a thickened rim at the sutures and crossed by fine, spiral striae. The aperture is narrow. The outer lip is not noticeably angular. The color of the shell varies from deep brown to purple with a broad brown band, interrupted over the ribs.

== Distribution ==
This species occurs in the Alboran Sea; in the Atlantic Ocean from Norway to the Bay of Biscay.
