= Bela trinacria =

Scientific classification
- Kingdom: Animalia
- Phylum: Mollusca
- Class: Gastropoda
- Subclass: Caenogastropoda
- Order: Neogastropoda
- Superfamily: Conoidea
- Family: Mangeliidae
- Genus: Bela
- Species: B. trinacria

Binomial name
- Bela trinacria Mariottini P., Smriglio C., Di Giulio A. & Oliverio M., 2009

Extinct species of gastropod

Bela trinacria is an extinct species of sea snail, a marine gastropod mollusk in the family Mangeliidae.

== Description ==
The height of the shell attains 8.5 mm, its diameter is 3.5 mm. It is characterized by its distinctive shell, which places it within the Genus Bela, known for its fusiform shells with elevated spirals and a short siphonal canal.

== Distribution ==
Fossils of this species have been found in Pliocene strata in Sicily, Italy.
