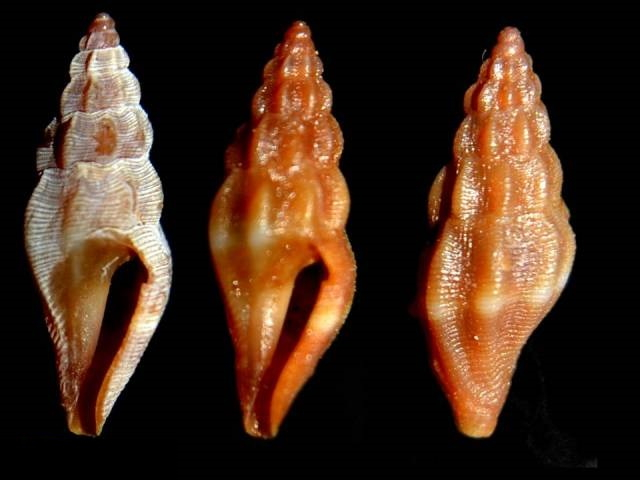
- Shells of Bela zenetouae

Scientific classification
- Kingdom: Animalia
- Phylum: Mollusca
- Class: Gastropoda
- Subclass: Caenogastropoda
- Order: Neogastropoda
- Superfamily: Conoidea
- Family: Mangeliidae
- Genus: Bela
- Species: B. zenetouae

Binomial name
- Bela zenetouae (van Aartsen, 1988)

Synonyms
- Fehria zenetouae van Aartsen, 1988

= Bela zenetouae =

Species of gastropod

Bela zenetouae is a species of sea snail, a marine gastropod mollusk in the family Mangeliidae.

== Distribution ==
This species is found in the Mediterranean Sea off Greece and Italy.
