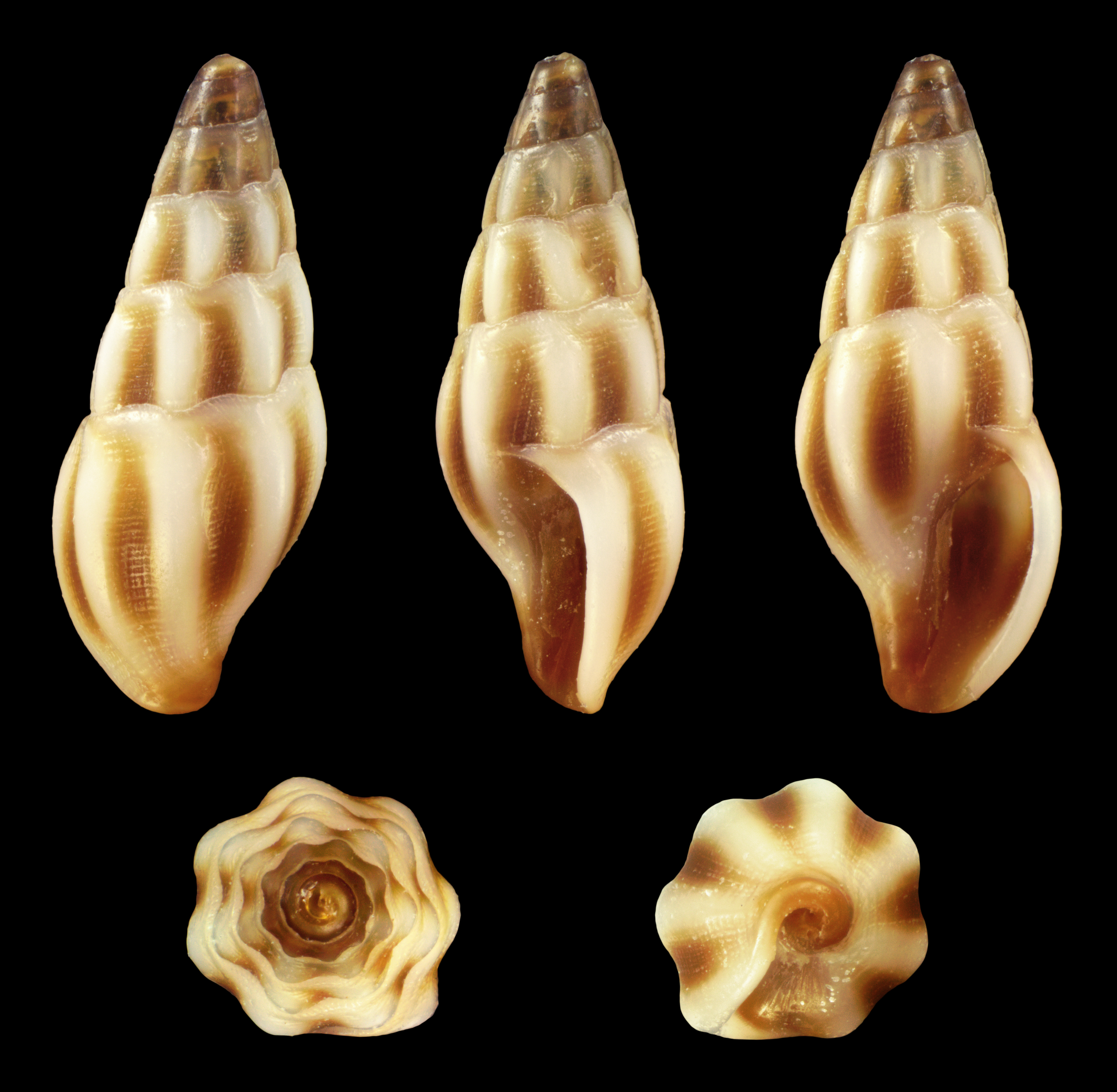
- Shells of Bela oceanica

Scientific classification
- Kingdom: Animalia
- Phylum: Mollusca
- Class: Gastropoda
- Subclass: Caenogastropoda
- Order: Neogastropoda
- Superfamily: Conoidea
- Family: Mangeliidae
- Genus: Bela
- Species: B. oceanica

Binomial name
- Bela oceanica (Locard, 1897)

Synonyms
- Bela nebula oceanica É.A.A. Locard, 1897; Raphitoma oceanicum Locard, 1892 (basionym)

= Bela oceanica =

Species of gastropod

Bela oceanica is a species of sea snail, a marine gastropod mollusk in the family Mangeliidae.

== Taxonomy ==
Species of uncertain validity, in need of revision.

== Description ==
The length of the shell varies between 7 mm and 9 mm.

== Distribution ==
This species is found in European waters, in the English Channel; in the Alboran Sea, Mediterranean Sea; and in the Atlantic Ocean off West Africa, and the Canary Islands.
