= Bela nassoides =

Scientific classification
- Kingdom: Animalia
- Phylum: Mollusca
- Class: Gastropoda
- Subclass: Caenogastropoda
- Order: Neogastropoda
- Superfamily: Conoidea
- Family: Mangeliidae
- Genus: Bela
- Species: B. nassoides

Binomial name
- Bela nassoides J. Gardner, 1937

Species of gastropod

Bela nassoides is a species of sea snail, a marine gastropod mollusk in the family Mangeliidae.

== Description ==
The length of the shell attains 5.5 mm, its diameter 2.6 mm

== Distribution ==
This marine species occurs off Florida, United States.

== Description ==
The shell of Bela nassaoides is small, reaching a length of about 5.5 mm and a diameter of approximately 2.6 mm. The shell is slender, a typical feature of many species in the family Mangeliidae.
