= Bela gervillei =

Scientific classification
- Kingdom: Animalia
- Phylum: Mollusca
- Class: Gastropoda
- Subclass: Caenogastropoda
- Order: Neogastropoda
- Superfamily: Conoidea
- Family: Mangeliidae
- Genus: Bela
- Species: B. gervillei

Binomial name
- Bela gervillei G.P. Deshayes, 1835

Synonyms
- † Bela (Buchozia) gervillei G.P. Deshayes, 1835; † Etallonia gervillei Deshayes, 1884

Extinct species of gastropod

Bela gervillei is an extinct species of sea snail, a marine gastropod mollusk in the family Mangeliidae.

== Description ==
The length of the shell attains 5 mm, its diameter 2 mm.

== Distribution ==
This extinct marine species was found in Eocene strata in Normandy, France.
