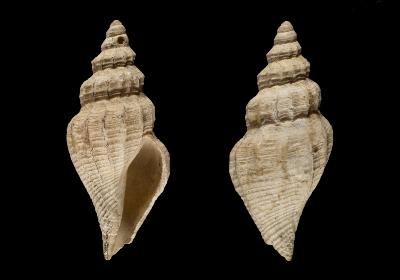
- Shell of Bela nuperrima (syntype at MNHN, Paris)

Scientific classification
- Kingdom: Animalia
- Phylum: Mollusca
- Class: Gastropoda
- Subclass: Caenogastropoda
- Order: Neogastropoda
- Superfamily: Conoidea
- Family: Mangeliidae
- Genus: Bela
- Species: B. nuperrima

Binomial name
- Bela nuperrima (Tiberi, 1855)

Synonyms
- Mangelia nuperrima (Tiberi, 1855); Pleurotoma decussata Philippi, 1844; Pleurotoma nuperrimum Tiberi, 1855 (original combination); Pleurotomella reconditum (Locard, 1891); Raphitoma nuperrima (Tiberi, 1855); Raphitoma nuperrima var. corallinoides Sturany, 1896; Raphitoma nuperrima var. pseudoacanthodes Sturany, 1896; Raphitoma peregrinator Locard, 1897; Raphitoma recondita Locard, E.A.A., 1892

= Bela nuperrima =

Species of gastropod

Bela nuperrima is a species of sea snail, a marine gastropod mollusk in the family Mangeliidae.

== Description ==
The length of the shell varies between 5 mm and 14 mm.

The rather thin shell shows about twelve distant, small longitudinal riblets, crossed by distant raised lines.

== Distribution ==
This marine species occurs in the Mediterranean Sea and in the Atlantic Ocean off Senegal

Fossils of this marine species were found in Pleistocene strata in Italy.
