= Bela varovtsiana =

Scientific classification
- Kingdom: Animalia
- Phylum: Mollusca
- Class: Gastropoda
- Subclass: Caenogastropoda
- Order: Neogastropoda
- Superfamily: Conoidea
- Family: Mangeliidae
- Genus: Bela
- Species: B. varovtsiana

Binomial name
- Bela varovtsiana Scarpioni et al. 2016

Extinct species of gastropod

Bela varovtsiana is an extinct species of sea snail, a marine gastropod mollusk in the family Mangeliidae.

== Distribution ==
Fossils of this species have been found in Miocene strata in Ukraine; age range: 13.65 to 11.608 Ma
