= Mitraguraleus =

Scientific classification
- Kingdom: Animalia
- Phylum: Mollusca
- Class: Gastropoda
- Subclass: Caenogastropoda
- Order: Neogastropoda
- Superfamily: Conoidea
- Family: Mangeliidae
- Genus: Mitraguraleus; Laseron, 1954

Type species
- Bela mitralis Adams & Angas, 1864

Species
- See text

Genus of gastropods

Mitraguraleus is a genus of sea snails, marine gastropod mollusks in the family Mangeliidae.

== Distribution ==
This marine genus is endemic to Australia and occurs off New South Wales, South Australia, Tasmania, Victoria and Western Australia

== Species ==
- Mitraguraleus mitralis (A. Adams & Angas, 1864)

Species brought into synonymy:

- Mitraguraleus australis (A. Adams & G.F. Angas, 1864) synonym of Mitraguraleus mitralis (A. Adams & Angas, 1864)
