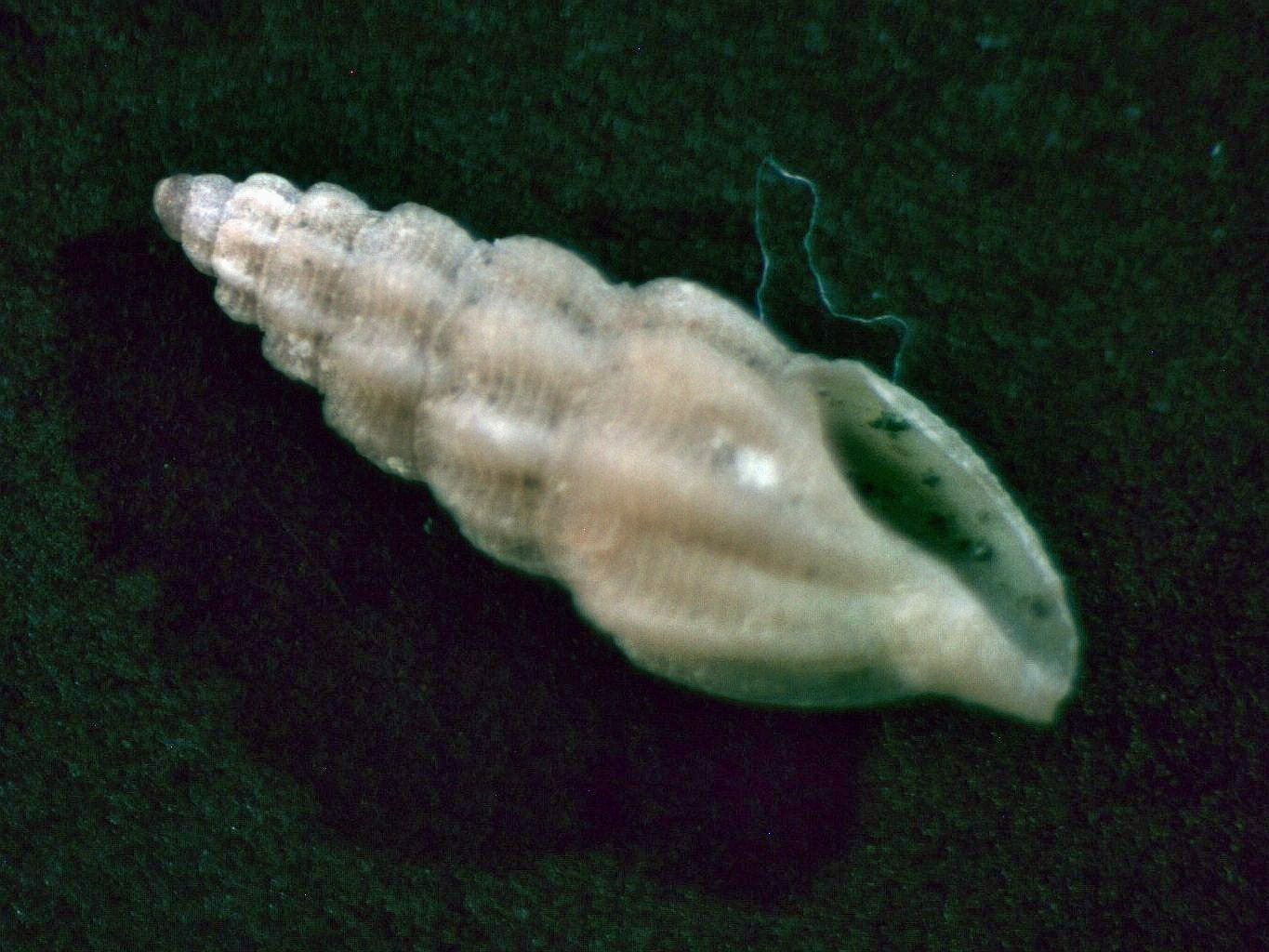
- Sorgenfreispira brachystoma

Scientific classification
- Kingdom: Animalia
- Phylum: Mollusca
- Class: Gastropoda
- Subclass: Caenogastropoda
- Order: Neogastropoda
- Superfamily: Conoidea
- Family: Mangeliidae
- Genus: Sorgenfreispira
- Species: S. brachystoma

Binomial name
- Sorgenfreispira brachystoma (Philippi, 1844)

Synonyms
- Bela brachystoma (Philippi, 1844); Bela brachystoma apicalis Nordsieck, 1977 [taxon inquirendum]; Bela confusa (Locard, 1897); Daphnella brachystoma (Philippi, 1844); Daphnella forbesii Reeve, L.A., 1846; Mangelia (Mangelia) brachystoma (Philippi); Mangilia tiarula Lovén, S.L., 1846; Pleurotoma brachystoma var. curta Almera & Bofill, 1898; Pleurotoma brachystoma var. emporitensis Almera, 1907; Pleurotoma brachystomum Philippi, 1844 (basionym); Pleurotoma granulifera Brugnone, 1862; Pleurotoma submarginata var. minor Almera & Bofill, 1898; Raphitoma brachystoma (Philippi, 1844); Raphitoma brachystoma var. comitasensis Fontannes, 1879; Raphitoma confusa Locard, 1897; Raphitoma confusum Locard, 1897 (dubious synonym; incorrect gender ending); Sorgenfreispira brachystoma (var.) alba Marshall, J.T., 1912; Sorgenfreispira brachystoma (var.) apicalis Nordsieck, F., 1977; Sorgenfreispira brachystoma (var.) obesa Locard, E.A.A. & E. Caziot, 1900

= Sorgenfreispira brachystoma =

Species of gastropod

Sorgenfreispira brachystoma is a species of sea snail, a marine gastropod mollusk in the family Mangeliidae.

The subspecies Sorgenfreispira brachystoma africana Ardovini, 2004 has become a synonym of Sorgenfreispira africana Ardovini, 2004

== Description ==
The shell size varies between 4 mm and 7 mm.

The turreted shell is slightly, narrowly shouldered, with 7-9 narrow ribs extending from the shoulder to the base, and wider interspaces. The whole surface covered with revolving striae. Their interaction with the growth lines produce prominent, scale-like tubercles. The prominent subsutural band is narrow with a beaded ridge below the suture. The aperture is elongate-oval with an anal sinus and a short, wide siphonal canal.

The color of the shell is yellowish white, orange or occasionally deep reddish brown. Paler specimens are sometimes indistinctly brown-banded below the periphery.

== Distribution ==
This species occurs on sand and sandy muddy bottom at depths between 4 m to 60 m in the Northeast Atlantic Ocean off Norway, in the North Sea off the British Isles, in the Atlantic Ocean off Ireland, Spain, Portugal and West Africa, and in the Mediterranean Sea and the Adriatic Sea.

Fossils have been found in various Pliocene-Pleistocene strata in England, France, Spain and Italy.
