= Bela antwerpiensis =

Scientific classification
- Kingdom: Animalia
- Phylum: Mollusca
- Class: Gastropoda
- Subclass: Caenogastropoda
- Order: Neogastropoda
- Superfamily: Conoidea
- Family: Mangeliidae
- Genus: Bela
- Species: B. antwerpiensis

Binomial name
- Bela antwerpiensis R. Marquet, 1997

Synonyms
- † Bela neerlandica Beets 1946; † Mangelia (Mangelia) keepingi (Etheridge & A. Bell, 1898) forma consimilis (Harmer); † Moniliopsis neerlandica Beets, 1946; † Pleurotoma brachystoma, Phil - NYST, p. 53 (non Pleurotoma brachystoma Philippi, 1844)

Extinct species of gastropod

Bela antwerpiensis is an extinct species of sea snail, a marine gastropod mollusk in the family Mangeliidae.

== Description ==
The length of the shell attains 6 mm, its diameter is 2.7 mm.

== Distribution ==
This extinct marine species was found in Pliocene strata in Belgium.
