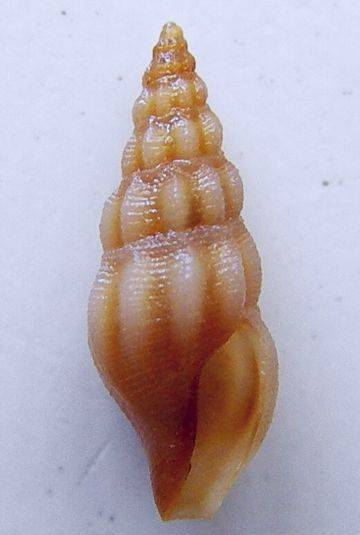
- Shell of Bela minoica

Scientific classification
- Kingdom: Animalia
- Phylum: Mollusca
- Class: Gastropoda
- Subclass: Caenogastropoda
- Order: Neogastropoda
- Superfamily: Conoidea
- Family: Mangeliidae
- Genus: Bela
- Species: B. minoica

Binomial name
- Bela minoica Bogi, Giannuzzi Savelli & Pusateri, 2021

= Bela minoica =

Species of gastropod

Bela minoica is a species of sea snail, a marine gastropod mollusk in the family Mangeliidae.

== Distribution ==
This marine species occurs in the Aegean Sea off Greece and in the Eastern Mediterranean Sea.
