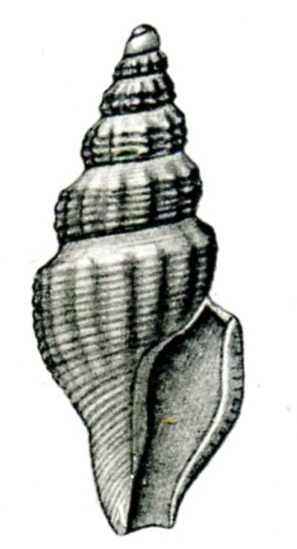
- Drawing of a shell of Bela alma (holotype)

Scientific classification
- Kingdom: Animalia
- Phylum: Mollusca
- Class: Gastropoda
- Subclass: Caenogastropoda
- Order: Neogastropoda
- Superfamily: Conoidea
- Family: Mangeliidae
- Genus: Bela
- Species: B. alma

Binomial name
- Bela alma Thiele, 1925

= Bela alma =

Species of gastropod

Bela alma is a species of sea snail, a marine gastropod mollusk in the family Mangeliidae.

== Description ==
The length of the pale brown shell attains 7 mm, its diameter 2.5 mm.

== Distribution ==
This marine species occurs off the Agulhas Bank, South Africa.
