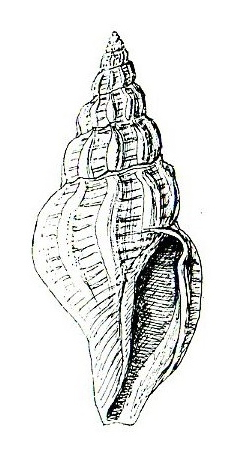
- Drawing of a shell of Bela fortis

Scientific classification
- Kingdom: Animalia
- Phylum: Mollusca
- Class: Gastropoda
- Subclass: Caenogastropoda
- Order: Neogastropoda
- Superfamily: Conoidea
- Family: Mangeliidae
- Genus: Bela
- Species: B. fortis

Binomial name
- Bela fortis (Reeve, 1844)

Synonyms
- Drillia fortis Forbes, 1844; Pleurotoma fortis Reeve, 1844

= Bela fortis =

Species of gastropod

Bela fortis is a species of sea snail, a marine gastropod mollusk in the family Conidae, the cone snails and their allies.

The name of this species is considered a nomen dubium.

== Distribution ==
This species occurs in the Aegean Sea.
