= Bela vulpecula =

Scientific classification
- Kingdom: Animalia
- Phylum: Mollusca
- Class: Gastropoda
- Subclass: Caenogastropoda
- Order: Neogastropoda
- Superfamily: Conoidea
- Family: Mangeliidae
- Genus: Bela
- Species: B. vulpecula

Binomial name
- Bela vulpecula (Brocchi, 1814)

Synonyms
- † Murex vulpeculus Brocchi, 1814 (original combination)

Extinct species of gastropod

Bela vulpecula is an extinct species of sea snail, a marine gastropod mollusk in the family Mangeliidae.

== Distribution ==
This extinct marine species was found in Pleistocene strata in Italy.
