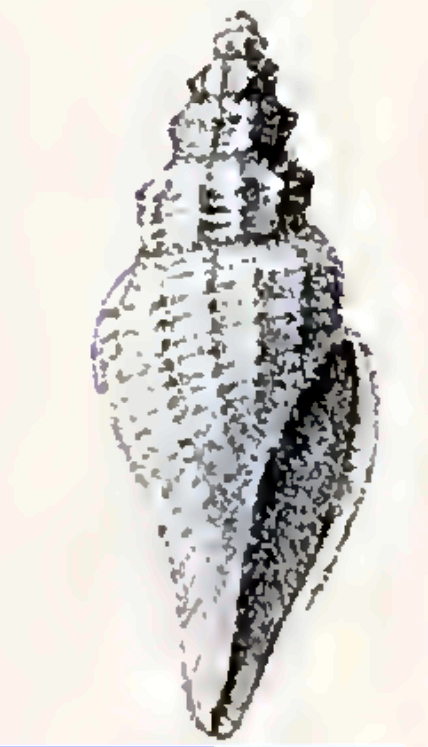
- Original image of Bela barbiton

Scientific classification
- Kingdom: Animalia
- Phylum: Mollusca
- Class: Gastropoda
- Subclass: Caenogastropoda
- Order: Neogastropoda
- Superfamily: Conoidea
- Family: Mangeliidae
- Genus: Bela
- Species: B. barbiton

Binomial name
- Bela barbiton (Melvill, J.C., 1904)

Synonyms
- Mangilia barbiton Melvill, J.C., 1904 (original combination)

= Bela barbiton =

Species of gastropod

Bela barbiton is a species of sea snail, a marine gastropod mollusk in the family Mangeliidae.

== Description ==
The length of the shell attains 8.5 mm, its diameter 3 mm.

== Distribution ==
This species are found in the Gulf of Oman.
