= Bela atlantidea =

Scientific classification
- Kingdom: Animalia
- Phylum: Mollusca
- Class: Gastropoda
- Subclass: Caenogastropoda
- Order: Neogastropoda
- Superfamily: Conoidea
- Family: Mangeliidae
- Genus: Bela
- Species: B. atlantidea

Binomial name
- Bela atlantidea Peñas & Rolán, 2008

Synonyms
- Bela clarae Peñas & Rolán, 2008; Brachycythara atlantidea (Knudsen, 1952); Cythara atlantidea Knudsen, 1952 (original combination)

Species of gastropod

Bela atlantidea is a species of sea snail, a marine gastropod mollusk in the family Mangeliidae.

== Distribution ==
This species occurs in the Mediterranean Sea off Spain and in tropical West Africa waters.
