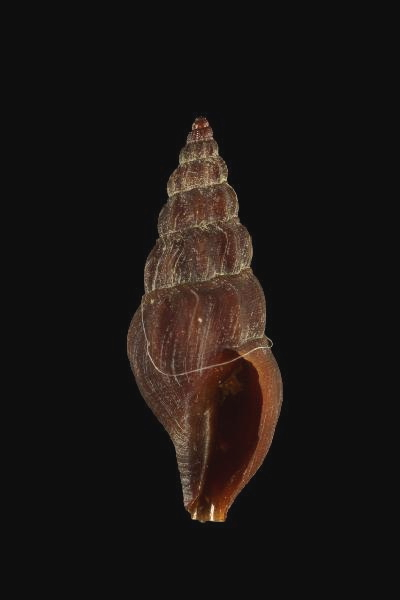
- Shell of Bela fuscata (specimen at MNHN, Paris)

Scientific classification
- Kingdom: Animalia
- Phylum: Mollusca
- Class: Gastropoda
- Subclass: Caenogastropoda
- Order: Neogastropoda
- Superfamily: Conoidea
- Family: Mangeliidae
- Genus: Bela
- Species: B. fuscata

Binomial name
- Bela fuscata (Deshayes, 1835)

Synonyms
- Bela formica F. Nordsieck, 1977 junior subjective synonym; Bela ginnania formica F. Nordsieck, 1977 junior subjective synonym; Drillia fuscata (Deshayes, 1835); Ginnania fuscata (Deshayes, 1835) ·; Mangelia fuscata (Deshayes, 1835); Pleurotoma fusca Calcara, 1839; Pleurotoma fuscata Deshayes, 1835 (basionym); Pleurotoma ginnanianum Philippi, 1844

= Bela fuscata =

Species of gastropod

Bela fuscata is a species of sea snail, a marine gastropod mollusk in the family Mangeliidae.

== Distribution ==
This species is found in European waters off the British Isles and Spain; other specimens were found in the Adriatic Sea and in the Aegean Sea.

Fossil specimens were found in Pleistocene strata in Italy.
