= Bela consimilis =

Scientific classification
- Kingdom: Animalia
- Phylum: Mollusca
- Class: Gastropoda
- Subclass: Caenogastropoda
- Order: Neogastropoda
- Superfamily: Conoidea
- Family: Mangeliidae
- Genus: Bela
- Species: B. consimilis

Binomial name
- Bela consimilis (Harmer, 1915)

Synonyms
- † Bela neerlandica Beets 1946; † Mangelia (Mangelia) keepingi (Etheridge & A. Bell, 1898) forma consimilis (Harmer); † Raphitoma brachystoma (Philippi); † Pleurotoma brachystoma, Phil - NYST, p. 53 (non Pleurotoma brachystoma Philippi, 1844)

Extinct species of gastropod

Bela consimilis is an extinct species of sea snail, a marine gastropod mollusk in the family Mangeliidae.

The length of the shell attains 6.6 mm, its diameter 2.2 mm. This extinct marine species was found in the Lower Pliocene strata in East Anglia, Great Britain.
