= Bela angulifera =

Scientific classification
- Kingdom: Animalia
- Phylum: Mollusca
- Class: Gastropoda
- Subclass: Caenogastropoda
- Order: Neogastropoda
- Family: Mangeliidae
- Genus: Bela
- Species: †B. angulifera

Binomial name
- †Bela angulifera (de Boury, 1899)

Synonyms
- Buchozia angulifera de Boury, 1899

Extinct species of sea snail

Bela angulifera is an extinct species of sea snail, a marine gastropod mollusk in the family Mangeliidae. The apperture of this species is the extremely similar to that of Buchozia citharella, although it has a narrower and less bulging shape.

It was originally described as Buchozia angulifera.
