= Bela tenuistriata =

Scientific classification
- Kingdom: Animalia
- Phylum: Mollusca
- Class: Gastropoda
- Subclass: Caenogastropoda
- Order: Neogastropoda
- Superfamily: Conoidea
- Family: Mangeliidae
- Genus: Bela
- Species: B. tenuistriata

Binomial name
- Bela tenuistriata (A. Bell, 1871)

Synonyms
- Pleurotoma tenuistriata A. Bell, 1871 (original combination); Haedropleura delheidi Vincent, 1890; Raphitoma tenuistriata (A. Bell, 1871); Raphitoma tenuistriata var. carinata (Harmer, 1915); Mangelia (Bela) tenuistriata (A. Bell, 1871)

Extinct species of gastropod

Bela tenuistriata is an extinct species of sea snail. It is a marine gastropod mollusk of the family Mangeliidae.

== Description ==
The length of the shell attains 15.6 mm, its diameter 5.2 mm.

== Distribution ==
This extinct marine species was found in the Lower Pliocene strata in East Anglia, Great Britain, and in Belgium
