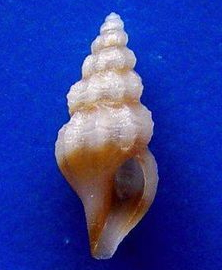
- Shell of Bela cycladensis

Scientific classification
- Kingdom: Animalia
- Phylum: Mollusca
- Class: Gastropoda
- Subclass: Caenogastropoda
- Order: Neogastropoda
- Superfamily: Conoidea
- Family: Mangeliidae
- Genus: Bela
- Species: B. cycladensis

Binomial name
- Bela cycladensis (Reeve, 1845)

Synonyms
- Pleurotoma cycladensis Reeve, 1845

= Bela cycladensis =

Species of gastropod

Bela cycladensis is a species of sea snail, a marine gastropod mollusc in the family Mangeliidae.

== Description ==
The length of the shell attains 8 mm. It locomotes through mucus mediated gliding, reproduces sexually, and has lens eyes.

== Distribution ==
This species is found in the Mediterranean Sea off the Cyclades.
