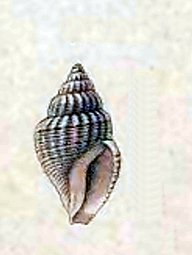
- Image of a shell of Bela decussata

Scientific classification
- Kingdom: Animalia
- Phylum: Mollusca
- Class: Gastropoda
- Subclass: Caenogastropoda
- Order: Neogastropoda
- Superfamily: Conoidea
- Family: Mangeliidae
- Genus: Bela
- Species: B. decussata

Binomial name
- Bela decussata (Locard, 1892)

Synonyms
- Raphitoma decussatum Locard, 1892 (basionym)

= Bela decussata =

Species of gastropod

Bela decussata is a species of sea snail, a marine gastropod mollusk in the family Mangeliidae.

== Taxonomy ==
The taxonomy of Bela decussata (Couthouy, 1839) has changed due to repeated reclassification. The accepted name of this species is neither a primary homonym, nor currently a secondary homonym of B. decussata. Other members of this genus such as Bela arctica have been lumped and split into different genera throughout their history of classification based on morphology. Genetic testing and subsequent phylogenetic clustering would shed light on the specifics of taxonomic relationships with finer detail. B. decussata is a synonym of Curtitoma decussata (Couthouy, 1839) (originally described as Pleurotoma decussatum).

== Description ==
The length of the shell attains 5 mm.

== Distribution ==
This marine species occurs in Atlantic Ocean, France.
