= Bela ampla =

Scientific classification
- Kingdom: Animalia
- Phylum: Mollusca
- Class: Gastropoda
- Subclass: Caenogastropoda
- Order: Neogastropoda
- Superfamily: Conoidea
- Family: Mangeliidae
- Genus: Bela
- Species: B. ampla

Binomial name
- Bela ampla E.A. Smith, 1884

Synonyms
- Obesotoma ampla – Stockland, 1987

Species of gastropod

Bela ampla is a species of sea snail, a marine gastropod mollusk in the family Mangeliidae. It is found in the Arctic Ocean.

== Description ==
The original description of this species by Edgar Albert Smith was only phrased in comparative terms and lacked an image. It was redescribed by Stockland in 1987. Stockland suggested that this species should be placed in the genus Obesotoma. The holotype is in the British Museum (Natural History) no. 198230.

The holotype is 17 mm (0.67 in) in height, ovoid in shape, and has a relatively low, eroded spire. The shell is pale yellowish grey in color. The body whorl is large. The aperture is elongate–oval and has an evenly curved outer lip. The columella is curved in the middle and rather straight otherwise.

== Distribution ==
This marine species occurs in the Arctic Ocean, possibly including the Bering Strait.
