= Bela bella =

Scientific classification
- Kingdom: Animalia
- Phylum: Mollusca
- Class: Gastropoda
- Subclass: Caenogastropoda
- Order: Neogastropoda
- Superfamily: Conoidea
- Family: Mangeliidae
- Genus: Bela
- Species: B. bella

Binomial name
- Bela bella Barnard, 1958

Species of gastropod

Bela bella is a species of sea snail, a marine gastropod mollusk in the family Mangeliidae.

== Description ==
Its shell size spans 10 mm in length, and 3.5 mm in diameter.

== Distribution ==
This marine species has been found in the Agulhas Bank, South Africa.
