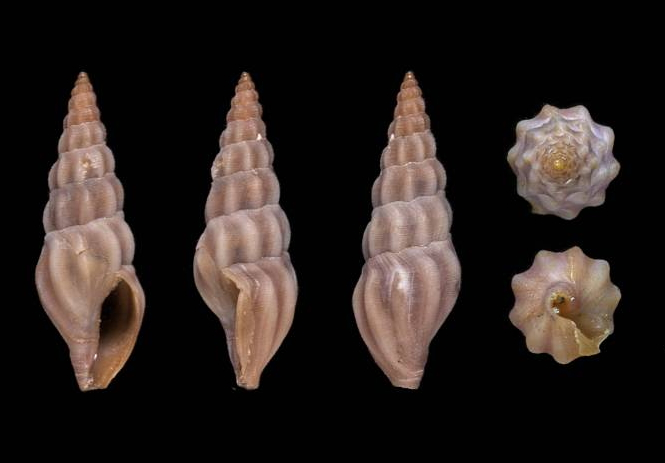
- Shell of Bela nebula (specimen at the Smithsonian Institution)

Scientific classification
- Kingdom: Animalia
- Phylum: Mollusca
- Class: Gastropoda
- Subclass: Caenogastropoda
- Order: Neogastropoda
- Superfamily: Conoidea
- Family: Mangeliidae
- Genus: Bela
- Species: B. nebula

Binomial name
- Bela nebula (Montagu, 1803)

Synonyms
- Bela aegeensis (Reeve, 1844); Bela ginniana (Risso, 1826); Bela nebula vittata Norman, A.M., 1899; Bela septenvillei (Dautzenberg & Durouchoux, 1913); Bela (Ischnula) nebula (Montagu, 1803); Buccinum steveni Krynicky, 1837 (dubious synonym); Fusus discrepans Brown, C.T., 1827; Fusus pyramidatus Brown, C.T., 1827; Mangelia (Bela) nebula (Montagu); Mangelia nebula (Montagu, 1803); Mangelia nebula var. lactea Jeffreys, 1867; Murex nebula Montagu, 1803 (original combination); Pleurotoma metcalfei Petit de la Saussaye, S., 1869; Pleurotoma nebula (Montagu, 1803); Pleurotoma nebula var. abbreviata Jeffreys, 1867; Pleurotoma nebula var. elongata Jeffreys, 1867; Pleurotoma nebula var. abbreviata (Montagu, 1803); Pleurotoma nebula var. minor Jeffreys, 1867; Pleurotoma nigra Potiez, V.L.V., 1838; Raphitoma affine Locard, E.A.A., 1891; Raphitoma nebula (Montagu, 1803); Raphitoma nebula var. septenvillei Dautzenberg, 1913; Raphitoma septenvillei Dautzenberg & Durouchoux, 1913

= Bela nebula =

Nebular needle conch

Species of gastropod

Bela nebula, also known as the nebular needle conch, is a species of sea snail, a marine gastropod mollusk in the family Mangeliidae. It is the type species of the genus Bela.

== Taxonomy ==
Bela nebula forms probably a complex, to which Bela laevigata also belongs (Ankel 1936, Van Aartsen et al. 1984)

== Description ==
The shell size varies between 5 mm and 14 mm, characteristic of the Bela genus, with three or four initially smooth protoconch whorls, except for the last, which features low, curved axial riblets overrun by a few rows of obsolete spiral elements, which form swollen tubercles at the intersection. The shell consists of eight or nine tumid whorls, with deep sutures. The subsutural band is often beaded. The shell shows strong, slightly curved ribs and narrow, spiral ridges and growth lines. The numerous ridges are finely beaded. The subsutural band is slightly swollen. The aperture of the shell is lanceolate and elongated, with a thin outer lip that becomes angular where it meets the body whorl. There is an anal sinus and a short, wide siphonal canal.

The colour of the shell is variable and goes from white to yellowish brown and orange.

The species breeds in spring and summer, depositing eggs in lenticular capsules.

== Distribution ==
This species occurs on sand and muddy gravel bottoms in European waters off Belgium and the British Isles, in the Northeast Atlantic Ocean off Norway, in the Atlantic Ocean off Spain, Portugal, the Azores and Madeira and in the Mediterranean Sea
