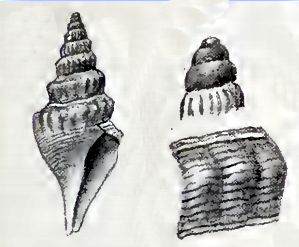
- Original image of a shell of Mangelia martensi

Scientific classification
- Kingdom: Animalia
- Phylum: Mollusca
- Class: Gastropoda
- Subclass: Caenogastropoda
- Order: Neogastropoda
- Superfamily: Conoidea
- Family: Mangeliidae
- Genus: Mangelia
- Species: M. martensi

Binomial name
- Mangelia martensi (Strebel, 1905)

Synonyms
- Bela martensi Strebel, 1905

= Mangelia martensi =

Species of gastropod

Mangelia martensi is a species of sea snail, a marine gastropod mollusk in the family Mangeliidae.

== Description ==
The length of the shell varies between 13 mm and 22 mm.

== Distribution ==
This marine species occurs off the Falkland Islands and in the Magellan Strait, Argentina at a depth between 855 m and 866 m.
