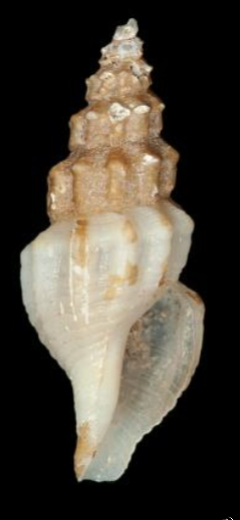
- Shell of Mangelia sculpturata (holotype at the Smithsonian Institution)

Scientific classification
- Kingdom: Animalia
- Phylum: Mollusca
- Class: Gastropoda
- Subclass: Caenogastropoda
- Order: Neogastropoda
- Superfamily: Conoidea
- Family: Mangeliidae
- Genus: Mangelia
- Species: M. sculpturata

Binomial name
- Mangelia sculpturata (Dall, 1887)

Synonyms
- Bela sculpturata Dall, 1887 (original combination); Mangilia sculpturata (Dall, 1887); Oenopota sculpturata (Dall, 1887)

= Mangelia sculpturata =

Species of gastropod

Mangelia sculpturata is a species of sea snail, a marine gastropod mollusk in the family Mangeliidae.

This is not the South African species Mangilia sculpturata Turton, W.H., 1932

== Description ==
The length of the shell attains 12.3 mm, its diameter 3.5 mm.

(Original description) The shell is turreted and contains 7 whorls. It is white, with a strong waxen yellow epidermis. It is thin, with a strong sculpture. The transverse sculpture consists of, on the body whorl, ten strong squarish ribs and numerous fine and occasionally impressed lines of growth. The longitudinal sculpture consists of a distinct angulation of the whorl, in front of the anal fasciole, which on the transverse ribs develops into stout swellings, which in the earlier whorls are connected by an obscure rib. The whole surface of the whorl is covered with rather wide and shallow grooves and their even wider interspaces. The grooves are closest and finest on the siphonal canal and behind the angulation, and faintest or nearly absent on the periphery. The anal notch is very shallow. The fasciole is nearly obsolete. The operculum is short, triangular and yellowish brown.

== Distribution ==
This marine species occurs from the Aleutian Islands to Western Canada.
