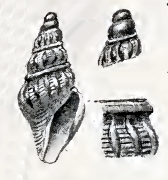
- Original image of a shell (and protoconch) of Mangelia paessleri

Scientific classification
- Kingdom: Animalia
- Phylum: Mollusca
- Class: Gastropoda
- Subclass: Caenogastropoda
- Order: Neogastropoda
- Superfamily: Conoidea
- Family: Mangeliidae
- Genus: Mangelia
- Species: M. paessleri

Binomial name
- Mangelia paessleri (Strebel, 1905)

Synonyms
- Bela paessleri Strebel, 1905; Mangelia (Bela) paessleri H. Strebel, 1905

= Mangelia paessleri =

Species of gastropod

Mangelia paessleri is a species of sea snail, a marine gastropod mollusk in the family Mangeliidae.

== Description ==
The length of the shell attains 3.8 mm.

(Original description in German) The shell is smaller than that of Xymenopsis muriciformis (P. P. King, 1832), the whorls are even more distinctly stepped apart from each other, because the strongest convexity is shifted more towards the suture. The body whorl tapers downwards more rapidly, and the beginning of the constriction occurs somewhat earlier. The coloration is brownish-whitish; on fresh material, a rust-brown coating is frequently noticeable, which, however, seems to originate from iron oxide. The interior shows a light reddish-brown base color, which is modified by a white, streaky, more or less strong enamel layer. The apertural margin, however, is broadly bordered white, and the main part of the siphonal canal is colored dark chestnut-brown. The sculpture is very similar to that of Xymenopsis muriciformis, only the folds are probably somewhat stronger, and the spiral grooves are more continuous and more distinctly pronounced. These, however, are differences that could very well be related to the fresher condition of the shells. The folds are separated by interspaces, as in Xymenopsis muriciformis, and as in that species, individual differences also occur here in the number of spiral grooves and in their arrangement. A more frequent weak convexity of the interspaces may perhaps also be related to the better state of preservation.

The apertural region shows the following deviations from Xymenopsis muriciformis. The columellar base margin is longer and is probably also somewhat steeper; it is coiled like the basal bulge and more strongly curved backwards at the bottom. The lower part of the aperture is probably more correctly called a canal here than a spout, not only because it is longer, but also because it is clearly delimited on the right side by an indentation of the outer margin. The outer margin is not as regularly curved as in Xymenopsis muriciformis, but is also sometimes more strongly bulging below than above. On the inside, the outer margin is covered with a broad, mostly somewhat roof-shaped lip, which, when more developed, bears some small tubercles on its crest; the edge itself is crimped.

== Distribution ==
This marine species occurs off Tierra del Fuego.

It is also found as a fossil in Quaternary strata in Chile; age range: 2.588 to 0.781 Ma
