= Maoritomella eva =

Scientific classification
- Kingdom: Animalia
- Phylum: Mollusca
- Class: Gastropoda
- Subclass: Caenogastropoda
- Order: Neogastropoda
- Superfamily: Conoidea
- Family: Borsoniidae
- Genus: Maoritomella
- Species: M. eva

Binomial name
- Maoritomella eva (Thiele, 1925)

Synonyms
- Asthenotoma eva (Thiele, 1925); Bela eva Thiele, 1925 (original combination); Tomopleura (Maoritomella) eva (Thiele, 1925)

Species of gastropod

Maoritomella eva is a species of sea snail, a marine gastropod mollusk in the family Borsoniidae.

== Description ==
The height of the shell is 4.8 mm, and its width is 2.2 mm.

== Distribution ==
This marine species occurs off the Agulhas Bank, South Africa
