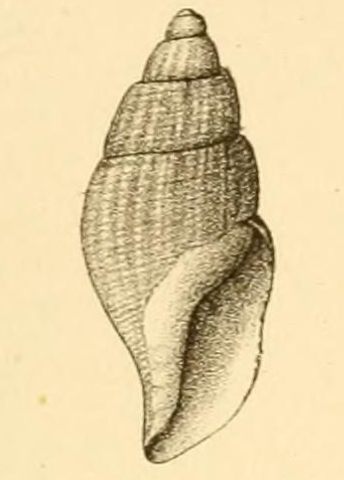
- Shell of Propebela luetkeana (holotype)

Scientific classification
- Kingdom: Animalia
- Phylum: Mollusca
- Class: Gastropoda
- Subclass: Caenogastropoda
- Order: Neogastropoda
- Superfamily: Conoidea
- Family: Mangeliidae
- Genus: Propebela
- Species: P. luetkeana

Binomial name
- Propebela luetkeana (Krause, 1885)

Synonyms
- Bela luetkeana Krause, 1885 (original combination); Bela lütkeana Krause, 1885 (incorrect original spelling)

= Propebela luetkeana =

Species of gastropod

Propebela luetkeana is a species of sea snail, a marine gastropod mollusk in the family Mangeliidae.

== Description ==
The length of the shell attains 12 mm, its diameter 6 mm; the height of the aperture: 5.5 mm

(Original description in Latin) The shell is ovate-fusiform (spindle-shaped), brown, with about six shouldered whorls, scarcely angled above near the suture. The surface is covered by numerous spiral lines and 18–20 slightly prominent longitudinal folds, which are, as it were, divided in half by a longitudinal line, and they reach the siphonal canal on the body whorl.

The radular teeth are lanceolate and they are profoundly rounded and curved in the lower fifth part of the inner margin.

== Distribution ==
This marine species occurs in the Bering Sea
