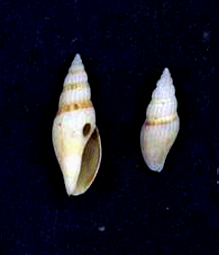
- Shells of Mitraguraleus mitralis (museum specimens at Naturalis Biodiversity Center)

Scientific classification
- Kingdom: Animalia
- Phylum: Mollusca
- Class: Gastropoda
- Subclass: Caenogastropoda
- Order: Neogastropoda
- Superfamily: Conoidea
- Family: Mangeliidae
- Genus: Mitraguraleus
- Species: M. mitralis

Binomial name
- Mitraguraleus mitralis (Adams & Angas, 1864)

Synonyms
- Bela mitralis Adams & Angas, 1864 (original combination); Daphnella mitralis (Adams & Angas, 1864); Guraleus (Mitraguraleus) australis (Adams & Angas, 1864); Guraleus (Mitraguraleus) mitralis (Adams & Angas, 1864); Mangilia australis Sowerby III, 1896; Mangelia australis Hedley, 1913; Mangilia mitralis (Adams & Angas, 1864); Mitraguraleus australis (A. Adams & G.F. Angas, 1864); Guraleus mitralis (Adams & Angas, 1864); Propebela mitralis (Adams & Angas, 1864)

= Mitraguraleus mitralis =

Species of gastropod

Mitraguraleus mitralis is a species of sea snail, a marine gastropod mollusk in the family Mangeliidae. It was originally described as Bela mitralis.

== Description ==
The length of the shell attains 18 millimetres (0.71 in).

(Original description in Latin) The shell is ovate-fusiform and turreted, appearing pale tawny, and adorned with reddish-brown spots at the sutures. The 7 whorls are somewhat angled posteriorly, slightly excavated at the sutures, longitudinally plicate (folded), with the interstices being transversely striated. The ribs become obsolete on the body whorl. The aperture is elongated and narrow. The lip is smooth and simple, and the outer lip is thin and regularly arched.

== Distribution ==
This marine species is endemic to Australia and can be found off New South Wales, Victoria, South Australia, Western Australia and Tasmania.
