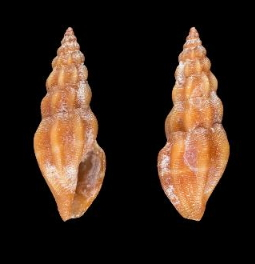
- Shells of Bela menkhorsti (lectotype in MNHN, Paris)

Scientific classification
- Kingdom: Animalia
- Phylum: Mollusca
- Class: Gastropoda
- Subclass: Caenogastropoda
- Order: Neogastropoda
- Superfamily: Conoidea
- Family: Mangeliidae
- Genus: Bela
- Species: B. menkhorsti

Binomial name
- Bela menkhorsti van Aartsen, 1988

Synonyms
- Pleurotoma nana Scacchi, 1836

= Bela menkhorsti =

Species of gastropod

Bela menkhorsti is a species of sea snail, a marine gastropod mollusk in the family Mangeliidae.

== Distribution ==
This species occurs in the Mediterranean Sea and in the Atlantic Ocean off the Azores, Portugal.
