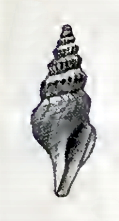
- Original image of a shell of Mangelia gazellae

Scientific classification
- Kingdom: Animalia
- Phylum: Mollusca
- Class: Gastropoda
- Subclass: Caenogastropoda
- Order: Neogastropoda
- Superfamily: Conoidea
- Family: Mangeliidae
- Genus: Mangelia
- Species: M. gazellae

Binomial name
- Mangelia gazellae (Strebel, 1905)

Synonyms
- Bela gazellae Strebel, 1905; Drillia gazellae Strebel, 1905

= Mangelia gazellae =

Species of gastropod

Mangelia gazellae is a species of sea snail, a marine gastropod mollusk in the family Mangeliidae.

== Description ==
The length of the shell varies between 10 mm and 22.5 mm.

(Original description in German) To the excellent diagnosis by von Martens, I have only a few additions to make based on the piece before me. The keel is not gone on the body whorl, but is merely less sharp. Between the keel and the suture, the spiral ridges are weaker, but are discernible on all whorls; only on the keel itself do about 2 of them cease. The spiral ridges are weakly convex, of somewhat unequal width; sometimes narrow ones are inserted between them. On the body whorl, they become more widely spaced downwards, and on the siphonal canal, they also become narrower. I count about 30 up to the keel, and from there to the suture, about 6.

I would like to particularly emphasize the differences that exist between this species and narrowly plicate, which I established. Apart from the considerable size of the shell of Mangelia gasellae, its first whorl is somewhat less broad, but it is also smooth, and the sculpture only begins on the second whorl. The sloping area at the suture is somewhat broader from the upper whorls onwards. The folds thicken nodularly on the keel, whereas in anguste plicata (narrowly plicate), they are much flatter and narrower and partially resemble crumpled folds. The spiral sculpture is coarser and more sharply pronounced.

== Distribution ==
This marine species occurs in the South Atlantic Ocean off Argentina, the Falkland Islands and Tierra del Fuego.
