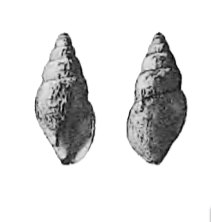
- Image of a shell of Curtitoma violacea

Scientific classification
- Kingdom: Animalia
- Phylum: Mollusca
- Class: Gastropoda
- Subclass: Caenogastropoda
- Order: Neogastropoda
- Superfamily: Conoidea
- Family: Mangeliidae
- Genus: Curtitoma
- Species: C. violacea

Binomial name
- Curtitoma violacea (Mighels & C.B Adams, 1842)

Synonyms
- Bela bicarinata (Couthouy, 1838); Bela bicarinata nodulosa Krause, 1885; Bela bicarinata var. geminolineata Friele, 1879; Bela minuscularia Locard, 1897; Bela violacea (Mighels & Adams, 1842); Bela violacea var. laevior Sars G.O., 1878; Bela violacea var. rufescens Sars G.O., 1878; Defrancia becki Møller, 1842; Defrancia cylindracea Møller, 1842; Oenopota bicarinata (Couthouy, 1838); Pleurotoma (Bela) violacea (Mighels & Adams, 1842); Pleurotoma bicarinata Couthouy, 1838 (non Wood, 1828); Pleurotoma violacea Mighels & Adams, 1842 (original combination)

= Curtitoma violacea =

Species of gastropod

Curtitoma violacea is a species of sea snail, a marine gastropod mollusk in the family Mangeliidae.

== Description ==
The length of the shell varies between 5.5 mm and 16 mm.

The shell is multicarinate, the interstices longitudinally striate. Its color is pale violaceous or whitish, sometimes indistinctly fasciated with a darker color above. The columella is one- or two-plaited. The outer lip is acute, crenulated, and has a slight sinus. The siphonal canal is short.

== Distribution ==
This marine species occurs in the Atlantic Ocean off Eastern Canada to New York City, United States; off Greenland, Spitzbergen, arctic Norway and off France; in the Laptev Sea, Russia; in the Sea of Japan; found at depths between 6 m and 90 m.
