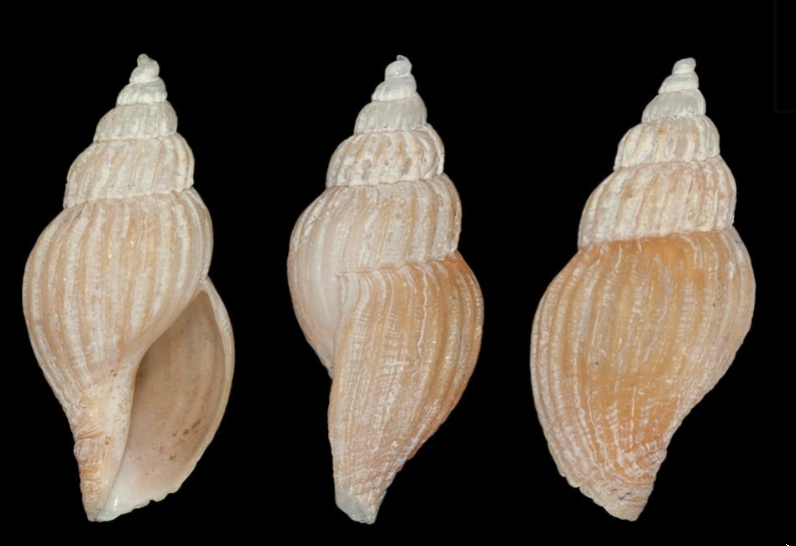
- Shell of Oenopota harpa (holotype at the Smithsonian Institution)

Scientific classification
- Kingdom: Animalia
- Phylum: Mollusca
- Class: Gastropoda
- Subclass: Caenogastropoda
- Order: Neogastropoda
- Superfamily: Conoidea
- Family: Mangeliidae
- Genus: Oenopota
- Species: O. harpa

Binomial name
- Oenopota harpa (Dall, 1885)

Synonyms
- Bela harpa Dall, 1885 (original description); Bela schmidti Friele, 1886; Lora harpa Dall, 1919; Mangilia (Bela) plicifera M.Schmidt, 1872; Nodotoma harpa (Dall, 1885)

= Oenopota harpa =

Species of gastropod

Oenopota harpa is a species of sea snail, a marine gastropod mollusk in the family Mangeliidae.

== Description ==
The length of the shell varies between 8.5 mm and 32 mm.

(Original description) The moderately thin shell has a fusiform shape. It contains six, rounded whorls. The suture is distinct. The sculpture consistis of (on the body whorl) 23 stout, uniform, slightly flexuous rounded ribs extending from the suture to the siphonal canal with slightly narrower interspaces. The lines of increase are distinct, sometimes threadlike. These a re crossed by numerous close-set spiral threads, separated by narrow grooves, both faint near the suture. The threads grow stronger, regularly wider, and coarser gradually toward the siphonal canal, near which they are stronger than the obsolete ends of the transverse ribs. The anal fasciole (notch band) is indistinct. The aperture is narrow, elongated with an acute posterior angle. The outer lip is thin. The columella is simple. The siphonal canal is rather wide. The shell is whitish, with a reddish tinge anteriorly, especially on the body whorl. The interior of the aperture is reddish, of the siphonal canal pure white.

== Distribution ==
This marine species occurs off Arctic Ocean, Russia, in the Sea of Okhotsk and off Alaska and south to Queen Charlotte Sound, British Columbia.
