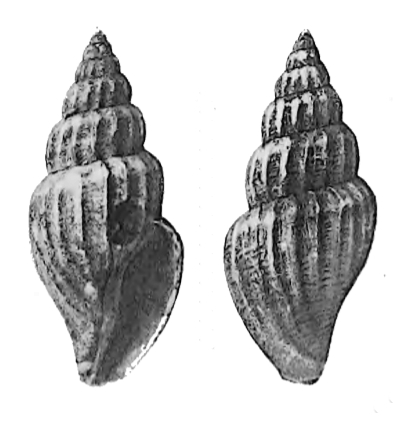
- Image of a shell of Propebela scalaris

Scientific classification
- Kingdom: Animalia
- Phylum: Mollusca
- Class: Gastropoda
- Subclass: Caenogastropoda
- Order: Neogastropoda
- Superfamily: Conoidea
- Family: Mangeliidae
- Genus: Propebela
- Species: P. scalaris

Binomial name
- Propebela scalaris (Møller, 1842)

Synonyms
- Bela americana Packard, 1867 (synonym); Bela scalaris (Møller, 1842); Bela scalaris var. abyssicola Friele, 1886 (synonym); Bela scalaris var. ecarinata Sars G.O., 1878 (synonym); Defrancia scalaris Moller, 1842 Oenopota scalaris (Møller, 1842); Lora scalaris (Møller, 1842); Oenopota scalaris (Møller, 1842) (currently placed in genus Propebela); Pleurotoma scalaris (Møller, 1842)

= Propebela scalaris =

Species of gastropod

Propebela scalaris is a species of sea snail, a marine gastropod mollusk in the family Mangeliidae.

== Description ==
The length of the shell varies between 11 mm and 27 mm.

The shell is elongate. The spire is longer than the aperture. The spiral striation is closer, and more uniform than in Propebela rugidata. The apex is rounded acuminate; on the first whorl, only faint spiral ribs (2–3) are visible.
