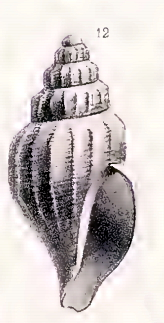
- Shell of Propebela bergensis

Scientific classification
- Kingdom: Animalia
- Phylum: Mollusca
- Class: Gastropoda
- Subclass: Caenogastropoda
- Order: Neogastropoda
- Superfamily: Conoidea
- Family: Mangeliidae
- Genus: Propebela
- Species: P. bergensis

Binomial name
- Propebela bergensis (Friele, 1886)

Synonyms
- Bela bergensis Friele, 1886; Bela detegata Locard, 1897; Bela furfuraculata Locard, 1897; Bela rugulata var. bergensis Friele, 1886; Oenopota bergensis (Friele, 1886)

= Propebela bergensis =

Species of gastropod

Propebela bergensis is a species of sea snail, a marine gastropod mollusk in the family Mangeliidae.

== Description ==
The length of the shell varies between 7.5 mm and 9 mm.

(Original description) The characteristics are close to Propebela rugulata. The spire is somewhat longer than the aperture, and the axial ribs are more numerous than in the typical form.. The apex is obtusely rounded. The first whorl has 3–4 spiral ribs. The operculum is not materially different from the typical one. The teeth, which I have most frequently found, are like those illustrated in the figure with the deep recessment in the side, but the structure differing materially from it occasionally appears.

== Distribution ==
This marine species occurs off the Faroes, in the Barents Sea and off Southwest Sweden
