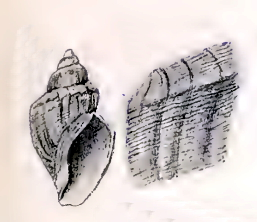
- Original image of a shell of Conorbela antarctica

Scientific classification
- Kingdom: Animalia
- Phylum: Mollusca
- Class: Gastropoda
- Subclass: Caenogastropoda
- Order: Neogastropoda
- Superfamily: Conoidea
- Family: Pseudomelatomidae
- Genus: Conorbela
- Species: C. antarctica

Binomial name
- Conorbela antarctica (Strebel, 1908)

Synonyms
- Bela antarctica Strebel, 1908

= Conorbela antarctica =

Species of gastropod

Conorbela antarctica is a species of sea snail, a marine gastropod mollusk in the family Pseudomelatomidae, the turrids and allies.

== Description ==
The length of the shell varies between 20 mm and 30 mm.

== Distribution ==
This marine species occurs off the South Shetlands, the Antarctic Peninsula and in the Weddell Sea, Antarctica
