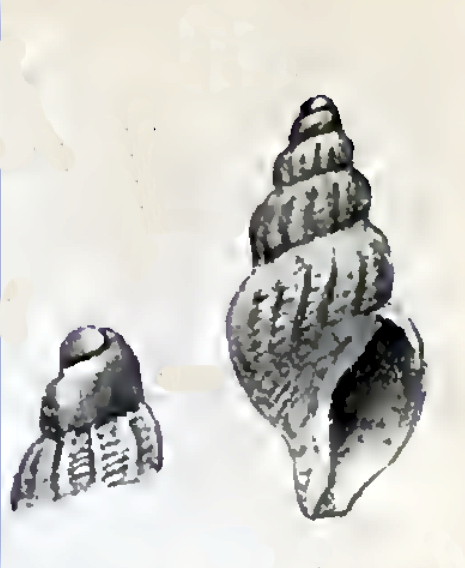
- Original image of a shell (and its protoconch) of Mangelia michaelseni

Scientific classification
- Kingdom: Animalia
- Phylum: Mollusca
- Class: Gastropoda
- Subclass: Caenogastropoda
- Order: Neogastropoda
- Superfamily: Conoidea
- Family: Mangeliidae
- Genus: Mangelia
- Species: M. michaelseni

Binomial name
- Mangelia michaelseni (Strebel, 1905)

Synonyms
- Bela michaelseni H. Strebel, 1905 (original combination)

= Mangelia michaelseni =

Species of gastropod

Mangelia michaelseni is a species of sea snail, a marine gastropod mollusk in the family Mangeliidae.

== Description ==
The length of the shell attains 10 mm. It has a basic spiral type shell. Its colors are cream and tan.

(Original description in German) The shell is fusiform and rather thick-shelled. It is white and is covered with a dirty yellowish cuticle. The umbilical chink is perforate.

The five whorls are rather strongly curved, and they are somewhat sloping at the suture. However, a shoulder is only noticeable on the body whorl, and even there it is only weak. A constriction occurs below. The whorls of the protoconch have a somewhat projecting nucleus. The first 1 1/2 whorls are smooth. The aperture is somewhat rhombically distorted and terminates below in a short, oblique spout. This spout is demarcated on the right side by the fact that the apertural margin is somewhat indented there. On the left, the boundary is formed by the sloping of the inner lip's base, which runs shorter and less vertically than in the two previously mentioned species. The columellar layer is narrow and does not extend to the base, so that the basal angulation is clearly noticeable on the side.

The sculpture begins after the first smooth whorls, and it consists of rounded, rather high folds that are separated by spaces of equal or greater width. They are narrower on the flattened sutural zone and hardly reach below the middle height of the whorl on the body whorl, and they also become weaker toward the aperture. As no specimen with a completely preserved apertural margin is present, it is questionable whether the full growth has been reached. According to the preceding part of the whorl, the course of the folds is such that they are directed a little obliquely backward from the suture, then curve forward, running downward in a shallow arc. It is, therefore, not probable that a particularly noticeable indentation occurs at the aperture above, even though the change in direction indicates the turrid character. I count 19 folds on the body whorl.The spiral sculpture consists of rounded spiral cords that mostly pass over the folds. They are narrower and stand closer on the sutural zone, but they become broader and flatter toward the base and have more distinct interstices; they are absent on the aperture. The author counts 19 such cords on the body whorl.

== Distribution ==
This marine species occurs off Uruguay and in the Magellanic Strait
