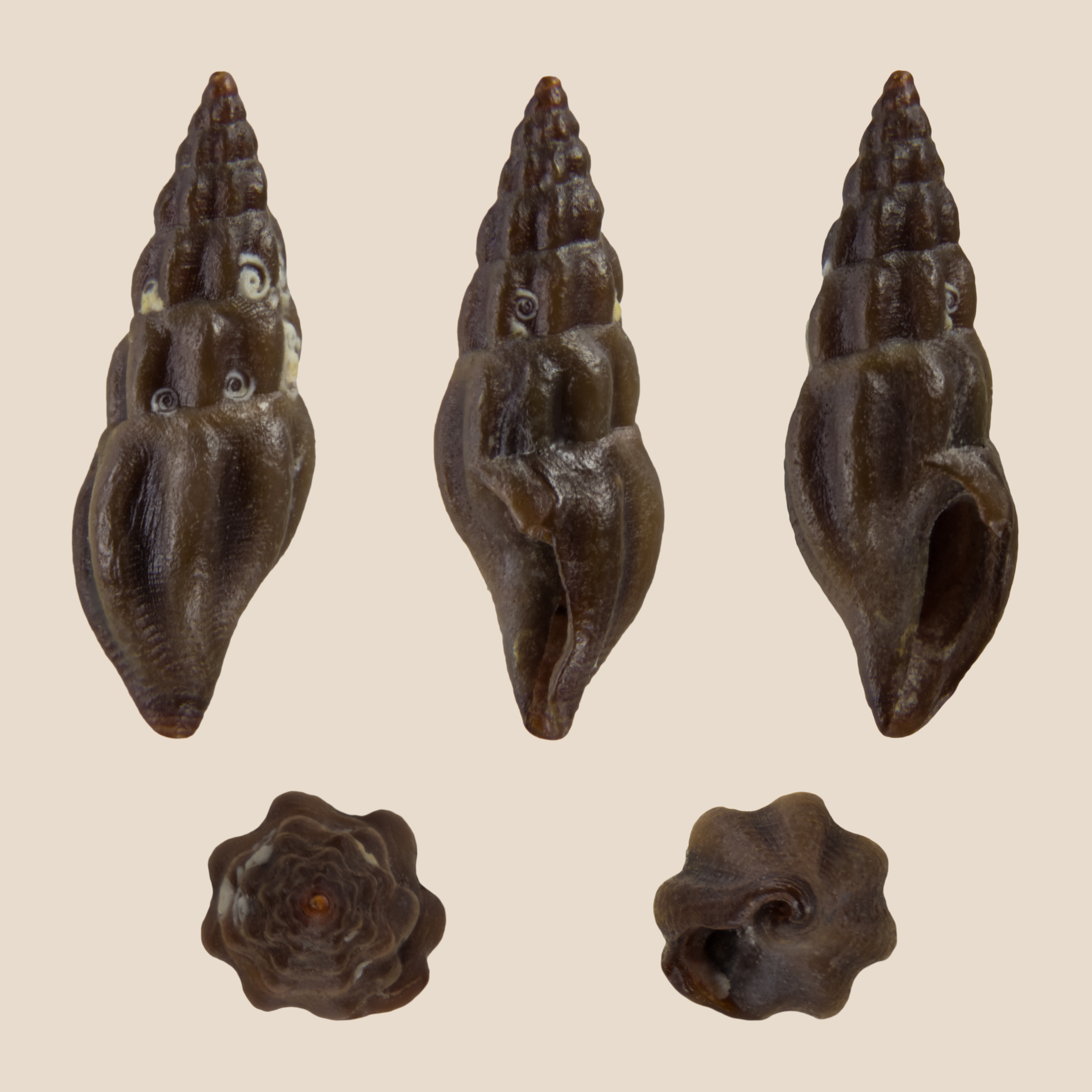
- Haedropleura septangularis shell

Scientific classification
- Kingdom: Animalia
- Phylum: Mollusca
- Class: Gastropoda
- Subclass: Caenogastropoda
- Order: Neogastropoda
- Superfamily: Conoidea
- Family: Horaiclavidae
- Genus: Haedropleura
- Species: H. septangularis

Binomial name
- Haedropleura septangularis (Montagu, 1803)

Synonyms
- Bela ginnania (Risso, 1826); Bellaspira septangularis (Montagu, 1803); Bela septangularis var. parvulata Sacco, 1904; Bellaspira rigida (Reeve, 1846); Bellaspira septangularis (Montagu, 1803); Daphnella goreensis Maltzan, 1883 -; Haedropleura septangularis septangularis rigida (Reeve, 1846); Mangelia ginnania Risso, 1826; Mangelia rigida Reeve, 1846 (original combination); Murex septangularis Montagu, 1803; Murex septemangulatus Donovan, 1804 (dubious synonym); Pleurotoma heptagona Scacchi, 1835

= Haedropleura septangularis =

Species of gastropod

Haedropleura septangularis, common name the seven-ribbed conelet, is a species of sea snail, a marine gastropod mollusk in the family Horaiclavidae.

== Description ==
The size of an adult shell varies between 9 mm and 12 mm. The shell is pale yellowish or almost white, with distant strong ribs. The shoulder has brown dashes or spots, appearing on the ribs only. There is usually, on the body whorl a central line of spots, also on the ribs.

== Distribution ==
This species occurs in the Mediterranean Sea and in the eastern Atlantic Ocean.
