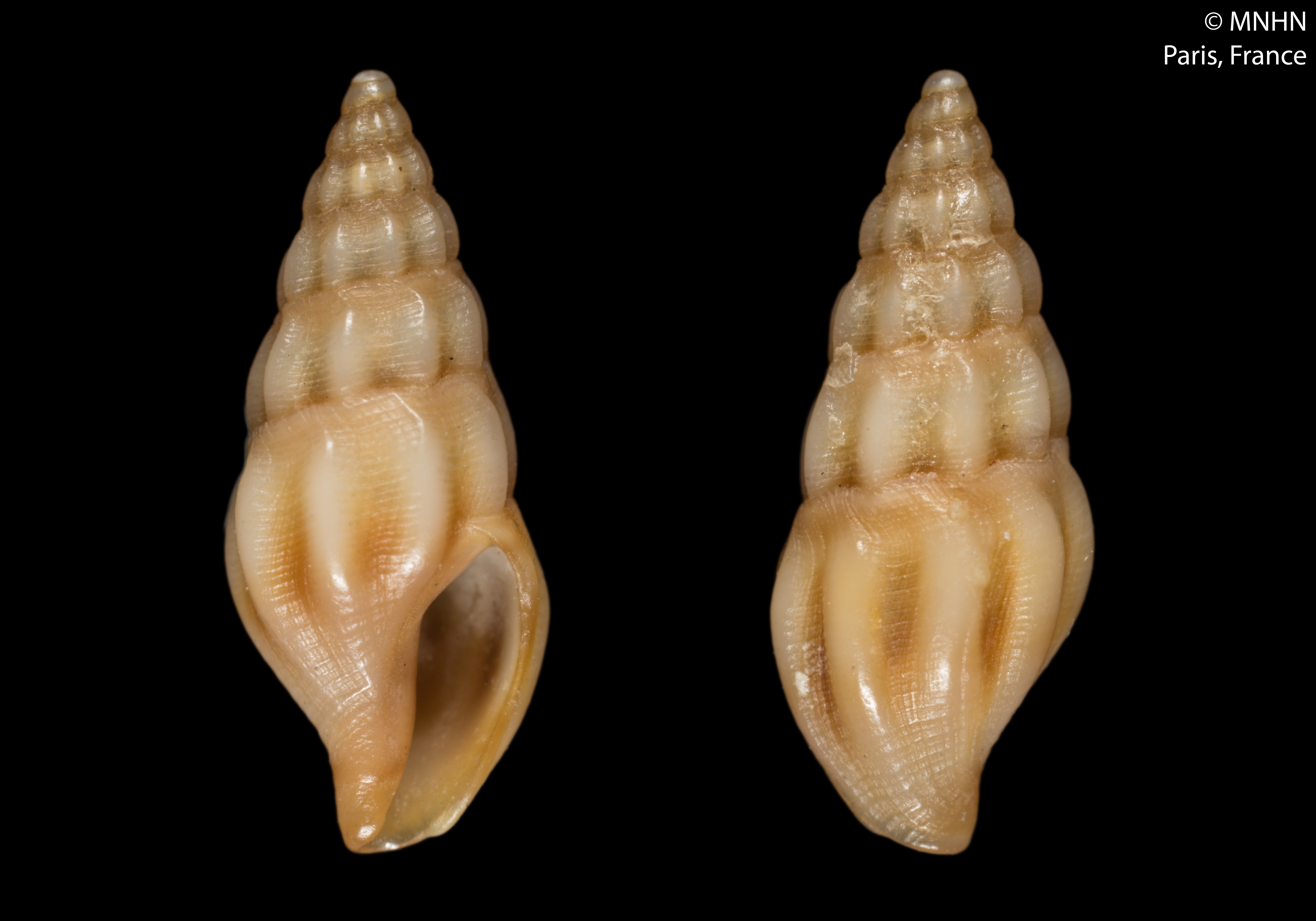
- Shells of Mangelia costulata (syntype at MNHN, Paris)

Scientific classification
- Kingdom: Animalia
- Phylum: Mollusca
- Class: Gastropoda
- Subclass: Caenogastropoda
- Order: Neogastropoda
- Superfamily: Conoidea
- Family: Mangeliidae
- Genus: Mangelia
- Species: M. costulata

Binomial name
- Mangelia costulata Risso, 1826

Synonyms
- Bela costulata (Risso, 1826); Bela costulata scacchii Nordsieck, 1972; Bela ornata (Locard, 1891); Cythara altenai Brackman, 1938; Mangelia altenai Brackman, 1938 (dubious synonym); Mangelia costulata Blainville, 1829 (specific name erroneously credited to Blainville ); Mangelia smithii (Forbes, 1840); Mangelia wareni Piani, 1980; Pleurotoma farrani Thompson W., 1845; Pleurotoma loeviana Reeve, 1845 (original combination); Pleurotoma smithii Forbes, 1840; Pleurotoma striolatum (Risso, 1826) sensu Philippi, 1844; Raphitoma exstriolata Cerulli-Irelli, 1910; Raphitoma ornata Locard, 1892 (original combination); Raphitoma rissoi Locard, 1886; Raphitoma strictum Locard, 1891; Raphitoma substriolata Harmer, 1918 (dubious synonym); Smithia striolata Monterosato, 1884; Smithiella costulata (Risso, 1826); Smithiella loeviana (Reeve, 1845)

= Mangelia costulata =

Species of gastropod

Mangelia costulata is a species of sea snail, a marine gastropod mollusk in the family Mangeliidae, the cone snails and their allies.

== Description ==
The shell is longitudinally ribbed continuing to the base of the body whorl, crossed by spiral striae. The sinus is broad and shallow. Its color is chestnut or horny brown, interior similarly colored.

== Distribution ==
This species occurs in European waters and in the Mediterranean Sea.
