= Sorgenfreispira africana =

Scientific classification
- Kingdom: Animalia
- Phylum: Mollusca
- Class: Gastropoda
- Subclass: Caenogastropoda
- Order: Neogastropoda
- Superfamily: Conoidea
- Family: Mangeliidae
- Genus: Sorgenfreispira
- Species: S. africana

Binomial name
- Sorgenfreispira africana Ardovini, 2004

Synonyms
- Bela africana Ardovini, 2008 (Described a second time by the same author on the erroneous assumption that his first publication at the rank of subspecies was invalid); Bela brachystoma africana Ardovini, 2004 (basionym)

Species of gastropod

Sorgenfreispira africana is a species of sea snail, a marine gastropod mollusk in the family Mangeliidae.

== Description ==
The adult shell grows to a length of 4 mm, its diameter 1.6 mm.

== Distribution ==
This species is found in the Atlantic Ocean off Senegal and Angola.
