= Luigi Bellardi =

Italian malacologist and entomologist

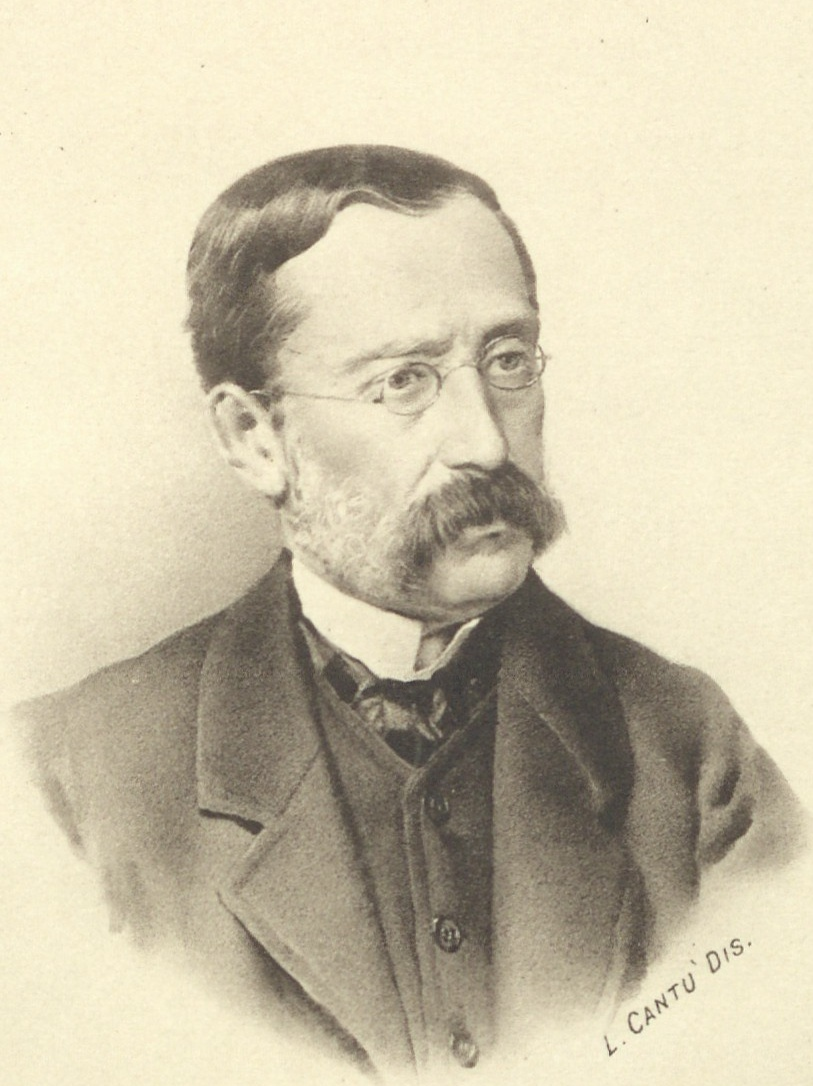
- Born: May 18, 1818; Genoa
- Died: September 17, 1889 (aged 71); Turin
- Occupations: Malacologist and entomologist

Luigi Bellardi (18 May 1818 – 17 September 1889) was an Italian malacologist and entomologist who specialised in Diptera.

Bellardi was born in Genoa and died in Turin. His collection is in the Turin Museum of Natural History

In 1872, then a professor at Liceo Gioberti, Luigi Bellardi began I molluschi dei terreni terziari del Piemonte della Liguria, a work on molluscs of the Middle and Early Tertiary in the Mediterranean basin. In 1888 he published the five parts dealing with Cephalopoda, Pteropoda and the first families of Gastropoda. In 1889 his student Prof. Federico Sacco (1864–1948) took over this work and published 25 more sections partly based on Bellardi’s work on this species-rich fossil group.

A list of his publications can be found at the database WoRMS.
