= List of marine gastropods of Ireland =

This is a list of the marine gastropods of Ireland. It is part of the List of marine molluscs of Ireland.

== Marine gastropods ==
Akeridae

- Akera bullata O. F. Müller, 1776

Aplysiidae

- Aplysia depilans Gmelin, 1791
- Aplysia fasciata Poiret, 1789
- Aplysia punctata Cuvier, 1803

Acmaeidae

- Tectura virginea (O. F. Müller, 1776)

Lepetidae

- Iothia fulva (O. F. Müller, 1776)
- Propilidium exiguum (Thompson W., 1844)

Lottiidae

- Testudinalia testudinalis (O.F. Müller, 1776)

Patellidae

- Helcion pellucidum (Linnaeus, 1758)
- Patella depressa Pennant, 1777#
- Patella ulyssiponensis Gmelin, 1791
- Patella vulgata Linnaeus, 1758

Janthinidae

- Janthina exigua Lamarck, 1816
- Janthina janthina (Linnaeus, 1758)
- Janthina pallida Thompson W., 1840

Acteonidae

- Acteon tornatilis (Linnaeus, 1758)

Cylichnidae

- Cylichna cylindracea (Pennant, 1777)

Diaphanidae

- Colpodaspis pusilla M. Sars, 1870
- Diaphana minuta T. Brown, 1827

Haminoeidae

- Haminoea hydatis (Linnaeus, 1758)
- Haminoea navicula (da Costa, 1778)

Philinidae

- Laona pruinosa (Clark W., 1827)
- Philine aperta (Linnaeus, 1767)
- Philine catena (Montagu, 1803)
- Philine denticulata (J. Adams, 1800)
- Philine punctata (J. Adams, 1800)
- Philine quadrata (S. V. Wood, 1839)
- Philine scabra (O. F. Müller, 1784)

Retusidae

- Retusa obtusa (Montagu, 1803)
- Retusa truncatula (Bruguière, 1792)
- Retusa umbilicata (Montagu, 1803)

Runcinidae

- Runcina coronata (Quatrefages, 1844)

Scaphandridae

- Roxania utriculus (Brocchi, 1814)
- Scaphander lignarius (Linnaeus, 1758)

Cimidae

- Cima minima (Jeffreys, 1858)

Ebalidae

- Ebala nitidissima (Montagu, 1803)

Omalogyridae

- Omalogyra atomus (Philippi, 1841)

Pyramidellidae

- Brachystomia eulimoides (Hanley, 1844)
- Brachystomia scalaris (Macgillivray, 1843)
- Chrysallida clathrata (Jeffreys, 1848)
- Chrysallida decussata (Montagu, 1803)
- Chrysallida excavata (Philippi, 1836)
- Chrysallida indistincta (Montagu, 1808)
- Chrysallida interstincta (J Adams, 1797)
- Chrysallida pellucida (Dillwyn, 1817)

Rissoellidae

- Rissoella diaphana (Alder, 1848)
- Rissoella globularis (Forbes & Hanley, 1852)
- Rissoella opalina (Jeffreys, 1848)

Aclididae

- Aclis ascaris (Turton, 1819)
- Aclis gulsonae (Clark W., 1850)
- Aclis minor (Brown, 1827)

Aporrhaiidae

- Aporrhais pespelecani (Linnaeus, 1758)

Barleeidae

- Barleeia rubra (Montagu, 1803)
- Barleeia unifasciata (Montagu, 1803)

Caecidae

- Caecum glabrum (Montagu, 1803)
- Caecum imperforatum (Kanmacher in G Adams, 1798)

Capulidae

- Capulus ungaricus (Linnaeus, 1758)
- Trichotropis borealis Broderip & Sowerby G.B. I, 1829

Cerithiidae

- Bittium reticulatum (da Costa, 1778)
- Cerithium muscarum Say, 1822

Cerithiopsidae

- Cerithiopsis barleei Jeffreys, 1867
- Cerithiopsis jeffreysi Watson, 1885
- Cerithiopsis tubercularis (Montagu, 1803)

Cingulopsidae

- Eatonina fulgida (Adams J., 1797)

Epitoniidae

- Epitonium clathratulum (Kanmacher in G Adams, 1798)
- Epitonium clathrus (Linnaeus, 1758)
- Epitonium trevelyanum (Johnston, 1841)
- Epitonium turtonis (Turton, 1819)

Eulimidae

- Eulima bilineata Alder, 1848
- Eulima glabra (da Costa, 1778)
- Eulimella acicula (Philippi, 1836)
- Eulimella compactilis (Jeffreys, 1867)
- Eulimella scillae (Scacchi, 1835)
- Eulimella ventricosa (Forbes, 1844)
- Eulitoma compactilis (Sykes, 1903)
- Melanella alba (da Costa, 1778)
- Melanella frielei (Jordan, 1895)
- Melanella lubrica (Monterosato, 1890)

Hydrobiidae

- Hydrobia ulvae (Pennant, 1777)

Iravadiidae

- Ceratia proxima (Forbes & Hanley, 1850)
- Hyala vitrea (Montagu, 1803)

Lamellariidae

- Lamellaria latens (O.F. Müller, 1776)
- Lamellaria perspicua (Linnaeus, 1758)

Littorinidae

- Lacuna crassior (Montagu, 1803)
- Lacuna pallidula (da Costa, 1778)
- Lacuna parva (da Costa, 1778)
- Lacuna vincta (Montagu, 1803)
- Littorina irrorata (Say, 1822)
- Littorina littorea (Linnaeus, 1758)
- Littorina mariae Sacchi & Rastelli, 1966
- Littorina neglecta Bean in Thorpe, 1844
- Littorina neritoides (Linnaeus, 1758)
- Littorina nigrolineata J.E. Gray, 1839
- Littorina obtusata Linnaeus, 1758
- Littorina saxatilis (Olivi, 1792)
- Littorina tenebrosa (Montagu)

Naticidae

- Euspira catena (da Costa, 1778)
- Euspira fusca (de Blainville, 1825)
- Euspira montagui (Forbes, 1838)
- Euspira pulchella (Risso, 1826)
- Polinices fuscus (Blainville, 1825)
- Polinices pulchellus (Risso, 1826)

Ovulidae

- Simnia patula (Pennant, 1777)

Rissoidae

- Alvania beanii (Hanley in Thorpe, 1844)
- Alvania cancellata (da Costa, 1778)
- Alvania punctura (Montagu, 1803)
- Alvania semistriata (Montagu, 1808)
- Alvania zetlandica (Montagu, 1815)
- Cingula alderi (Jeffreys, 1859)
- Cingula semicostata (Montagu, 1803)
- Cingula trifasciata (Adams J., 1800)
- Manzonia crassa (Kanmacher in G Adams, 1798)
- Onoba aculeus (Gould, 1841)
- Onoba proxima Forbes & Hanley, 1850
- Onoba semicostata (Montagu, 1803)
- Hyala vitrea (Montagu, 1803)
- Pusillina sarsi (Lovén, 1846)
- Pusillina inconspicua (Alder, 1844)
- Rissoa interrupta (J. Adams, 1800)
- Rissoa lilacina Recluz, 1843
- Rissoa membranacea (J. Adams, 1800)
- Rissoa parva (da Costa, 1778)

Skeneopsidae

- Skeneopsis planorbis (O Fabricius, 1780)

Tornidae

- Tornus subcarinatus (Montagu, 1803)
- Tornus unisulcatus (G. W. Chaster, 1895)

Triphoridae

- Marshallora adversa (Montagu, 1803)
- Triphora perversa (Linnaeus, 1758)

Triviidae

- Erato voluta (Montagu, 1803)
- Trivia arctica (Pulteney, 1799)
- Trivia monacha (da Costa, 1778)

Turritellidae

- Turritella communis Risso, 1826
- Turritella cingulata G. B. Sowerby I, 1825

Velutinidae

- Velutina plicatilis (O. F. Müller, 1776)
- Velutina velutina (O. F. Müller, 1776)

Buccinidae

- Beringius turtoni (Bean, 1834)
- Buccinum humphreysianum (Bennett, 1824)
- Buccinum hydrophanum (Hancock, 1846)
- Buccinum undatum Linnaeus, 1758
- Chauvetia brunnea (Donovan, 1804)
- Colus glaber (Kobelt, 1876)
- Colus gracilis (da Costa, 1778)
- Colus islandicus (Gmelin, 1791)
- Colus jeffreysianus (Fischer, 1868)
- Tritia incrassata (Strøm, 1768)
- Tritia reticulata (Linnaeus, 1758)
- Liomesus ovum (Turton, 1825)
- Nassarius pygmaeus (Lamarck, 1822)
- Nassarius reticulatus (Linnaeus, 1758)
- Neptunea antiqua (Linnaeus, 1758)
- Turrisipho fenestratus (Turton, 1834)
- Turrisipho moebii (Dunker & Metzger, 1874)
- Volutopsius norwegicus (Gmelin, 1791)

Conidae

- Bela nebula (Montagu, 1803)
- Bela powisiana (Dautzenberg, 1887)
- Mangelia attenuata (Montagu, 1803)
- Mangelia brachystoma (Philippi, 1844)
- Mangelia coarctata (Forbes, 1840)
- Trophonopsis muricata (Montagu, 1803)
- Philbertia gracilis (Montagu)
- Raphitoma leufroyi (Michaud, 1828)
- Philbertia teres (Reeve)
- Propebela rufa (Montagu, 1803)
- Propebela turricula Montagu, 1803

Muricidae

- Boreotrophon truncatus (Ström, 1768)
- Nucella lapillus (Linnaeus, 1758)
- Ocenebra erinaceus (Linnaeus, 1758)
- Trophonopsis barvicensis (Johnston, 1825)
- Trophonopsis muricatus (Montagu, 1803)
- Trophonopsis truncatus (Ström, 1768)

Turridae

- Comarmondia gracilis (Montagu, 1803)
- Raphitoma linearis (Montagu, 1803)
- Raphitoma purpurea (Montagu, 1803)
- Teretia anceps (Eichwald, 1830)
- Haedropleura septangularis (Montagu, 1803)
- Oenopota rufa (Montagu, 1803)
- Oenopota turricula (Montagu, 1803)

Assimineidae

- Assiminea grayana (Fleming, 1828)

Calyptraeidae

- Crepidula fornicata (Linnaeus, 1758)

Hydrobiidae

- Hydrobia acuta (Draparnaud, 1805)
- Hydrobia ventrosa (Montagu, 1803)
- Mercuria similis (Draparnaud, 1805)
- Peringia ulvae (Pennant, 1777)
- Ventrosia ventrosa (Montagu, 1803)

Truncatellidae

- Truncatella subcylindrica (Linnaeus, 1767)

Pleurobranchidae

- Berthella plumula (Montagu, 1803)
- Pleurobranchus membranaceus (Montagu, 1815)

== See also ==
- List of non-marine molluscs of Ireland

Lists of molluscs of surrounding countries:

- List of non-marine molluscs of Great Britain
- List of marine molluscs of Island
