= N. truncatus =

N. truncatus may refer to:

- Neuroxena truncatus, a moth species found in Ghana
- Notonomus truncatus, a ground beetle species

== See also ==
- Truncatus (disambiguation)
