= Truncatus =

Truncatus may refer to:

- The common bottlenose dolphin, Tursiops truncatus
- Bulinus truncatus, a freshwater snail species found in Senegal
- Boreotrophon truncatus, the bobtail trophon, a sea snail species
- Neuroxena truncatus, a moth species found in Ghana
- Notonomus truncatus, a ground beetle species

== See also ==
- C. truncata (disambiguation)
