= B. truncatus =

B. truncatus may refer to:

- Bulinus truncatus, a freshwater snail species found in Senegal
- Boreotrophon truncatus, the bobtail trophon, a sea snail species

== See also ==
- Truncatus (disambiguation)
