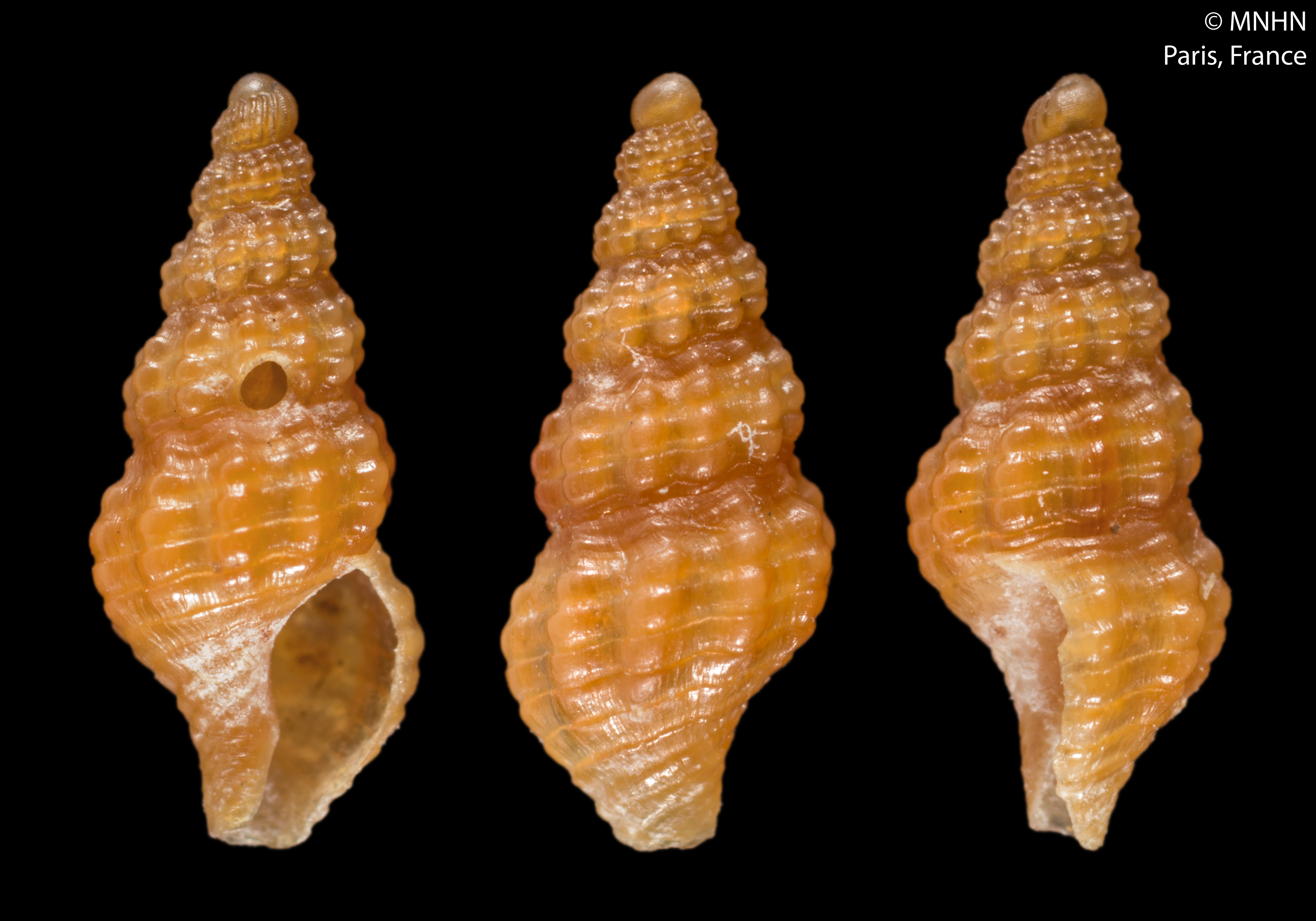
- Shell of Chauvetia mamillata (lectotype at MNHN, Paris)

Scientific classification
- Kingdom: Animalia
- Phylum: Mollusca
- Class: Gastropoda
- Subclass: Caenogastropoda
- Order: Neogastropoda
- Family: Chauvetiidae
- Genus: Chauvetia
- Species: C. mamillata

Binomial name
- Chauvetia mamillata (Risso, 1826)

Synonyms
- Buccinum minimum R. A. Philippi, 1836 (invalid: junior homonym of Buccinum minimum Montagu, 1803) ·; Chauvetia submamillata (Bucquoy, Dautzenberg & Dollfus, 1882); Donovania minima var. attenuata Bucquoy, Dautzenberg & Dollfus, 1883; Donovania minima var. insignis Bucquoy, Dautzenberg & Dollfus, 1883 (dubious syn.); Donovania minima var. nodulifera Bucquoy, Dautzenberg & Dollfus, 1883; Donovania minima var. submamillata Bucquoy, Dautzenberg & Dollfus, 1883; Lachesis mamillata Risso, 1826 (dubious synonym); Nesaea granulata Risso, 1826; Nesaea mamillata Risso, 1826

= Chauvetia mamillata =

Species of gastropod

Chauvetia mamillata is a species of sea snail, a marine gastropod mollusk in the family Chauvetiidae, the true whelks.
