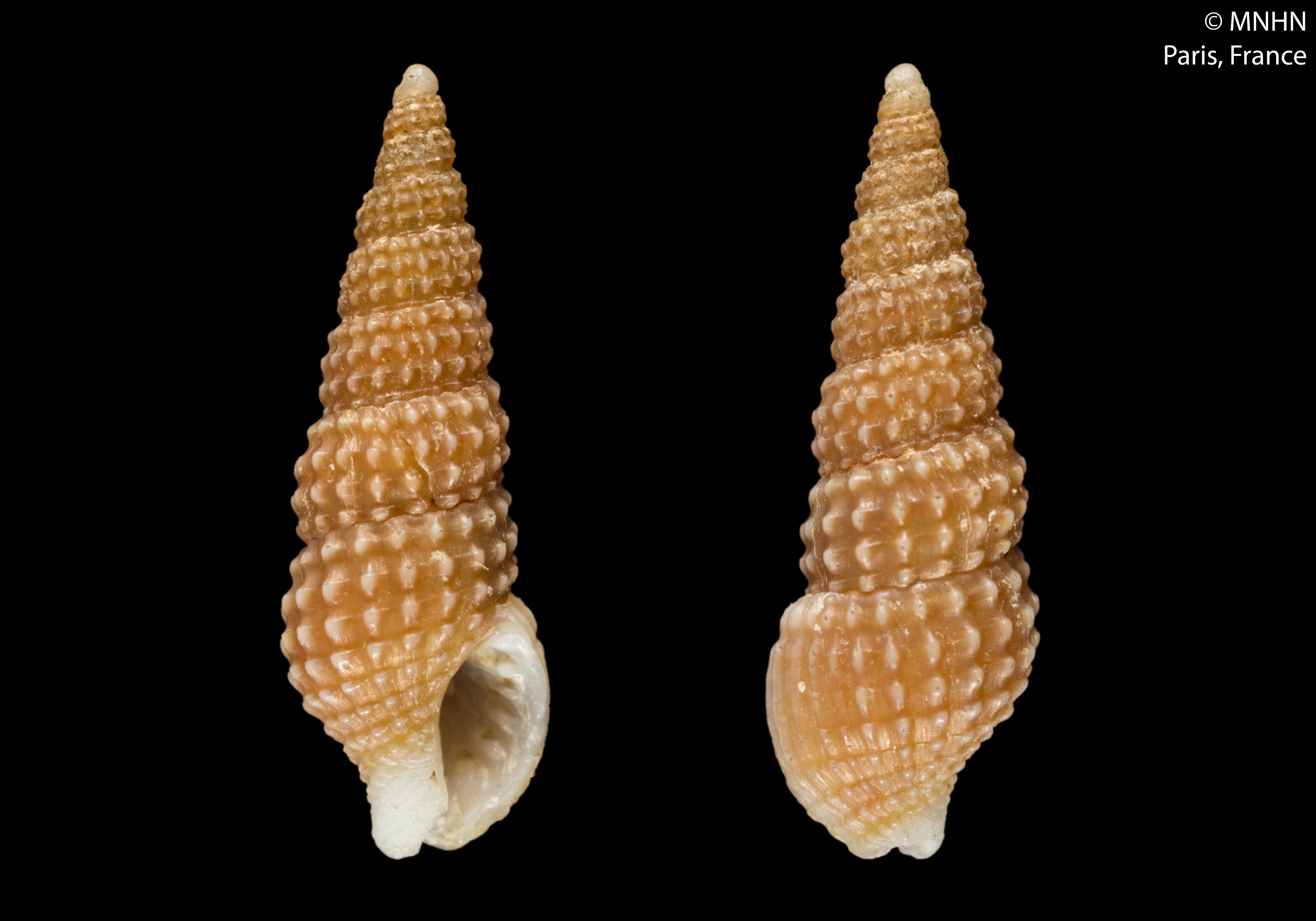
- Shell of Chauvetia gigantea (holotype at MNHN, Paris)

Scientific classification
- Kingdom: Animalia
- Phylum: Mollusca
- Class: Gastropoda
- Subclass: Caenogastropoda
- Order: Neogastropoda
- Family: Chauvetiidae
- Genus: Chauvetia
- Species: C. gigantea

Binomial name
- Chauvetia gigantea Oliver & Rolan, 2008

= Chauvetia gigantea =

Species of gastropod

Chauvetia gigantea is a species of sea snail, a marine gastropod mollusc in the family Chauvetiidae, the true whelks.

== Distribution ==
This marine species occurs off Senegal.
