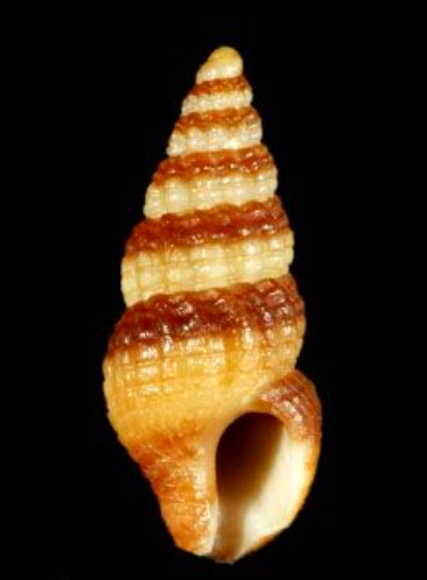
- Shell of Chauvetia decorata (specimen at the Natural History Museum, Rotterdam)

Scientific classification
- Kingdom: Animalia
- Phylum: Mollusca
- Class: Gastropoda
- Subclass: Caenogastropoda
- Order: Neogastropoda
- Family: Chauvetiidae
- Genus: Chauvetia
- Species: C. decorata

Binomial name
- Chauvetia decorata Monterosato, 1889

= Chauvetia decorata =

Species of gastropod

Chauvetia decorata is a species of sea snail, a marine gastropod mollusk in the family Chauvetiidae, the true whelks.

== Description ==
The length of the shell attains 8 mm.

== Distribution ==
This marine species occurs in the Strait of Gibraltar and off the Canary Islands.
