= Chauvetia tenebrosa =

Scientific classification
- Kingdom: Animalia
- Phylum: Mollusca
- Class: Gastropoda
- Subclass: Caenogastropoda
- Order: Neogastropoda
- Family: Chauvetiidae
- Genus: Chauvetia
- Species: C. tenebrosa

Binomial name
- Chauvetia tenebrosa Oliver & Rolan, 2008

Species of gastropod

Chauvetia tenebrosa is a species of sea snail, a marine gastropod mollusc in the family Chauvetiidae, the true whelks.

== Distribution ==
This marine species occurs off Senegal.
