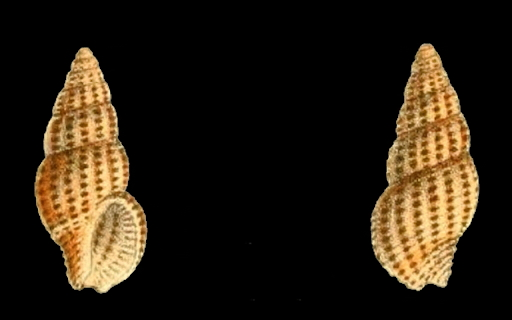
- Shell of Chauvetia lineolata

Scientific classification
- Kingdom: Animalia
- Phylum: Mollusca
- Class: Gastropoda
- Subclass: Caenogastropoda
- Order: Neogastropoda
- Family: Chauvetiidae
- Genus: Chauvetia
- Species: C. lineolata

Binomial name
- Chauvetia lineolata (Tiberi, 1868)

Synonyms
- Nesaea lineolata Tiberi, 1868 ·

= Chauvetia lineolata =

Species of gastropod

Chauvetia lineolata is a species of sea snail, a marine gastropod mollusk in the family Chauvetiidae, the true whelks.

== Description ==
The length of the shell attains 11 mm, its diameter 5 mm.

(Original description in Latin) The shell is elongated and turreted, with a whitish color. It is elegantly latticed with longitudinal ribs and transverse bands.

The 18 to 20 ribs are colorless and not granulated. The bands between the ribs are decorated with interrupted reddish lines. The spire is very elevated and has a mammillated (nipple-like) apex. The seven whorls are rounded and separated by a deep suture. The aperture is ovate (egg-shaped) and is nearly equal to one-third of the total length. The outer lip is remotely grooved on the inside, and lined on the outside with a strong varix (a thickened ridge). The siphonal canal is dilated at its base.

== Distribution ==
This species occurs in the Mediterranean Sea off Italy, Malta and Greece.
