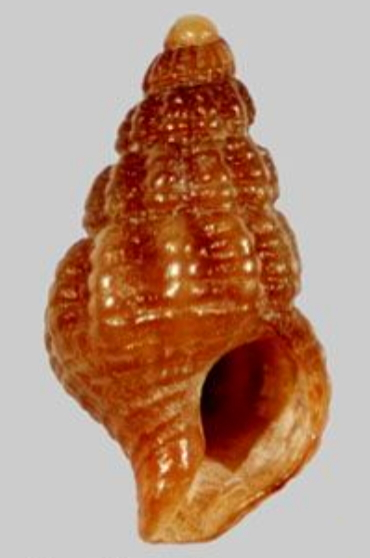
- Shell of Chauvetia crassior (specimen at the Natural History Museum, Rotterdam)

Scientific classification
- Kingdom: Animalia
- Phylum: Mollusca
- Class: Gastropoda
- Subclass: Caenogastropoda
- Order: Neogastropoda
- Family: Chauvetiidae
- Genus: Chauvetia
- Species: C. crassior

Binomial name
- Chauvetia crassior (Odhner, 1932)

Synonyms
- Syntagma crassior Odhner, 1932 superseded combination

= Chauvetia crassior =

Species of gastropod

Chauvetia crassior is a species of sea snail, a marine gastropod mollusk in the family Chauvetiidae, the true whelks.

== Description ==
The length of the shell attains 4.6 mm.

== Distribution ==
This species occurs in the Atlantic Ocean off the Canary Islands.
