= Melanella translucens =

- Shell of Melanella translucens (specimen at the Natural History Museum, Rotterdam)

Scientific classification
- Kingdom: Animalia
- Phylum: Mollusca
- Class: Gastropoda
- Subclass: Caenogastropoda
- Order: Littorinimorpha
- Superfamily: Vanikoroidea
- Family: Eulimidae
- Genus: Melanella
- Species: M. translucens

Binomial name
- Melanella translucens (Monterosato, 1890)

Synonyms
- Acicularia translucens Monterosato, 1890; Eulima transluscens (Monterosato, 1890)

Species of gastropod

Melanella translucens is a species of sea snail, a marine gastropod mollusk in the family Eulimidae.

== Description ==
The length of the shell attains 4.5 mm.

(Original description in Italian) The shell is a beautiful, straight, and slender form, as transparent as glass so that its internal structure can be seen through it ; it is taller, but narrower in proportion than Melanella lubrica.

== Distribution ==
This species occurs in the North Sea and the Mediterranean Sea. It is rare in muddy bottoms and is sometimes washed ashore on the beach
