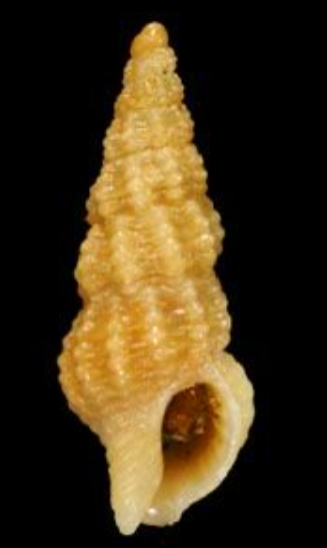
- Shell of Chauvetia procerula (specimen at the Natural History Museum, Rotterdam)

Scientific classification
- Kingdom: Animalia
- Phylum: Mollusca
- Class: Gastropoda
- Subclass: Caenogastropoda
- Order: Neogastropoda
- Family: Chauvetiidae
- Genus: Chauvetia
- Species: C. procerula

Binomial name
- Chauvetia procerula Monterosato, 1889

Synonyms
- Donovania procerula Monterosato, 1889

= Chauvetia procerula =

Species of gastropod

Chauvetia procerula is a species of sea snail, a marine gastropod mollusk in the family Chauvetiidae, the true whelks.

== Description ==
The length of the shell attains 8 mm.

== Distribution ==
This species occurs in the Mediterranean Sea off Italy, Spain and France; in the Strait of Gibraltar; in the Atlantic Ocean off Portugal, Morocco; and the Canary Islands.
