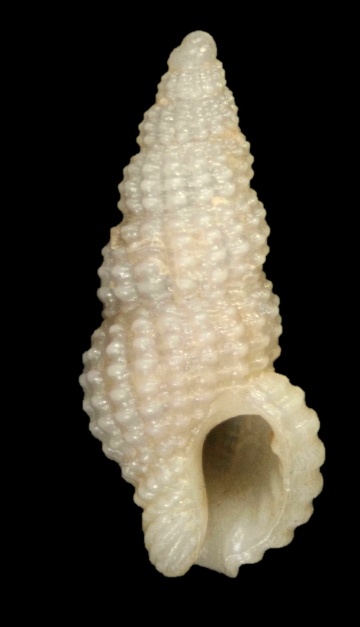
- Shell of Chauvetia candidissima (specimen at Naturalis Biodiversity Center)

Scientific classification
- Kingdom: Animalia
- Phylum: Mollusca
- Class: Gastropoda
- Subclass: Caenogastropoda
- Order: Neogastropoda
- Family: Chauvetiidae
- Genus: Chauvetia
- Species: C. candidissima

Binomial name
- Chauvetia candidissima (Philippi, 1836)

Synonyms
- Buccinum candidissimum R. A. Philippi, 1836 · superseded combination; Donovania candidissima (R. A. Philippi, 1836) superseded combination; Nassa rissoides Marrat, 1877

= Chauvetia candidissima =

Species of gastropod

Chauvetia candidissima is a species of sea snail, a marine gastropod mollusk in the family Chauvetiidae, the true whelks.

== Distribution ==
This species occurs in the Mediterranean Sea off Tunisia, in the Atlantic Ocean off Morocco.
