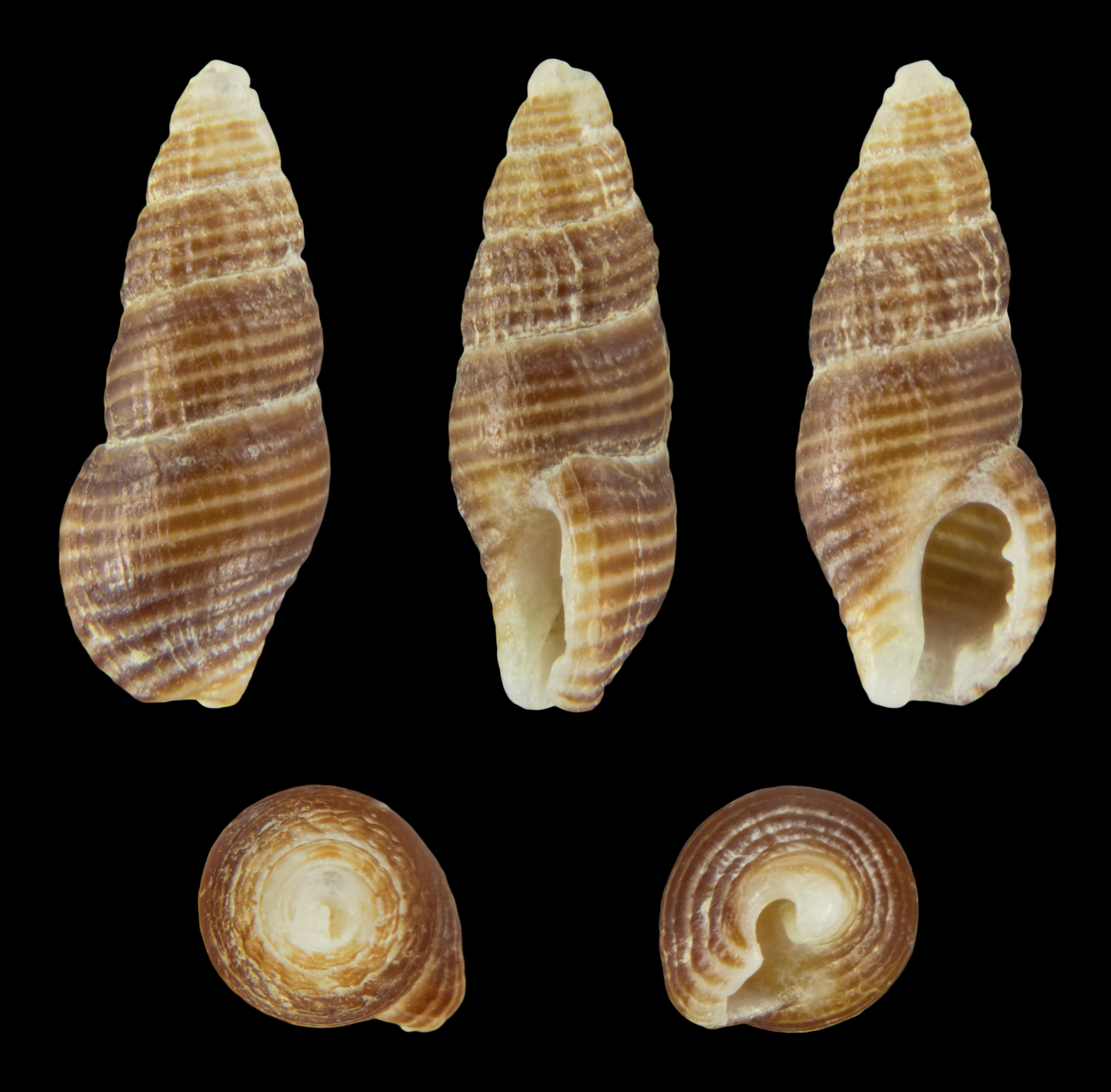

Scientific classification
- Kingdom: Animalia
- Phylum: Mollusca
- Class: Gastropoda
- Subclass: Caenogastropoda
- Order: Neogastropoda
- Family: Chauvetiidae
- Genus: Chauvetia
- Species: †C. retifera

Binomial name
- †Chauvetia retifera (Brugnone, 1880)

Synonyms
- Folinia retifera (Brugnone, 1880); † Lachesis retifera Brugnone, 1880

= Chauvetia retifera =

Species of gastropod

Chauvetia retifera is an extinct species of sea snail, a marine gastropod mollusk in the family Chauvetiidae, the true whelks.

Recent specimens from the Ibero-Moroccan area referred as C. retifera are to be referred to C. elongata Nordsieck & García Talavera, 1979

== Distribution ==
Fossils of this species were found in Pliocene strata in Sicily, Italy.
