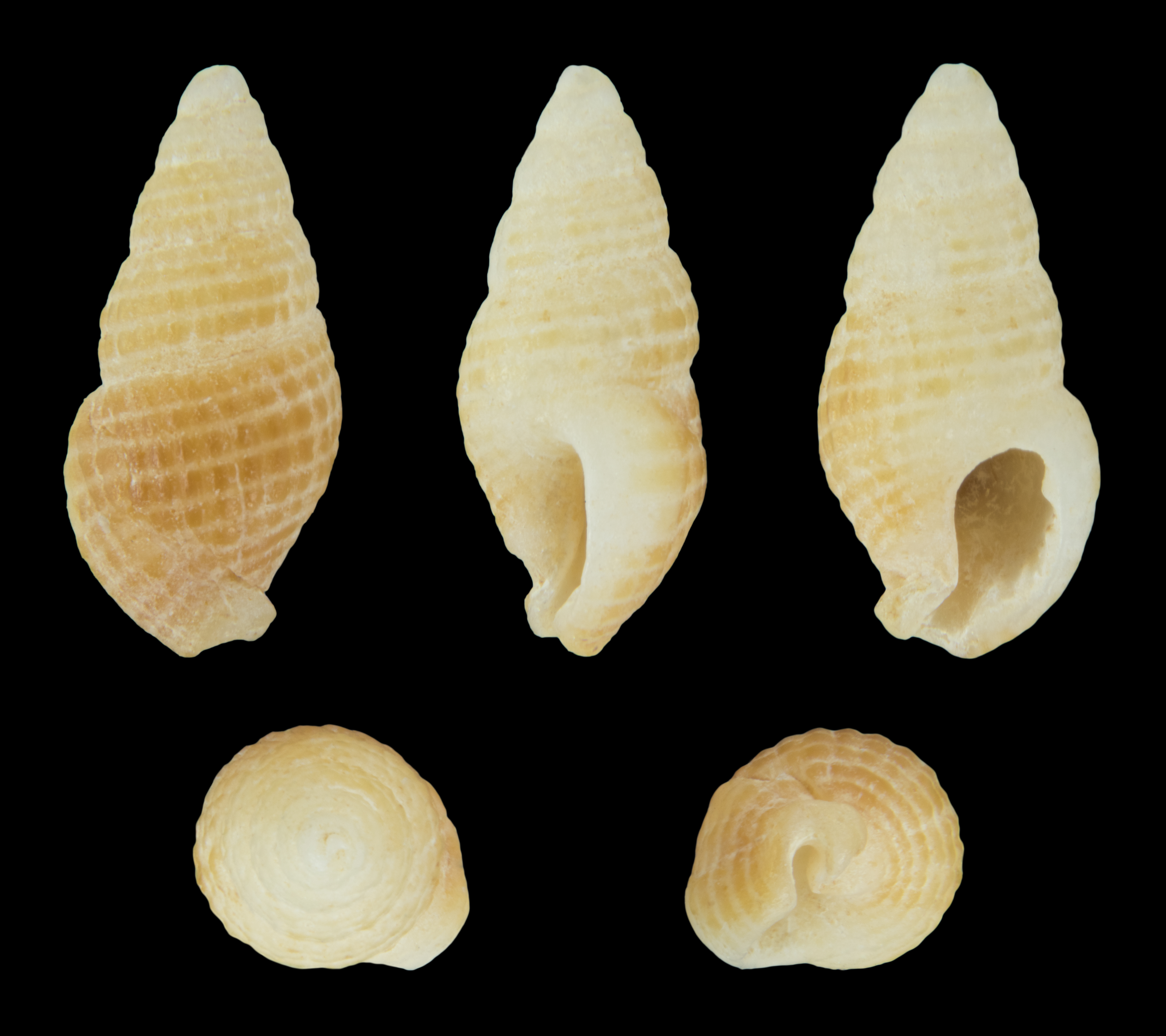

Scientific classification
- Kingdom: Animalia
- Phylum: Mollusca
- Class: Gastropoda
- Subclass: Caenogastropoda
- Order: Neogastropoda
- Family: Chauvetiidae
- Genus: Chauvetia
- Species: C. lefebvrii

Binomial name
- Chauvetia lefebvrii (Maravigna, 1840)

Synonyms
- Buccinum folineae (Delle Chiaje, 1828) sensu R. A. Philippi, 1844 misapplication; Buccinum lefebvrii Maravigna, 1840; Chauvetia lefebvrei (Maravigna, 1840) (misspelling); Donovania folineae (Delle Chiaje, 1828) sensu R. A. Philippi, 1844 misapplication; Fusus granulatus Calcara, 1839; Lachesis areolata Tiberi, 1868

= Chauvetia lefebvrii =

Species of gastropod

Chauvetia lefebvrii is a species of sea snail, a marine gastropod mollusk in the family Chauvetiidae, the true whelks.

== Description ==
The length of the shell attains 8 mm.

== Distribution ==
This species occurs in the Mediterranean Sea off Corsica, Malta and Sicily; in the Strait of Gibraltar; in the Ocean off Morocco.
