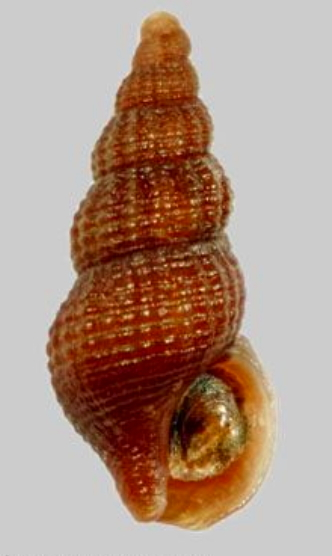
- Shell of Chauvetia bartolomeoi (specimen at the Natural History Museum, Rotterdam)

Scientific classification
- Kingdom: Animalia
- Phylum: Mollusca
- Class: Gastropoda
- Subclass: Caenogastropoda
- Order: Neogastropoda
- Family: Chauvetiidae
- Genus: Chauvetia
- Species: C. bartolomeoi

Binomial name
- Chauvetia bartolomeoi Ardovini, 2008

Synonyms
- Chauvetia javieri Oliver & Rolán, 2008

= Chauvetia bartolomeoi =

Species of gastropod

Chauvetia bartolomeoi is a species of sea snail, a marine gastropod mollusc in the family Chauvetiidae, the true whelks.

== Description ==
The length of the shell attains 7 mm.

== Distribution ==
This species occurs in the Atlantic Ocean off Morocco, Western Sahara and Mauretania.
