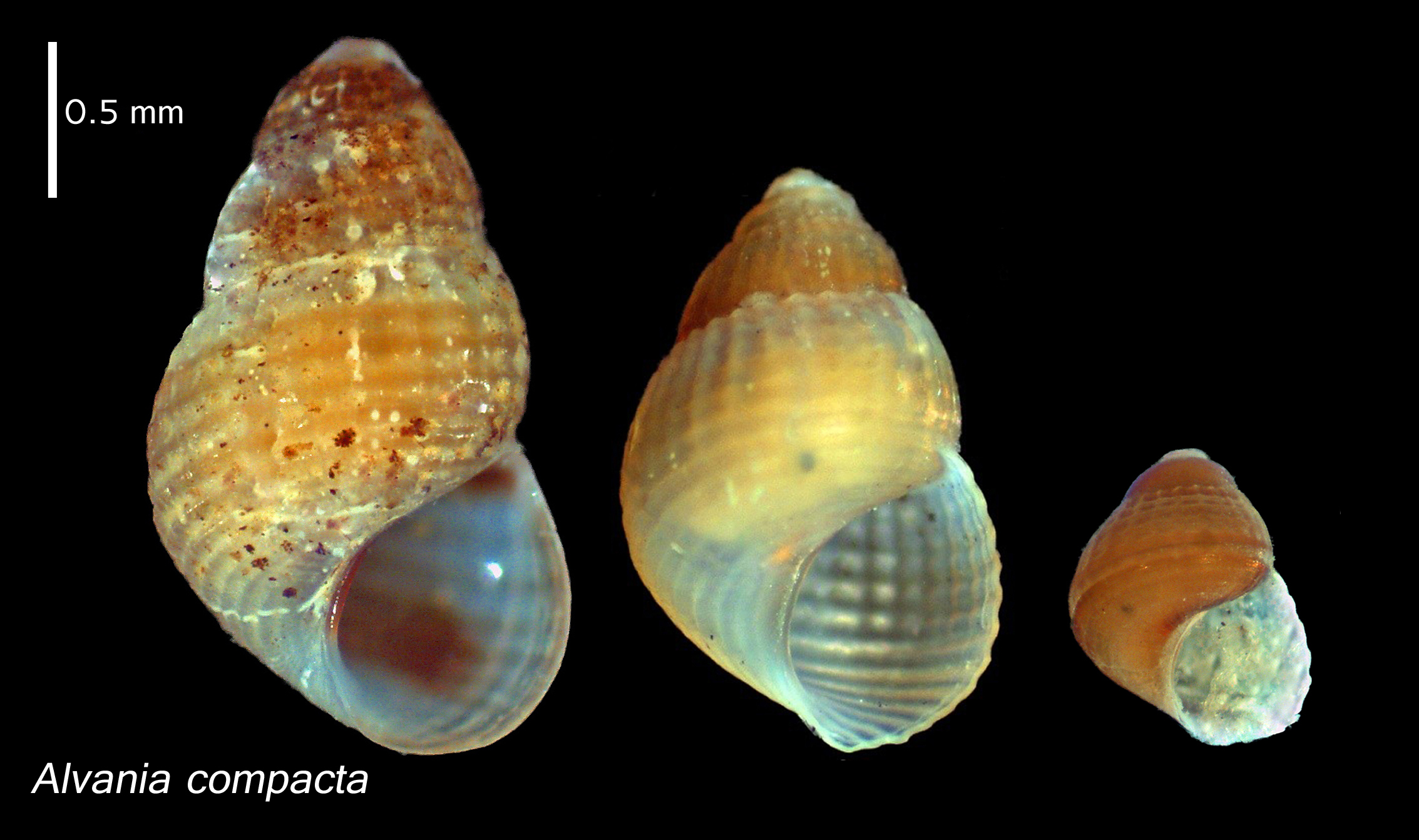
- Shell of Alvania compacta

Scientific classification
- Kingdom: Animalia
- Phylum: Mollusca
- Class: Gastropoda
- Subclass: Caenogastropoda
- Order: Littorinimorpha
- Superfamily: Rissooidea
- Family: Rissoidae
- Genus: Alvania
- Species: A. compacta

Binomial name
- Alvania compacta (P. P. Carpenter, 1864)

Synonyms
- Alvania acutelirata (P. P. Carpenter, 1864); Alvania filosa P. P. Carpenter, 1864; Alvania fossilis Bartsch, 1911; Alvania iliuliukensis Bartsch, 1911; Alvania pedroana Bartsch, 1911; Rissoa acutelirata P. P. Carpenter, 1864 (Basionym, taxon does not belong to Rissoa); Rissoa compacta P. P. Carpenter, 1864 superseded combination

= Alvania compacta =

Species of gastropod

Alvania compacta is a species of small sea snail, a marine gastropod mollusk or micromollusk in the family Rissoidae.

== Description ==
The length of the shell varies between 2 mm and 3 mm.

It is sculptured like Alvania beanii, but with short, broad whorls.

(Described as Rissoia acutelirata) The thin shell has a brownish ash-color. Its sculpture shows about 18 longitudinal, distant ribs, vanishing on the periphery, crossed by distant spiral lirae (15 on the body whorl). The shell is not nodose. It contains six convex whorls, rapidly enlarging, with a well-impressed suture.

== Distribution ==
This species occurs off Alaska, USA to Northern Baja California, Mexico
