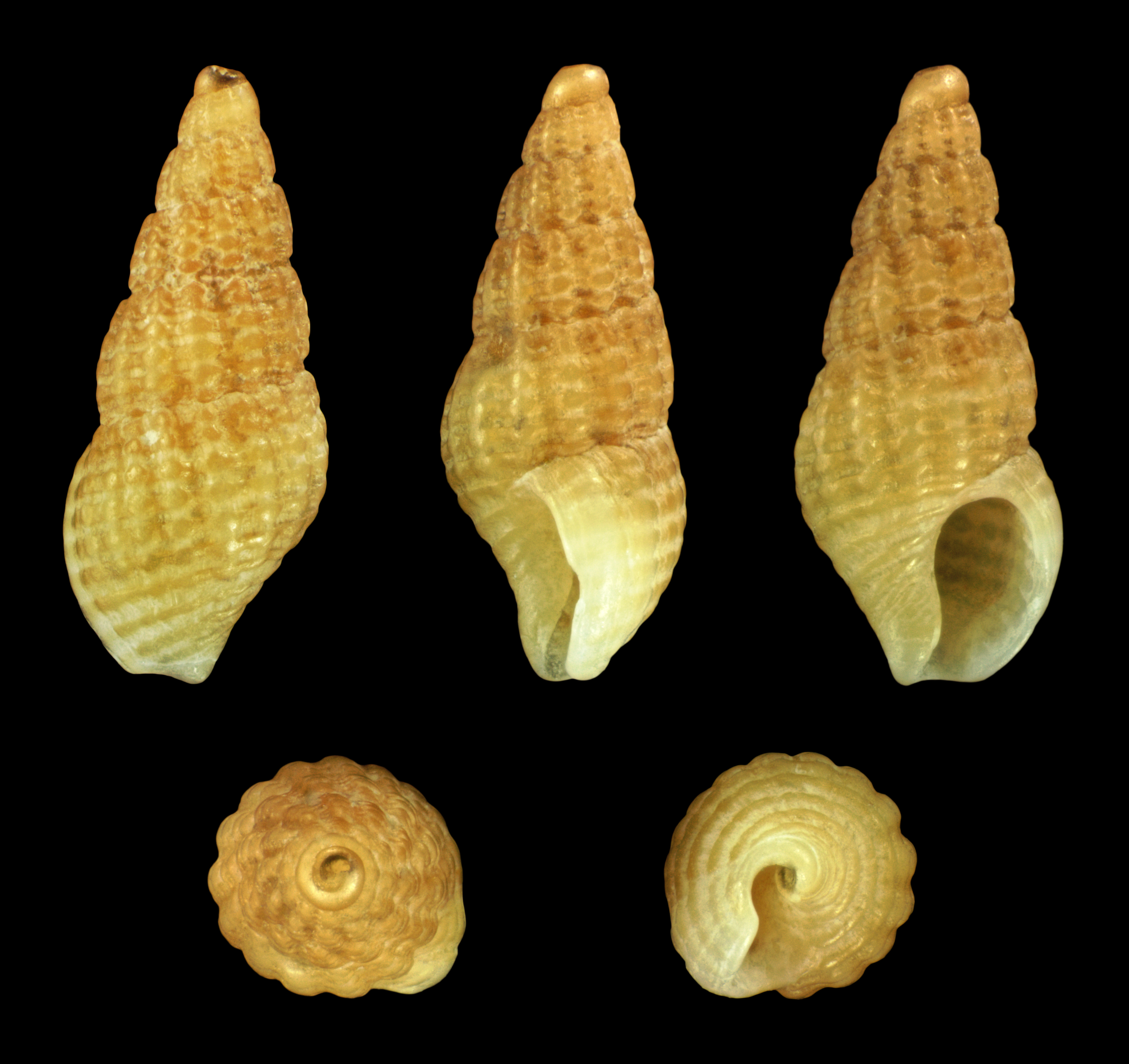

Scientific classification
- Kingdom: Animalia
- Phylum: Mollusca
- Class: Gastropoda
- Subclass: Caenogastropoda
- Order: Neogastropoda
- Family: Chauvetiidae
- Genus: Chauvetia
- Species: C. affinis

Binomial name
- Chauvetia affinis (Monterosato, 1889)

= Chauvetia affinis =

Species of gastropod

Chauvetia affinis is a species of sea snail, a marine gastropod mollusk in the family Chauvetiidae, the true whelks.
