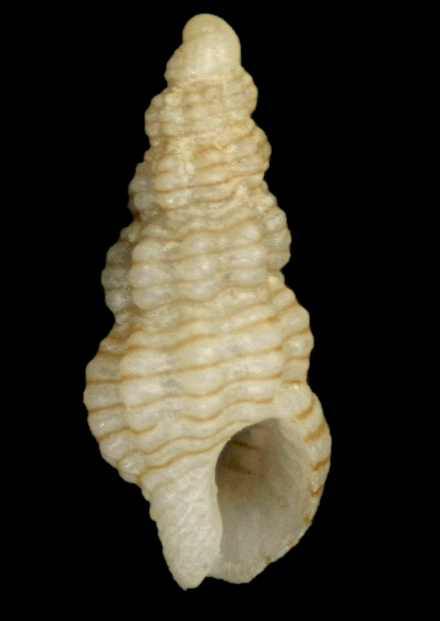
- Shell of Chauvetia giunchiorum (specimen at Naturalis Biodiversity Center)

Scientific classification
- Kingdom: Animalia
- Phylum: Mollusca
- Class: Gastropoda
- Subclass: Caenogastropoda
- Order: Neogastropoda
- Family: Chauvetiidae
- Genus: Chauvetia
- Species: C. giunchiorum

Binomial name
- Chauvetia giunchiorum (Micali, 1999)

= Chauvetia giunchiorum =

Species of gastropod

Chauvetia giunchiorum is a species of sea snail, a marine gastropod mollusk in the family Chauvetiidae, the true whelks.

== Distribution ==
This species occurs in the Mediterranean Sea off Italy.
