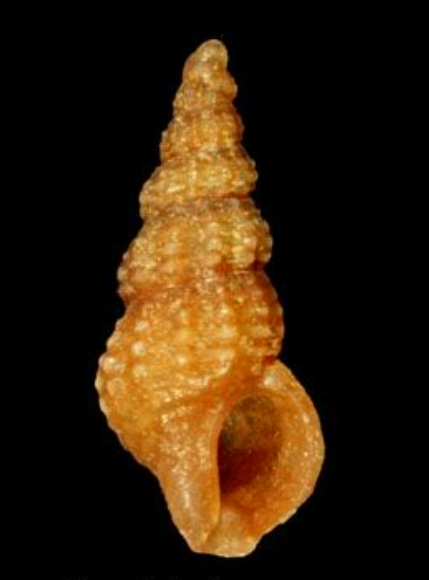
- Shell of Chauvetia joani (specimen at the Natural History Museum, Rotterdam)

Scientific classification
- Kingdom: Animalia
- Phylum: Mollusca
- Class: Gastropoda
- Subclass: Caenogastropoda
- Order: Neogastropoda
- Family: Chauvetiidae
- Genus: Chauvetia
- Species: C. joani

Binomial name
- Chauvetia joani Oliver & Rolan, 2008

= Chauvetia joani =

Species of gastropod

Chauvetia joani is a species of sea snail, a marine gastropod mollusc in the family Chauvetiidae, the true whelks.

== Description ==
The length of the shell attains 5.8 mm.

== Distribution ==
This species occurs in the Atlantic Ocean off Senegal.
