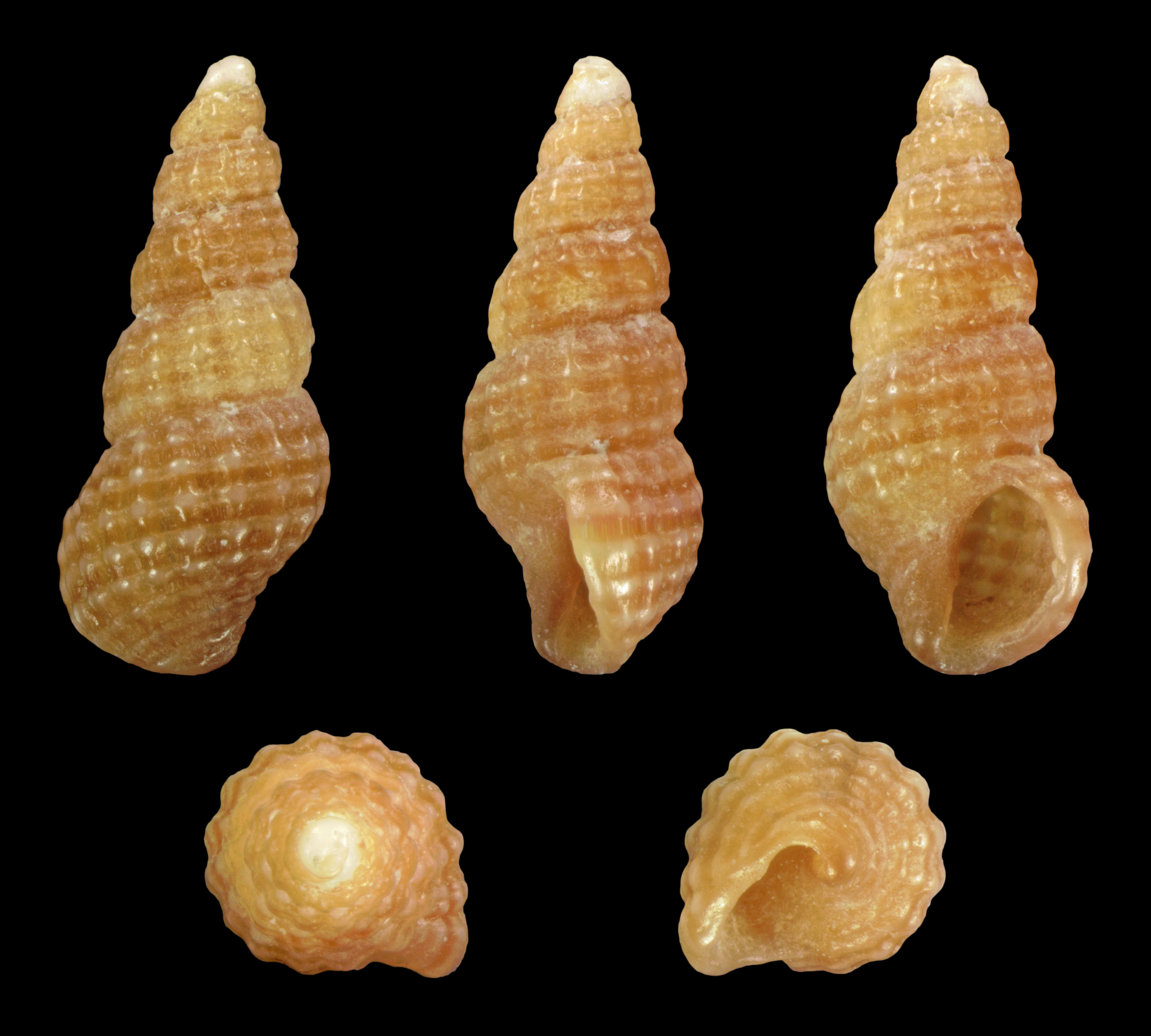

Scientific classification
- Kingdom: Animalia
- Phylum: Mollusca
- Class: Gastropoda
- Subclass: Caenogastropoda
- Order: Neogastropoda
- Family: Chauvetiidae
- Genus: Chauvetia
- Species: C. turritellata

Binomial name
- Chauvetia turritellata (Deshayes, 1835)

Synonyms
- Fusus turritellatus Deshayes, 1835

= Chauvetia turritellata =

Species of gastropod

Chauvetia turritellata is a species of sea snail, a marine gastropod mollusk in the family Chauvetiidae, commonly known as the true whelks.

== Distribution ==
This species occurs in the Mediterranean Sea.
