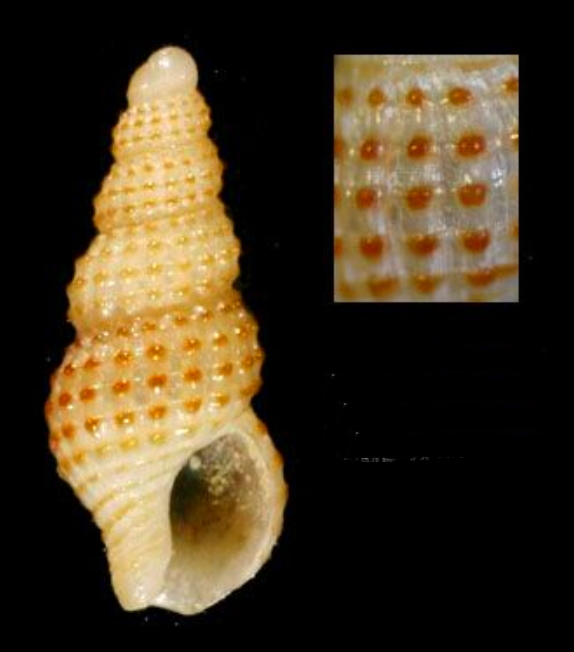
- Shell of Chauvetia ventrosa (specimen at the Natural History Museum, Rotterdam)

Scientific classification
- Kingdom: Animalia
- Phylum: Mollusca
- Class: Gastropoda
- Subclass: Caenogastropoda
- Order: Neogastropoda
- Family: Chauvetiidae
- Genus: Chauvetia
- Species: C. ventrosa

Binomial name
- Chauvetia ventrosa Nordsieck, 1976

= Chauvetia ventrosa =

Species of gastropod

Chauvetia ventrosa is a species of sea snail, a marine gastropod mollusk in the family Chauvetiidae, the true whelks.

== Distribution ==
This species occurs in the Mediterranean Sea off Italy.
