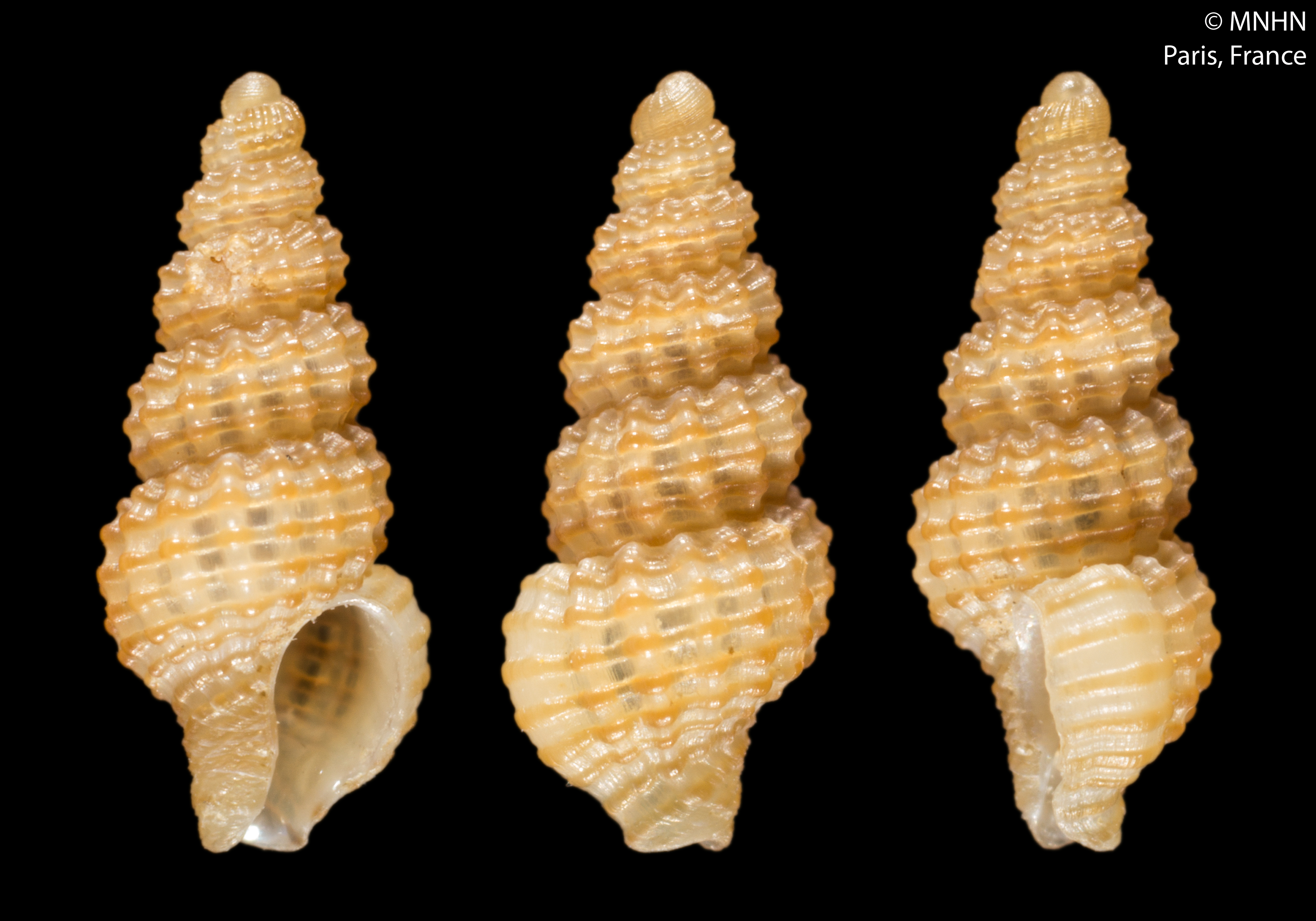
- Shell of Chauvetia recondita (syntype at MNHN, Paris)

Scientific classification
- Kingdom: Animalia
- Phylum: Mollusca
- Class: Gastropoda
- Subclass: Caenogastropoda
- Order: Neogastropoda
- Family: Chauvetiidae
- Genus: Chauvetia
- Species: C. recondita

Binomial name
- Chauvetia recondita (Brugnone, 1873)

Synonyms
- Chauvetia vulpecula (Monterosato, 1874); Chauvetia vulpecula attenuata F. Nordsieck, 1976; Lachesis recondita Brugnone, 1873; Lachesis vulpecula Monterosato, 1874

= Chauvetia recondita =

Species of gastropod

Chauvetia recondita is a species of sea snail, a marine gastropod mollusk in the family Chauvetiidae, the true whelks.

== Description ==
The length of the shell attains 5.3 mm, its diameter 2 mm.

(Original description in Latin) The shell is minute and turreted. It has 9 convex whorls that are latticed with vertical riblets and elevated transverse lines. The aperture is ovate, with a short tail. The siphonal canal is widely open. The outer lip is somewhat thickened and smooth on the inside, and the apex is obtuse (blunt).

The first whorl is smooth, while the others are cancellated (cross-hatched). The riblets and bands are nearly equal and are equally spaced from each other, latticing the surface precisely. At their intersection, they form granules.

On the body whorl, there are about 15 riblets that disappear toward the tail. On this same whorl, there are 10 bands, 5 of which are intersected by the riblets, and the others roughen the tail. On the remaining whorls, there are 3 bands.

== Distribution ==
This species occurs in the Mediterranean Sea off Sicily.
