= Cyrillia georgesi =

Scientific classification
- Kingdom: Animalia
- Phylum: Mollusca
- Class: Gastropoda
- Subclass: Caenogastropoda
- Order: Neogastropoda
- Superfamily: Conoidea
- Family: Raphitomidae
- Genus: Cyrillia
- Species: C. georgesi

Binomial name
- Cyrillia georgesi (Ceulemans, Van Dingenen & Landau, 2018)

Synonyms
- † Raphitoma georgesi Ceulemans, Van Dingenen & Landau, 2018 (original combination)

Extinct species of gastropod

Cyrillia georgesi is an extinct species of sea snail, a marine gastropod mollusc in the family Raphitomidae.

== Distribution ==
Fossils of this extinct marine species were found in Lower Pliocene strata in France.
