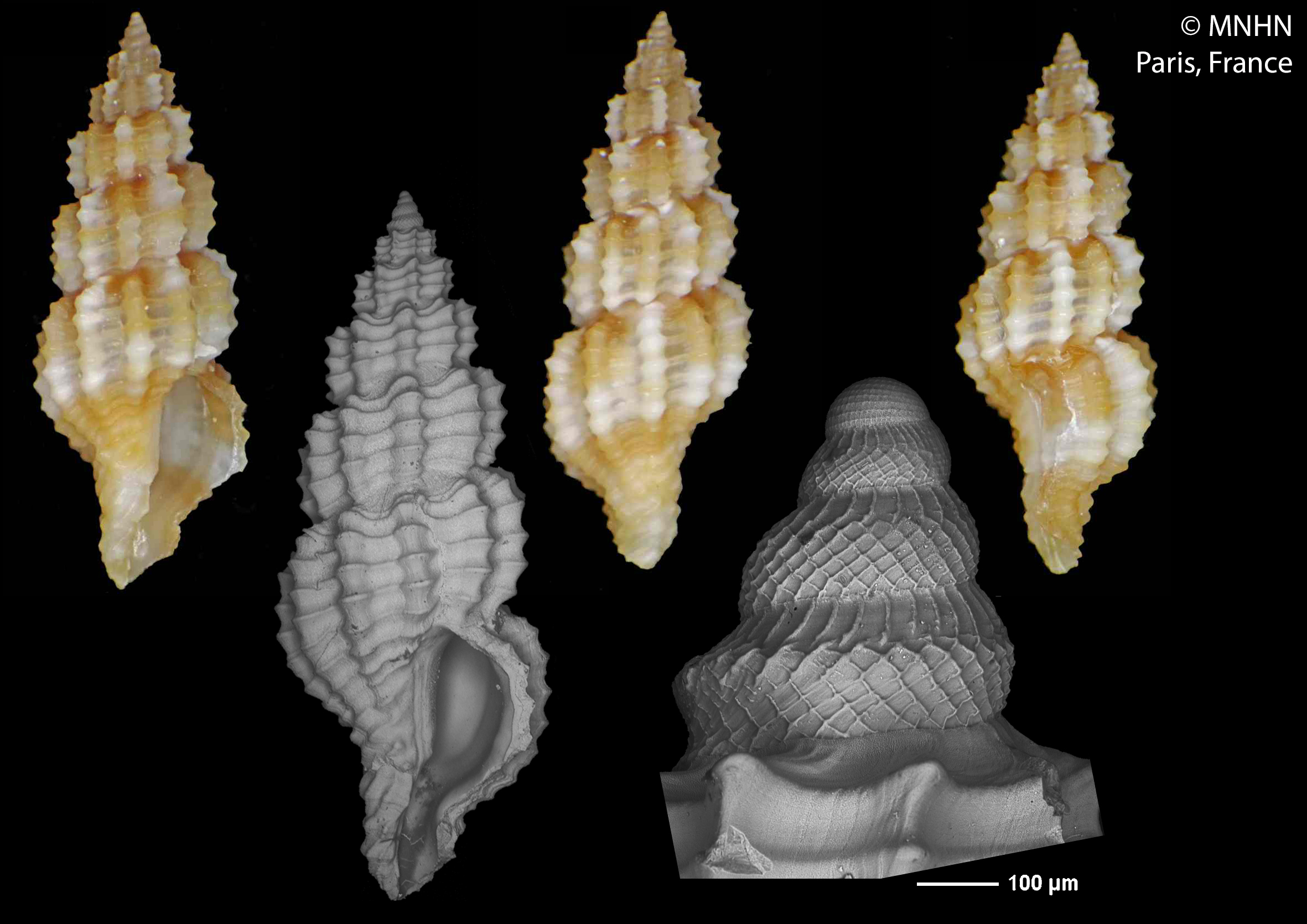
- Shell of Cyrillia zamponorum (holotype in MNHN? Paris)

Scientific classification
- Kingdom: Animalia
- Phylum: Mollusca
- Class: Gastropoda
- Subclass: Caenogastropoda
- Order: Neogastropoda
- Superfamily: Conoidea
- Family: Raphitomidae
- Genus: Cyrillia
- Species: C. zamponorum

Binomial name
- Cyrillia zamponorum (Horro, Gori & Rolán, 2019)

Synonyms
- Raphitoma zamponorum Horro, Rolán & Gori, 2019 (original combination)

= Cyrillia zamponorum =

Species of gastropod

Cyrillia zamponorum is a species of sea snail, a marine gastropod mollusk in the family Raphitomidae.

== Distribution ==
This marine species occurs in the Atlantic Ocean, the Gulf of Guinea off Sao Tome and Principe.
