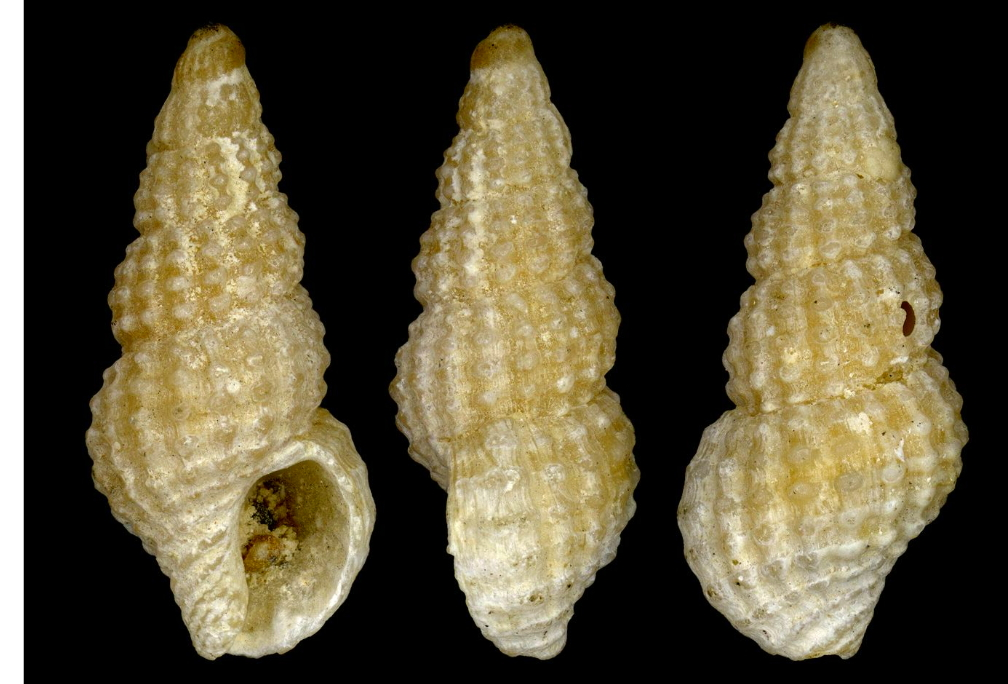
- Chauvetia brunnea shell (iconotype at MNHN, Paris)

Scientific classification
- Kingdom: Animalia
- Phylum: Mollusca
- Class: Gastropoda
- Subclass: Caenogastropoda
- Order: Neogastropoda
- Family: Chauvetiidae
- Genus: Chauvetia
- Species: C. brunnea

Binomial name
- Chauvetia brunnea (Donovan, 1804)

Synonyms
- Buccinum brunneum Donovan, 1804; Buccinum minimum Montagu, 1803; Buccinum rubrum Potiez & Michaud, 1838 (dubious synonym); Chauvetia (Donovaniella) minima (Montagu, 1803); Chauvetia (Donovaniella) minima fasciata F. Nordsieck, 1968; Chauvetia minima (Montagu, 1803); Chauvetia minima fasciata F. Nordsieck, 1968 ·; Donovania minima (Montagu, 1803); Fusus subnigeris T. Brown, 1827; Lachesis minima (Montagu, 1803) · unaccepted; Lachesis minima var. pallescens Jeffreys, 1867

= Chauvetia brunnea =

Species of gastropod

Chauvetia brunnea is a species of sea snail, a marine gastropod mollusk in the family Chauvetiidae, the true whelks.

== Distribution ==
This species occurs in the North Sea, the Mediterranean Sea and the Atlantic Ocean off Morocco.
