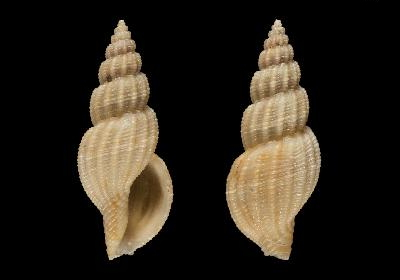
- Shell of Leufroyia villaria (specimen at MNHN, Paris)

Scientific classification
- Kingdom: Animalia
- Phylum: Mollusca
- Class: Gastropoda
- Subclass: Caenogastropoda
- Order: Neogastropoda
- Superfamily: Conoidea
- Family: Raphitomidae
- Genus: Leufroyia; Monterosato, 1884

Type species
- Pleurotoma leufroyi Michaud, 1828

Species
- See text

Synonyms
- Raphitoma (Leufroyia) Monterosato, 1884

= Leufroyia =

Genus of gastropods

Leufroyia is a genus of sea snails, marine gastropod mollusks in the family Raphitomidae.

== Description ==
(Original description) This is a distinct group with swollen whorls. The axial ribs and the spirally striate riblets form a reticulate structure. The shell is internally smoothed. The aperture is smooth, without denticles or grooves.

== Species ==
Species within the genus Leufroyia include:

- † Leufroyia aldrovandi (Millet, 1865)
- † Leufroyia alternata (Millet, 1865)
- † Leufroyia annegienae Landau, Van Dingenen & Ceulemans, 2020
- Leufroyia concinna (Scacchi, 1836)
- † Leufroyia conspicua (Eichwald, 1830)
- † Leufroyia desmoulinsi (Bellardi, 1847)
- Leufroyia erronea Monterosato, 1884
- † Leufroyia ferrierii Brunetti & Della Bella, 2006
- † Leufroyia gradata Landau, Harzhauser & Giannuzzi-Savelli, 2022
- † Leufroyia hesseli Landau, Van Dingenen & Ceulemans, 2020
- † Leufroyia inflata (De Cristofori & Jan, 1832)
- † Leufroyia landreauensis (Ceulemans, Van Dingenen & Landau, 2018)
- Leufroyia leufroyi (Michaud, 1828)
- † Leufroyia ligeriana Landau, Van Dingenen & Ceulemans, 2020
- † Leufroyia montagui (Bellardi, 1877) †
- † Leufroyia pseudoconcinna (Ceulemans, Van Dingenen & Landau, 2018)
- † Leufroyia pseudoleufroyi (Marquet, 1998)
- † Leufroyia renauleauensis Landau, Van Dingenen & Ceulemans, 2020
- † Leufroyia riccardoi Landau, Van Dingenen & Ceulemans, 2020
- † Leufroyia seani Landau, Van Dingenen & Ceulemans, 2020
- † Leufroyia stria (Calcara, 1839)
- † Leufroyia turtaudierei (Ceulemans, Van Dingenen & Landau, 2018)
- Leufroyia villaria (Pusateri & Giannuzzi-Savelli, 2008)
- † Leufroyia volutella (Kiener, 1839)
