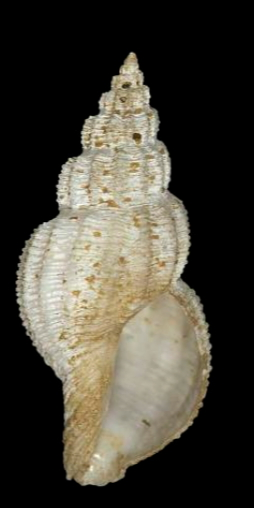
- Shell of Leufroyia erronea (specimen at the Smithsonian Institution)

Scientific classification
- Kingdom: Animalia
- Phylum: Mollusca
- Class: Gastropoda
- Subclass: Caenogastropoda
- Order: Neogastropoda
- Superfamily: Conoidea
- Family: Raphitomidae
- Genus: Leufroyia
- Species: L. erronea

Binomial name
- Leufroyia erronea Monterosato, 1884

Synonyms
- Raphitoma erronea (Monterosato, 1884); Raphitoma (Leufroyia) leufroyi (Michaud, 1828)

= Leufroyia erronea =

Species of gastropod

Leufroyia erronea is a species of sea snail, a marine gastropod mollusk belonging to the family Raphitomidae.

== Distribution ==
Entire Mediterranean and NE Atlantic from Scotland to Canary Islands.
