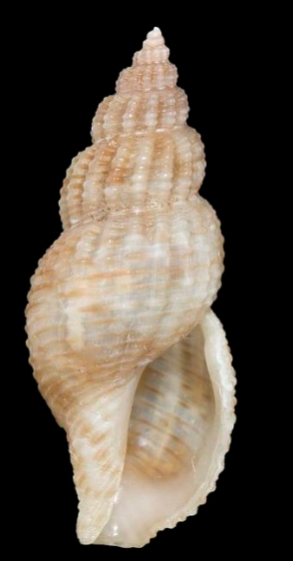
- Shell of Leufroyia concinna (specimen at the Smithsonian Institution)

Scientific classification
- Kingdom: Animalia
- Phylum: Mollusca
- Class: Gastropoda
- Subclass: Caenogastropoda
- Order: Neogastropoda
- Superfamily: Conoidea
- Family: Raphitomidae
- Genus: Leufroyia
- Species: L. concinna

Binomial name
- Leufroyia concinna (Scacchi, 1836)

Synonyms
- Fusus boothii J. Smith, 1839; Leufroyia boothii Smith, 1839; Philbertia concinna (Scacchi, 1836); Pleurotoma concinna Scacchi, 1836 (basionym); Raphitoma (Leufroyia) boothii (J. Smith, 1839); Raphitoma (Leufroyia) concinna (Scacchi, 1836)· accepted, alternate representation; Raphitoma (Leufroyia) scacchii De Casa & Hallgass, 1979; Raphitoma boothii Smith, 1839; Raphitoma concinna (Scacchi, 1836); Raphitoma concinna Monterosato, 1877; Raphitoma concinna Locard & Caziot, 1900; Raphitoma scacchii De Casa & Hallgass, 1979

= Leufroyia concinna =

Species of gastropod

Leufroyia concinna is a species of sea snail, a marine gastropod mollusk in the family Raphitomidae.

== Subspecies ==
- Leufroyia concinna maderensis (F. Nordsieck & F.F. Talavera, 1979) (synonym: Raphitoma concinna maderensis F. Nordsieck & F.F. Talavera, 1979 )

== Description ==
The shell can grow to a length of 13 mm and a diameter of 6 mm. Generally, the color of shell is cream, white, light brown, or a mix of the previous colors.

== Distribution ==
This species occurs in most European waters and is found in the entirety of the Mediterranean Sea. It can also be found in the more northeastern waters of the Atlantic Ocean, off the Azores up Norway and south up to Canary Islands.
