= Cyrillia obesa =

Scientific classification
- Kingdom: Animalia
- Phylum: Mollusca
- Class: Gastropoda
- Subclass: Caenogastropoda
- Order: Neogastropoda
- Superfamily: Conoidea
- Family: Raphitomidae
- Genus: Cyrillia
- Species: C. obesa

Binomial name
- Cyrillia obesa (Høisæter, 2016)

Synonyms
- Raphitoma obesa Høisæter, 2016 (original combination)

Species of gastropod

Cyrillia obesa is a species of sea snail, a marine gastropod mollusk in the family Raphitomidae.

== Distribution ==
This marine species occurs in the Atlantic Ocean off Norway.
