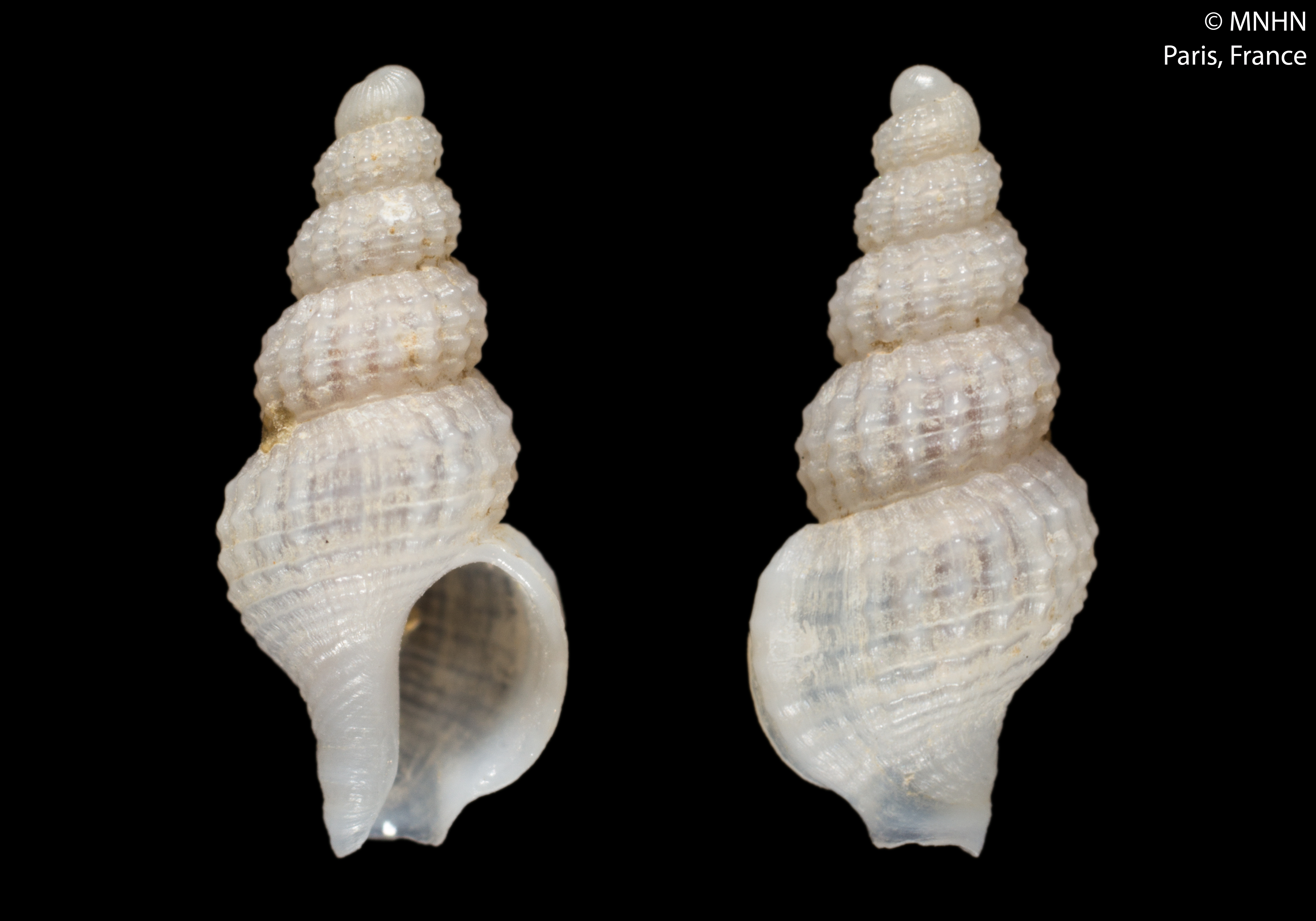
- Shell of Chauvetia balgimae (holotype at MNHN, Paris)

Scientific classification
- Kingdom: Animalia
- Phylum: Mollusca
- Class: Gastropoda
- Subclass: Caenogastropoda
- Order: Neogastropoda
- Superfamily: Buccinoidea
- Family: Chauvetiidae
- Genus: Chauvetia; Monterosato, 1884

Type species
- Chauvetia mamillata (Risso, 1826)

Synonyms
- Chauvetia (Donovaniella) F. Nordsieck, 1968; Chauvetiella F. Nordsieck, 1968; Donovania Bucquoy, Dautzenberg & Dollfus, 1883 (invalid: junior homonym of Donovania Leach, 1814 [Crustacea]; Chauvetia and Syntagma are replacement names); Donovania (Adansonia) Pallary, 1902 (invalid: unnecessary nom. nov. pro Folineaea Monterosato, 1884, by Pallary treated as a junior homonym of Folinia Crosse, 1868); Donovaniella F. Nordsieck, 1968; Folineaea Monterosato, 1884; Folinia [sic] (misspelling of Folinaea Monterosato, 1884; non Folinia Crosse, 1868); Lachesis Risso, 1826 (invalid: junior homonym of Lachesis Daudin, 1803 [Reptilia]; Donovania and Syntagma are replacement names); Nesaea Risso, 1826 (invalid: junior homonym of Nesaea Leach, 1814 [Crustacea]; Donovania and Chauvetia are replacement names); Pleurotoma (Lachesis) Risso, 1826; Syntagma Iredale, 1918

= Chauvetia =

Genus of gastropods

Chauvetia is a genus of sea snails, marine gastropod mollusks in the family Chauvetiidae, the true whelks.

== Description ==
The strong shell is turreted and many-whorled. The body whorl is not very large. The surface is crossed by longitudinal ribs and transverse striae. The apex of the spire is mammillated. The aperture is oval. The siphonal canal is very short, straight and not recurved. The outer lip is slightly thickened and crenated internally.

== Species ==
Species within the genus Chauvetia include:

- Chauvetia affinis (Monterosato, 1889)
- Chauvetia austera Oliver & Rolán, 2009
- Chauvetia balgimae Gofas & Oliver, 2010
- Chauvetia bartolomeoi Ardovini, 2008
- Chauvetia borgesi Oliver & Rolán, 2009
- † Chauvetia brunettii Landau & Micali, 2023
- Chauvetia brunnea (Donovan, 1804)
- Chauvetia candidissima (Philippi, 1836)
- † Chauvetia chirlii Brunetti, Della Bella & Cresti, 2017
- † Chauvetia costulata (G. Seguenza, 1880)
- Chauvetia crassior (Odhner, 1932)
- Chauvetia decorata Monterosato, 1889
- Chauvetia dentifera Gofas & Oliver, 2010
- Chauvetia distans Oliver & Rolán, 2009
- Chauvetia edentula Oliver & Rolán, 2009
- Chauvetia elongata F. Nordsieck & García-Talavera, 1979
- Chauvetia errata Oliver & Rolán, 2009
- † Chauvetia fenestrata Landau & Micali, 2023 †
- † Chauvetia fortiornata Landau & Micali, 2023 †
- Chauvetia gigantea Oliver & Rolan, 2008
- Chauvetia gigantissina Oliver & Rolán, 2009
- Chauvetia giunchiorum (Micali, 1999)
- Chauvetia hernandezi Oliver & Rolán, 2009
- † Chauvetia hoffmani Landau & Micali, 2023
- † Chauvetia inopinata Landau, C. M. Silva & Vermeij, 2015
- † Chauvetia janseni Landau & Micali, 2023
- Chauvetia joani Oliver & Rolan, 2008
- Chauvetia lamyi Knudsen, 1956
- Chauvetia lefebvrii (Maravigna, 1840)
- Chauvetia lineolata (Tiberi, 1868)
- Chauvetia luciacuestae Oliver & Rolan, 2008
- Chauvetia mamillata (Risso, 1826)
- Chauvetia maroccana Gofas & Oliver, 2010
- Chauvetia mauritania Hoffman, Fraussen & Freiwald, 2018
- Chauvetia megastoma Oliver & Rolán, 2009
- Chauvetia merianae Hoffman, Fraussen & Freiwald, 2018
- Chauvetia multilirata Oliver & Rolan, 2008
- † Chauvetia obesa Landau & Micali, 2023
- Chauvetia obliqua Nordsieck & Talavera, 1979: (nomen dubium)
- †Chauvetia oliveri Landau & Micali, 2023
- Chauvetia pardacuta Oliver & Rolan, 2008
- Chauvetia pardofasciata Oliver & Rolan, 2008
- Chauvetia peculiaris Oliver & Rolán, 2009
- Chauvetia pelorcei Oliver & Rolan, 2008
- † Chauvetia plioetrusca Brunetti, Della Bella & Cresti, 2017
- † Chauvetia pliorobusta Brunetti, Della Bella & Cresti, 2017
- Chauvetia poseidonae Hoffman, Fraussen & Freiwald, 2018
- Chauvetia procerula Monterosato, 1889
- † Chauvetia pseudopelorcei Landau & Micali, 2023
- Chauvetia recondita (Brugnone, 1873)
- Chauvetia retifera (Brugnone, 1880)
- Chauvetia robustalba Oliver & Rolan, 2008
- † Chauvetia sinuosa Landau & Micali, 2023
- † Chauvetia solida Landau & Micali, 2023
- Chauvetia soni (Bruguière, 1789)
- † Chauvetia sossoi Brunetti, Della Bella & Cresti, 2017
- † Chauvetia spinosa Landau & Micali, 2023
- Chauvetia taeniata Gofas & Oliver, 2010
- Chauvetia tenebrosa Oliver & Rolan, 2008
- Chauvetia tenuisculpta (Dautzenberg, 1891)
- † Chauvetia turqueti (C. Vélain, 1876)
- Chauvetia turritellata (Deshayes, 1835)
- Chauvetia ventrosa Nordsieck, 1976

Species brought into synonymy

- Chauvetia javieri Oliver & Rolan, 2008: synonym of Chauvetia bartolomeoi
- Chauvetia lefebvrei (Maravigna, 1840): synonym of Chauvetia lefebvrii (Maravigna, 1840) (misspelling)
- Chauvetia minima (Montagu, 1803): synonym of Chauvetia brunnea (Donovan, 1804)
- Chauvetia pellisphocae (Reeve, 1845) sensu Pallary, 1920: synonym of Chauvetia retifera (Brugnone, 1880) † (misidentification by Pallary (1920) and other European authors)
- Chauvetia submamillata (Bucquoy, Dautzenberg & Dollfus, 1882): synonym of Chauvetia mamillata
- Chauvetia vulpecula (Monterosato, 1874): synonym of Chauvetia recondita (Brugnone, 1873)
