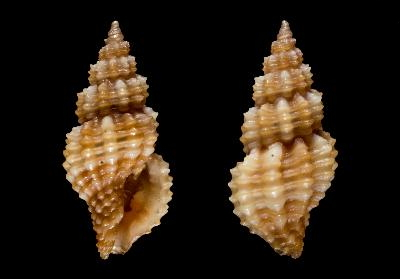
- Shell of Cyrillia ephesina (holotype at MNHN Paris)

Scientific classification
- Kingdom: Animalia
- Phylum: Mollusca
- Class: Gastropoda
- Subclass: Caenogastropoda
- Order: Neogastropoda
- Superfamily: Conoidea
- Family: Raphitomidae
- Genus: Cyrillia; Kobelt, 1905

Type species
- Murex linearis Montagu, 1803

Species
- See text

Synonyms
- Cenodagreutes E. H. Smith, 1967; Cordieria (Cirillia) Monterosato, 1884 (invalid: junior homonym of Cirillia Rondani, 1856 [Diptera]; Cyrillia is an emendation and Lineotoma is a replacement name); Lineotoma F. Nordsieck, 1977

= Cyrillia =

Genus of gastropods

Cyrillia is a genus of sea snails, marine gastropod mollusks in the family Raphitomidae.

== Description ==
The shells are rather small (5 to 10 mm), showing a reticulate structure. The aperture is piriform. The outer lip is slightly crenulate, within incrassate and distinctly denticulate.

== Species ==
- Cyrillia aequalis (Jeffreys, 1867)
- Cyrillia ephesina (Pusateri, Giannuzzi-Savelli & Stahlschmidt, 2017)
- † Cyrillia georgesi (Ceulemans, Van Dingenen & Landau, 2018)
- Cyrillia kabuli (Rolán, Otero-Schmitt & F. Fernandes, 1998)
- Cyrillia linearis (Montagu, 1803)
- † Cyrillia michalidesi Landau, Van Dingenen & Ceulemans, 2020
- Cyrillia obesa (Høisæter, 2016)
- Cyrillia zamponorum (Horro, Gori & Rolán, 2019)
