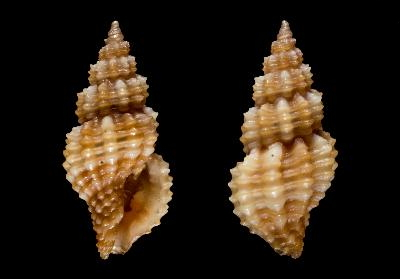
- Shell of Cyrillia ephesina (holotype at MNHN, Paris)

Scientific classification
- Kingdom: Animalia
- Phylum: Mollusca
- Class: Gastropoda
- Subclass: Caenogastropoda
- Order: Neogastropoda
- Superfamily: Conoidea
- Family: Raphitomidae
- Genus: Cyrillia
- Species: C. ephesina

Binomial name
- Cyrillia ephesina (Pusateri, Giannuzzi-Savelli & Stahlschmidt, 2017)

Synonyms
- Raphitoma ephesina Pusateri, Giannuzzi Savelli & Stahlschmidt, 2017 (original combination)

= Cyrillia ephesina =

Species of gastropod

Cyrillia ephesina is a species of sea snail, a marine gastropod mollusk in the family Raphitomidae.

== Description ==
The length of the shell varies between 5.8 mm and 7.5 mm. The shell body is dextrally coiled (right-handed).

== Distribution ==
This marine species occurs widely in the Mediterranean Sea (France, Croatia, Greece, Italy) and in the Aegean Sea. They can be found living along the seafloor, shores, tidal areas, marine coral reefs, and the deep seabed.
