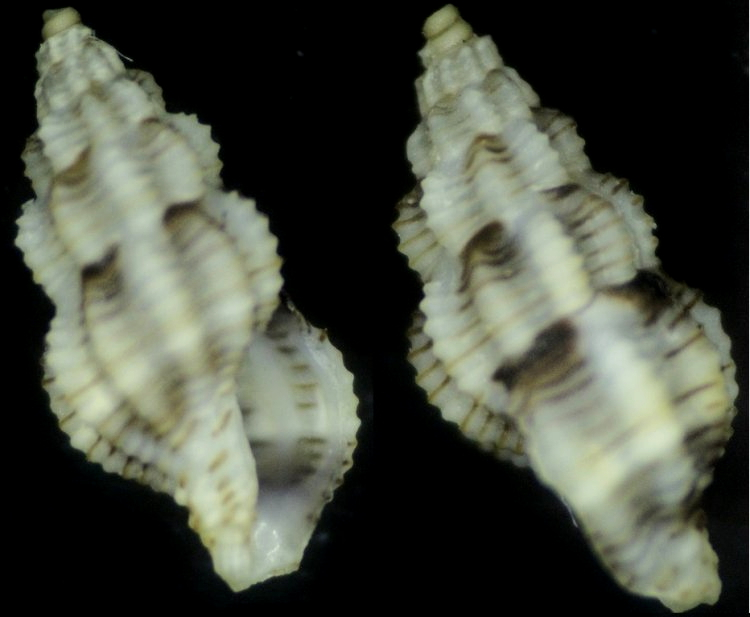
- Shell of Cyrillia aequalis

Scientific classification
- Kingdom: Animalia
- Phylum: Mollusca
- Class: Gastropoda
- Subclass: Caenogastropoda
- Order: Neogastropoda
- Superfamily: Conoidea
- Family: Raphitomidae
- Genus: Cyrillia
- Species: C. aequalis

Binomial name
- Cyrillia aequalis (Jeffreys, 1867)

Synonyms
- Cenodagreutes aethus E. H. Smith, 1967; Defrancia aequalis Jeffreys, 1867; Defrancia linearis var. aequalis Jeffreys, 1867; Mangelia linearis var. intermedia Forbes & Hanley, 1853; Raphitoma aequalis (Jeffreys, 1867); Raphitoma linearis aequalis (Jeffreys, 1867)

= Cyrillia aequalis =

Species of gastropod

Cyrillia aequalis is a species of sea snail, a marine gastropod mollusk in the family Raphitomidae.

== Description ==
The length of the shell varies between 5 mm and 10 mm.

== Distribution ==
This marine species occurs from Norway to the Western Mediterranean.
