= Cyrillia kabuli =

Scientific classification
- Kingdom: Animalia
- Phylum: Mollusca
- Class: Gastropoda
- Subclass: Caenogastropoda
- Order: Neogastropoda
- Superfamily: Conoidea
- Family: Raphitomidae
- Genus: Cyrillia
- Species: C. kabuli

Binomial name
- Cyrillia kabuli (Rolán, Otero-Schmitt & F. Fernandes, 1998)

Synonyms
- Raphitoma kabuli Rolán, Otero-Schmitt & F. Fernandes, 1998 (original combination)

Species of gastropod

Cyrillia kabuli is a species of sea snail, a marine gastropod mollusk in the family Raphitomidae.

== Description ==
The length of the shell varies between 4 mm and 6 mm.

== Distribution ==
This marine species occurs off Angola.
