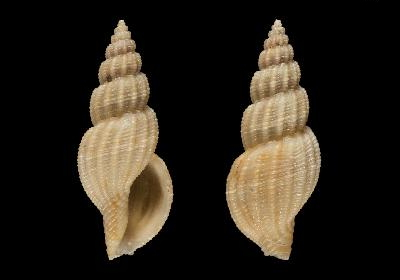
- Shell of Leufroyia villaria (specimen at MNHN, Paris)

Scientific classification
- Kingdom: Animalia
- Phylum: Mollusca
- Class: Gastropoda
- Subclass: Caenogastropoda
- Order: Neogastropoda
- Superfamily: Conoidea
- Family: Raphitomidae
- Genus: Leufroyia
- Species: L. villaria

Binomial name
- Leufroyia villaria (Pusateri & Giannuzzi-Savelli, 2008)

Synonyms
- Raphitoma villaria Pusateri & Giannuzzi-Savelli, 2008 (original combination)

= Leufroyia villaria =

Species of gastropod

Leufroyia villaria is a species of sea snail, a marine gastropod mollusk in the family Raphitomidae.

== Description ==
The length of the shell attains 17.3 mm.

== Distribution ==
This species occurs in the Mediterranean Sea off Sicily.
