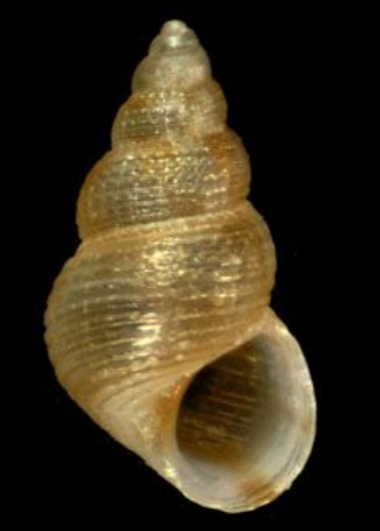
- Shell of Alvania punctura (specimen at the Natural History Museum, Rotterdam)

Scientific classification
- Kingdom: Animalia
- Phylum: Mollusca
- Class: Gastropoda
- Subclass: Caenogastropoda
- Order: Littorinimorpha
- Superfamily: Rissooidea
- Family: Rissoidae
- Genus: Alvania
- Species: A. punctura

Binomial name
- Alvania punctura (Montagu, 1803)

Synonyms
- Alvania puncturata Locard, 1886 (unjustified emendation); Arsenia punctura (Montagu, 1803) superseded combination; Alvania (Arsenia) punctura Montagu, 1803; Rissoa punctura (Montagu, 1803); Rissoa punctura var. diversa Jeffreys, 1867 ·; Turbo punctura Montagu, 1803; Turritella dorvilleana Leach, 1852 junior subjective synonym

= Alvania punctura =

Species of gastropod

Alvania punctura is a species of small sea snail, a marine gastropod mollusk or micromollusk in the family Rissoidae.

== Description ==
The length of the shell attains 3 mm.

(Original description) The very glossy shell has rounded whorls, rather taper in shape, and finely reticulated. The colour of the shell is transparent yellowish-white. The aperture is sub-orbicular and has a thin lip. The ridges on the body whorl do not extend over the outer lip. The shell has a small umbilical chink. The length of the shell is the tenth of an inch. Its breadth one third its length.

== Distribution ==
This species occurs in the Eastern Atlantic, from Norway to the Strait of Gibraltar; intertidal to ca. 100 m depth; rare and rather local in the Western Mediterranean (Corsica, Greece) in 50-200 m. Gorringe Ridge and Ampère Seamount, rare in 265-320 m. It is absent from Baltic Sea and the eastern basin of the English Channel.

Fossils have been found in Pleistocene strata on Sicily, Italy.
