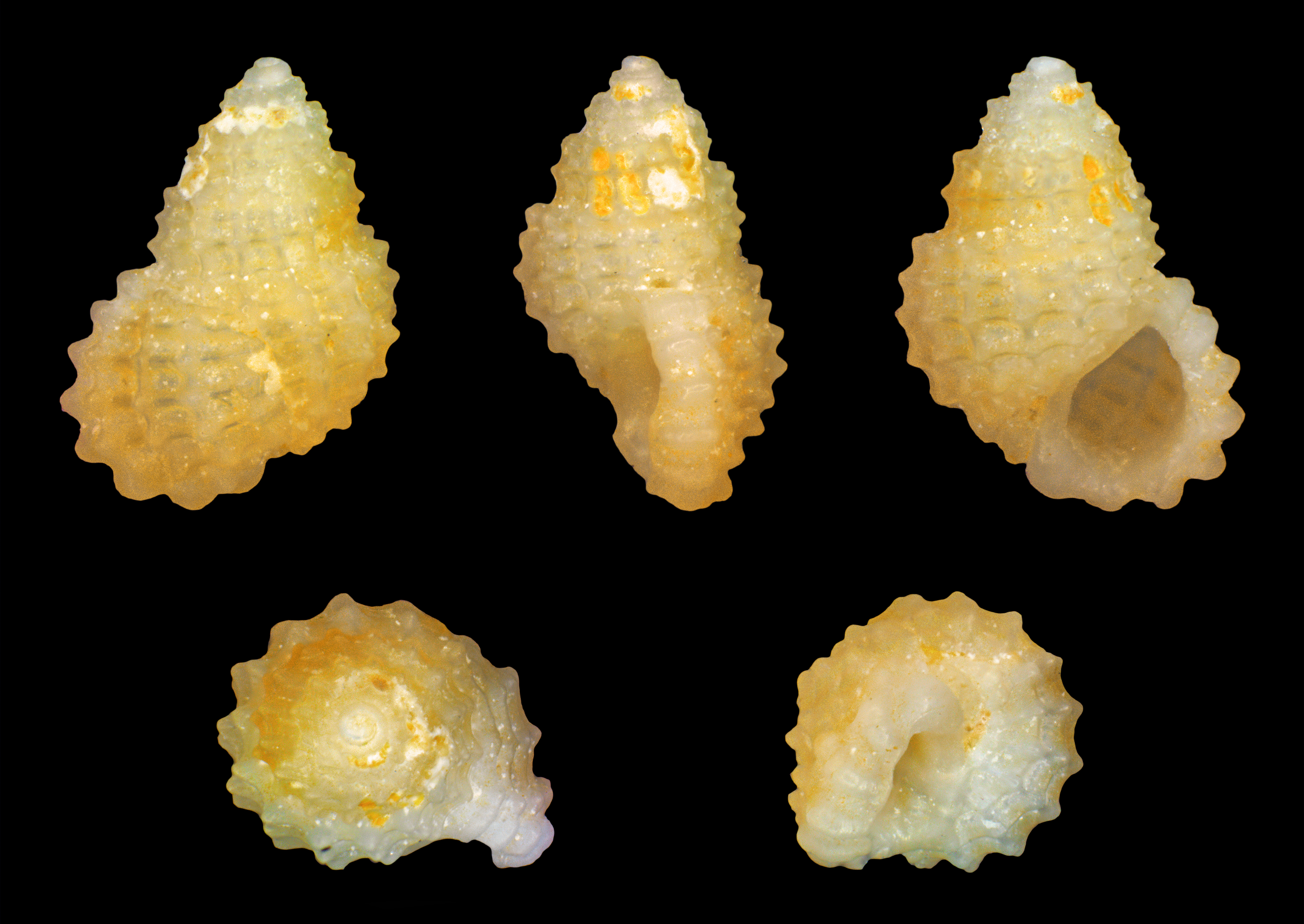
- Shell of Alvania cancellata

Scientific classification
- Kingdom: Animalia
- Phylum: Mollusca
- Class: Gastropoda
- Subclass: Caenogastropoda
- Order: Littorinimorpha
- Superfamily: Rissooidea
- Family: Rissoidae
- Genus: Alvania
- Species: A. cancellata

Binomial name
- Alvania cancellata (da Costa, 1778)

Synonyms
- Acinopsis cancellata (da Costa, 1778); Alvania (Acinopsis) cancellata (da Costa, 1778); Acinopsis cancellina (Locard, 1892); Acinopsis venter F. Nordsieck, 1972; Alvania cancellina Locard, 1891 ·; Alvania laxa Dautzenberg & H. Fischer, 1896; Alvania paupercula (Jeffreys, 1867); Rissoa (Alvania) laxa (Dautzenberg & Fischer, 1896); Rissoa cancellata (da Costa, 1778); Rissoa cancellata var. paupercula Jeffreys, 1867; Rissoa crenulata Michaud, 1830; Turbo cancellatus da Costa, 1778 (original combination)

= Alvania cancellata =

Species of mollusc

Alvania cancellata is a species of small sea snail, or micromollusc. It is a marine gastropod mollusk in the Rissoidae family.

== Description ==
The shell is yellowish white, tinted and faintly banded with chestnut. The shell has ribs along the length and spiral ridges, with bumps where they intersect. The shell contains 6-7 whorls, coming to a pointed spire. The suture is widely channelled. The aperture is expanded, brownish red and sulcate within, subcanaliculate below. The lip has distinct ridges along the outer edge, and the columella has anterior bumps.

== Distribution ==
This marine species occurs in the Mediterranean Sea (Corsica, Greece), in the Eastern Atlantic Ocean near Guernsey and Cornwall, English Channel, West Africa and near Madeira and the Azores.

Fossils were found in Pleistocene strata near Messina and Palermo, Sicily.
