= C. truncata =

C. truncata may refer to:

- Callyspongia truncata, a demosponge species
- Cyanea truncata, a flowering plant species
