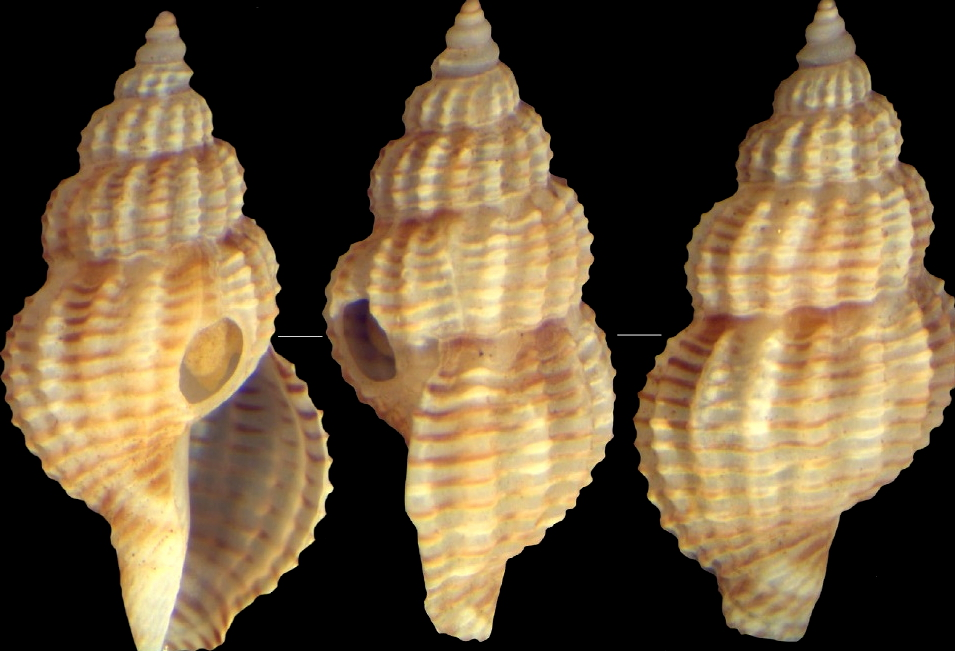

Scientific classification
- Kingdom: Animalia
- Phylum: Mollusca
- Class: Gastropoda
- Subclass: Caenogastropoda
- Order: Neogastropoda
- Superfamily: Conoidea
- Family: Raphitomidae
- Genus: Leufroyia
- Species: L. leufroyi

Binomial name
- Leufroyia leufroyi (Michaud, 1828)

Synonyms
- Clathurella mirabilis Locard, 1891 (dubious synonym); Defrancia leufroyi (Michaud, 1828); Defrancia leufroyi var. carnosula Jeffreys, 1867 (dubious syn.); Homotoma inflata (De Cristofori, 1832); Murex caudiculus Brusina, 1870; Pleurotoma inflata de Cristofori & Jan, 1832; Pleurotoma leufroyi Michaud, 1827 (original combination); Pleurotoma zonalis Delle Chiaje, 1830; Raphitoma boothii Brown in Smith, 1839 (not Smith, 1839); Raphitoma caudicula Nardo, 1848; Raphitoma cyrilli Scacchi, 1835; Raphitoma inflata (De Cristofori, 1832); Raphitoma leufroyi (Michaud, 1828); Raphitoma mirabilis Locard, 1891; Raphitoma zonalis Delle Chiaje, 1830

= Leufroyia leufroyi =

Species of gastropod

Leufroyia leufroyi is a species of sea snail, a marine gastropod mollusk in the family Raphitomidae.

== Description ==
The length of the shell reaches 16 mm, its diameter is 7 mm.

== Distribution ==
This species occurs in the Atlantic Ocean and the Mediterranean Sea. Fossils were found in Upper Pliocene strata in Italy.
