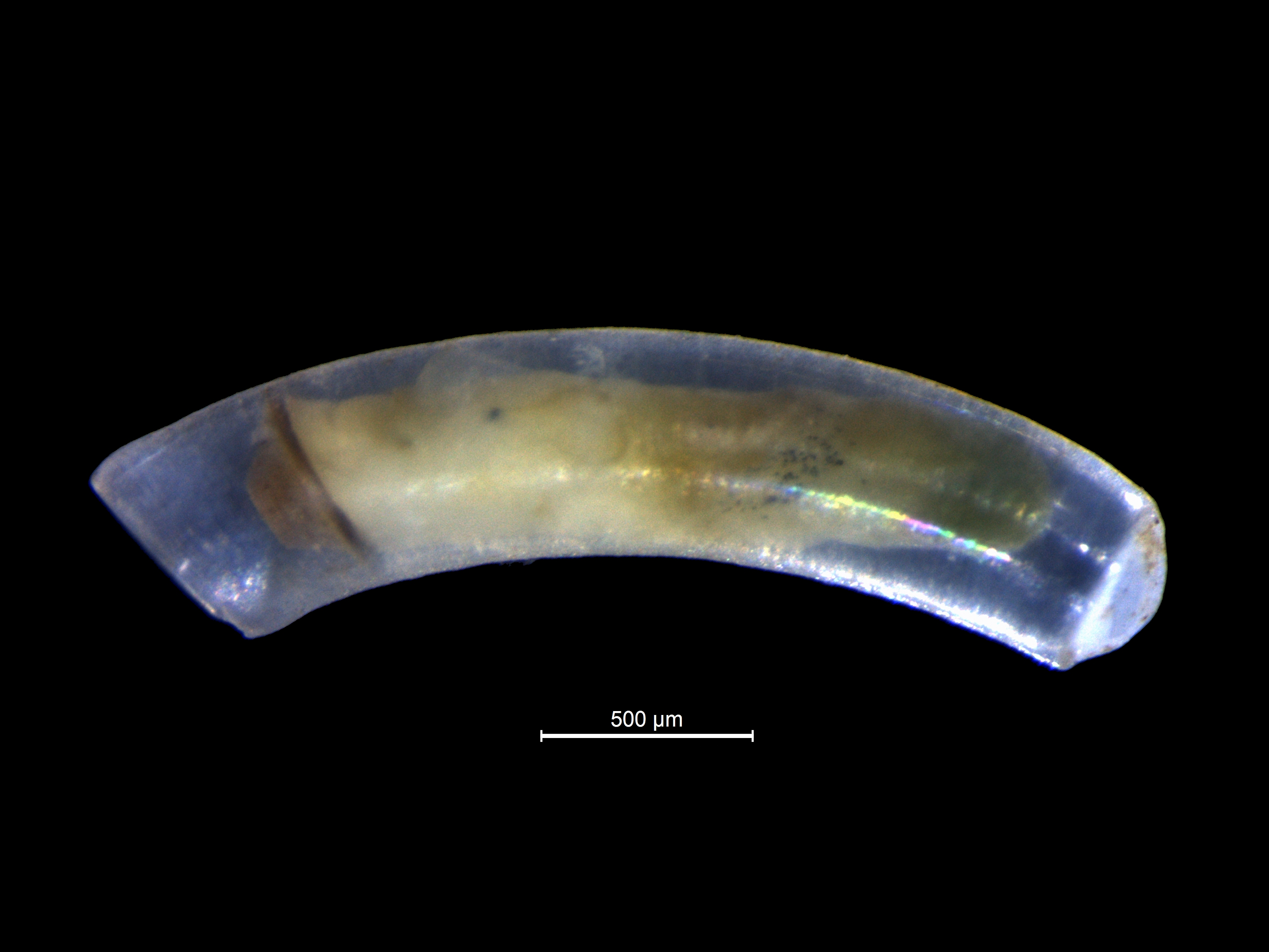

Scientific classification
- Kingdom: Animalia
- Phylum: Mollusca
- Class: Gastropoda
- Subclass: Caenogastropoda
- Order: Littorinimorpha
- Family: Caecidae
- Genus: Caecum
- Species: C. glabrum

Binomial name
- Caecum glabrum (Montagu, 1803)

= Caecum glabrum =

Species of gastropod

Caecum glabrum is a species of small sea snail, a marine gastropod mollusk or micromollusk in the family Caecidae.

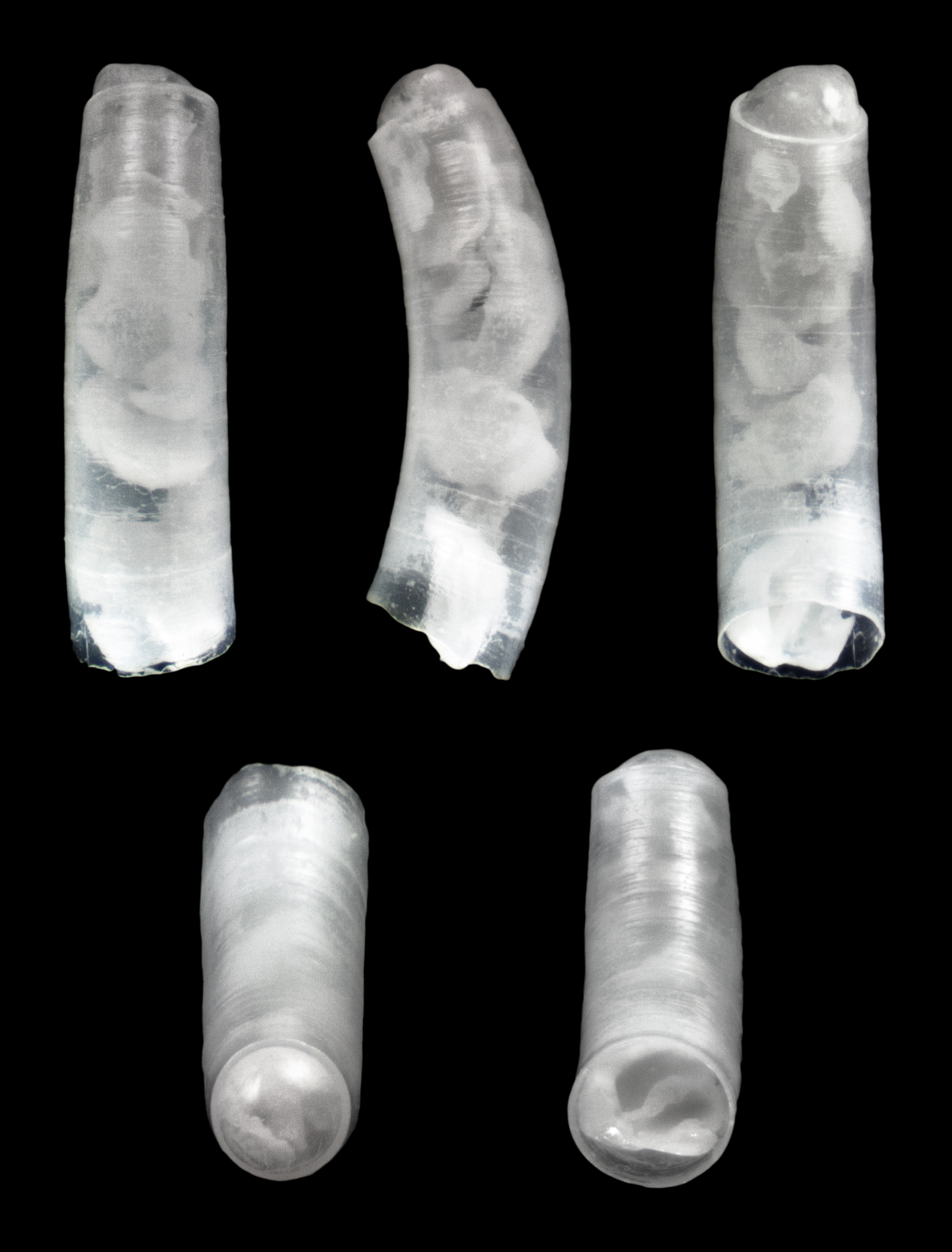
Shell of Caecum glabrum
