= Cyrillia linearis =

- Shell of Cyrillia linearis

Scientific classification
- Kingdom: Animalia
- Phylum: Mollusca
- Class: Gastropoda
- Subclass: Caenogastropoda
- Order: Neogastropoda
- Superfamily: Conoidea
- Family: Raphitomidae
- Genus: Cyrillia
- Species: C. linearis

Binomial name
- Cyrillia linearis (Montagu, 1803)

Synonyms
- Cenodagreutes coccyginus E. H. Smith, 1967; Defrancia linearis (Montagu, 1803); Fusus buchanensis MacGillivray, 1843; Holotoma elegans (Donovan, 1804); Mangelia linearis (Montagu, 1803); Murex cyrilli Scacchi, 1833; Murex elegans Donovan, 1804 (original combination); Murex linearis Montagu, 1803 (original combination); Philbertia linearis (Montagu, 1803); Pleurotoma muricoidea Blainville, 1829 (dubious synonym); Pleurotoma tricolor Risso, 1826; Raphitoma buchanensis Macgillivray, 1843; Raphitoma cranchiana Gray, 1852; Raphitoma cyrilli Brusina, 1866; Raphitoma elegans (Donovan, 1804); Raphitoma elegans Locard & Caziot, 1900; Raphitoma elegans Monterosato, 1875; Raphitoma linearis (Montagu, 1803); Raphitoma linearis Monterosato, 1875; Raphitoma muricoidea Blainville, 1829; Raphitoma rosea Brusina, 1866; Raphitoma tricolor Risso, 1826

Species of gastropod

Cyrillia linearis is a species of sea snail, a marine gastropod mollusk in the family Raphitomidae.

== Description ==
The shell is fusiform and turriculate. It has an elevated and acute spire. The twelve whorls are convex and longitudinally costated (twelve ribs on the body whorl). They are transversally sharply striated with 6-7 elevated lines, which run along the volutions. They are rather broader over the ribs and very sharp between them The outer lip is thickened on the outside with an obtuse varix or rib, but smooth within. The siphonal canal is short, rather broad and slightly inflected.

== Distribution ==
This marine species occurs in European waters from Norway to the Azores; in the Mediterranean Sea. Fossils were found in Pliocene strata in Italy.
