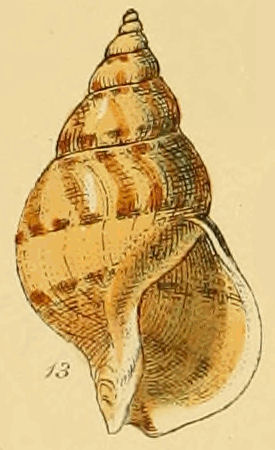

Scientific classification
- Kingdom: Animalia
- Phylum: Mollusca
- Class: Gastropoda
- Subclass: Caenogastropoda
- Order: Neogastropoda
- Family: Buccinidae
- Genus: Buccinum
- Species: B. humphreysianum

Binomial name
- Buccinum humphreysianum Bennet, 1824

Synonyms
- Buccinum atractodeum Locard, 1887; Buccinum euthriaeforme Paulus & Mars, 1942; Buccinum fusiforme Kiener, 1834 (Invalid: junior homonym of Buccinum fusiforme Borson, 1820; Buccinum kieneri is a replacement name); Buccinum gracile Settepassi, 1977 (not available, published in a work which does not consistently use binomial nomenclature (ICZN art. 11.4)); Buccinum humphreysianum var. azonata Locard, 1887; Buccinum humphreysianum var. lactea Jeffreys, 1867; Buccinum inflatum Aradas & Benoit, 1876 (Invalid: junior homonym of Buccinum inflatum Shaw, 1811); Buccinum inflatum panormitanum Settepassi, 1977 (not available, published in a work which does not consistently use binominal nomenclature (ICZN art. 11.4)); Buccinum inflatum partenopaeum Settepassi, 1977 (not available, published in a work which does not consistently use binominal nomenclature (ICZN art. 11.4)); Buccinum kieneri Monterosato, 1872 (Replacement name for Buccinum fusiforme Kiener, 1834); Buccinum liocephalum Pallary, 1931; Buccinum lusitanicum Pallary, 1931; Buccinum monterosatoi Locard, 1887; Buccinum monterosatoi var. flammulata Locard, 1887; Buccinum puxleianum Leach, 1852; Buccinum striatum Philippi, 1844 (Invalid: junior homonym of Buccinum striatum Pennant, 1777); Buccinum ventricosum Kiener, 1834 (Invalid: junior homonym of Buccinum ventricosum Grateloup, 1827)

= Buccinum humphreysianum =

Species of gastropod

Buccinum humphreysianum, common name Humphrey's buccinum, is a species of sea snail, a marine gastropod mollusk in the family Buccinidae, the true whelks.

== Description ==
The length of the shell varies between 40 mm and 80 mm. The ovate-conical shell is ventricose. Its color is of a reddish white, marked with undulated brown spots with red edges. The epidermis has a bright brown color. The shell is very fine and contains very close transverse striae, crossed by very fine and slightly apparent longitudinal striae. The spire is elongated, pointed and contains eight convex whorls to the spire. These are traversed sometimes by slightly prominent longitudinal folds. The aperture is very effuse, dilated outwardly and widely emarginated at its base. The outer lip is strongly arcuated.

== Distribution ==
This marine species has a wide distribution. It is circumboreal and also found off Japan, North America and Western Europe.
