= Melanella frielei =

- Shell of Melanella frielei (specimen at the Natural History Museum, Rotterdam)

Scientific classification
- Kingdom: Animalia
- Phylum: Mollusca
- Class: Gastropoda
- Subclass: Caenogastropoda
- Order: Littorinimorpha
- Family: Eulimidae
- Genus: Melanella
- Species: M. frielei

Binomial name
- Melanella frielei (Jordan, 1895)

Synonyms
- Eulima anceps J. T. Marshall, 1901; Eulima frielei H. K. Jordan, 1895; Eulima xiphidiopsis Dautzenberg & H. Fischer, 1896; Melanella anceps (J. T. Marshall, 1901); Melanella xiphidiopsis (Dautzenberg & H. Fischer, 1896) ·

Species of gastropod

Melanella frielei is a species of sea snail, a marine gastropod mollusk in the family Eulimidae.

== Description ==
The length of the shell attains 7.6 mm, its diameter 2.3 mm.

(Original description) The shell is slender, of moderate thickness, semi-opaque, and glossy. The sculpture consists of indistinct microscopic lines of growth, and the color is opaline white. The spire is straight, long, and tapers to a very fine point. There are 13 to 14 whorls, which are quite flat, with the body whorl occupying one-third of the entire length of the shell. The periphery is sharply rounded, but it is not keeled. The suture is linear and nearly straight.

The aperture is somewhat rhomboidal, twice as long as it is broad, and forms about one-quarter of the total length of the shell; it is expanded below where the outer lip projects. The outer lip retreats above and below. The inner lip forms a glaze on the body whorl and is reflected over the oblique, straight columella below, with the body and the columella forming an obtuse angle at their junction. The operculum is ear-shaped, with a narrow median spiral groove.

== Distribution ==
This marine species occurs in the North Sea and in the Atlantic Ocean off North Africa.
