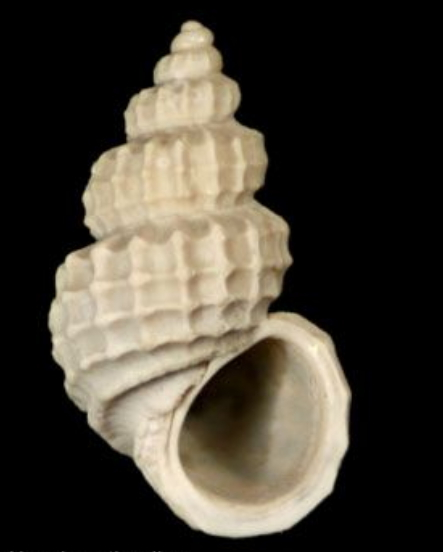
- Shell of Alvania zetlandica (specimen at the Natural History Museum, Rotterdam)

Scientific classification
- Kingdom: Animalia
- Phylum: Mollusca
- Class: Gastropoda
- Subclass: Caenogastropoda
- Order: Littorinimorpha
- Family: Rissoidae
- Genus: Alvania
- Species: A. zetlandica

Binomial name
- Alvania zetlandica (Montagu, 1815)

Synonyms
- Alvinia zetlandica Montagu, 1815; Alvania (Taraniellia) zetlandica (Montagu, 1815); Manzonia zetlandica (Montagu, 1815); Rissoa canaliculata Philippi, 1844 (dubious synonym); Rissoa carinata Aradas, 1847; Rissoa cyclostoma Récluz, 1843 (incorrect subsequent spelling); Rissoa cyclostomata Récluz, 1843 (dubious synonym); Rissoa scalariformis Metcalfe in Thorpe, 1844; Taramellia zetlandica (Montagu, 1816) superseded combination; Turbo zetlandicus Montagu, 1815 (basionym)

= Alvania zetlandica =

Species of gastropod

Alvania zetlandica is a species of small sea snail, a marine gastropod mollusk or micromollusk in the family Rissoidae.

== Description ==
The length of the shell varies between 2.5 mm and 5 mm.

The imperforate shell is solid, opaque and whitish. It is cancellated and almost muricated by subequal longitudinal and spiral distant lirae. The shell contains seven whorls, angularly shouldered above and with a deep suture. The longitudinal sculpture is evanescent on the lower part of the body whorl, where the spiral sculpture becomes more prominent. The outer lip is thickened.

== Distribution ==
This species occurs in European waters (also off the Cape Verde), the Mediterranean Sea and arctic waters of Canada.

Fossils were found in Pleistocene strata near Messina and in Pliocene strata near Savona, Italy.
