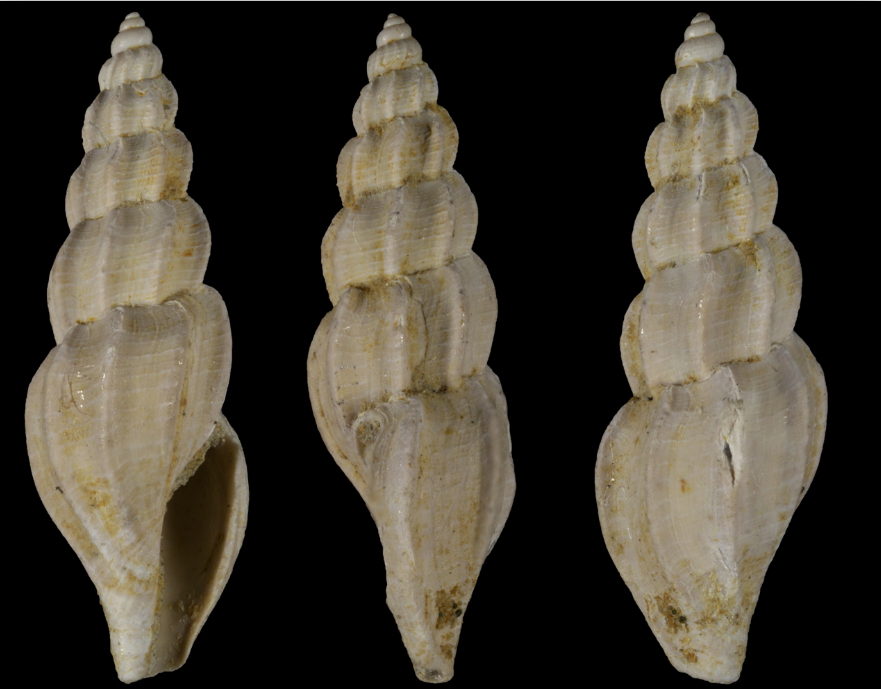
- Shell of Mangelia coarctata (specimen at MNHN, Paris)

Scientific classification
- Kingdom: Animalia
- Phylum: Mollusca
- Class: Gastropoda
- Subclass: Caenogastropoda
- Order: Neogastropoda
- Superfamily: Conoidea
- Family: Mangeliidae
- Genus: Mangelia
- Species: M. coarctata

Binomial name
- Mangelia coarctata (Forbes, 1840)

Synonyms
- Cytharella coarctata (Forbes, 1840) superseded combination; Pleurotoma coarctata Forbes, 1840 superseded combination; † Pleurotoma prismaticum Brugnone, 1862 junior subjective synonym

= Mangelia coarctata =

Species of gastropod

Mangelia coarctata is a species of sea snail, a marine gastropod mollusk in the family Mangeliidae.

== Description ==
The length of the shell attains 10 mm.

== Distribution ==
This species occurs in the Mediterranean Sea off Greece.

Fossils have been found in Pliocene strata in the Alpes-Maritimes, france.
