= Notonomus truncatus =

Scientific classification
- Kingdom: Animalia
- Phylum: Arthropoda
- Class: Insecta
- Order: Coleoptera
- Suborder: Adephaga
- Family: Carabidae
- Genus: Notonomus
- Species: N. truncatus

Binomial name
- Notonomus truncatus Sloane, 1916

Species of beetle

Notonomus truncatus is a species of ground beetle in the subfamily Pterostichinae. It was described by Sloane in 1916.
