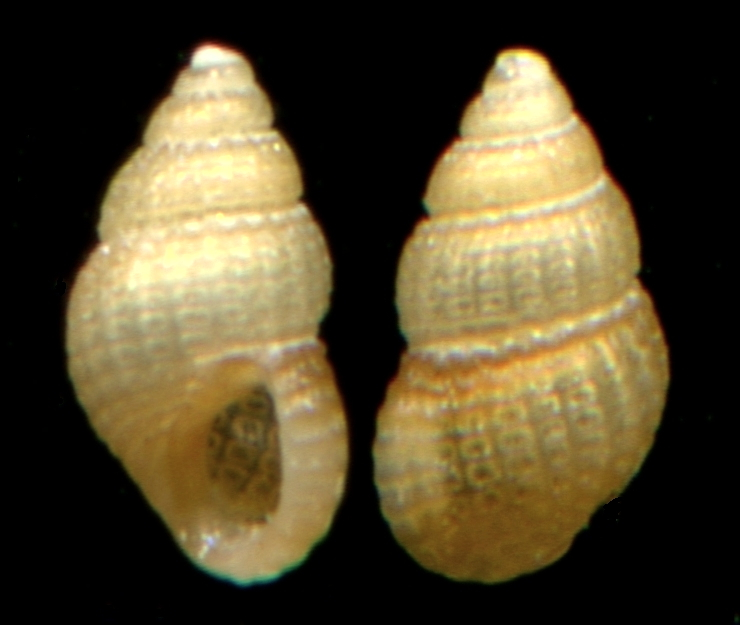
- Shell of Alvania beanii

Scientific classification
- Kingdom: Animalia
- Phylum: Mollusca
- Class: Gastropoda
- Subclass: Caenogastropoda
- Order: Littorinimorpha
- Superfamily: Rissooidea
- Family: Rissoidae
- Genus: Alvania
- Species: A. beanii

Binomial name
- Alvania beanii (Hanley in Thorpe, 1844)

Synonyms
- Alvania (Turbona) beanii Thorpe, 1844; Alvania beani [sic] (misspelling); Alvania beanii calathus (Forbes & Hanley, 1850); Alvania brocchii Weinkauff, 1868; Alvania calathus (Forbes & Hanley, 1850); Alvania reticulata (Montagu, 1803); Alvania (Turbona) reticulata (Montagu, 1803); † Alvania tenuicostata L. Seguenza, 1903; Cingula beanii Hanley, 1844; Rissoa calathus Forbes & Hanley, 1850; Rissoa textilis R. A. Philippi, 1844 junior subjective synonym; Turbo reticulatus J. Adams, 1797 (invalid: junior homonym of Turbo reticulatus Solander, 1766); Turbo reticulatus Montagu, 1803; Turbona calathus (Forbes & Hanley, 1850); Turbona cyrtoidea F. Nordsieck, 1972

= Alvania beanii =

Species of gastropod

Alvania beanii is a species of small sea snail, a marine gastropod mollusc or micromollusk in the family Rissoidae.

== Description ==
The length of the shell varies between 2.2 mm and 4 mm.

This broad shell has an oval-conical shape. It contains up to seven whorls and with deep sutures. The protoconch is multispiral. Its surface is reticulated by the close-packed ribs and the spiral cords (6 to 7 spiral cords on the body whorl above the aperture). The large aperture has an oval shape with a thick rim. The outer lip shows internal ridges and a well-developed varix. The inner lip is reflected over the umbilical region (but there is no umbilicus).

The color of the shell is white, cream or orange. There are often two brown bands on the body whorl.

== Distribution ==
This species occurs in European waters, from the North Coast of Norway and the North East Atlantic Ocean down to the Canary Islands. It can also be found in the Mediterranean Sea (Corsica, Tunisia, Greece, Turkey).

Fossils have been found in Scaldisian (Pliocene) strata in Suffolk, Great Britain; in Pleistocene strata in Belfast, Northern Ireland and Santa Flavia, Sicily.
