= Neuroxena truncatus =

Scientific classification
- Kingdom: Animalia
- Phylum: Arthropoda
- Clade: Pancrustacea
- Class: Insecta
- Order: Lepidoptera
- Superfamily: Noctuoidea
- Family: Erebidae
- Subfamily: Arctiinae
- Genus: Neuroxena
- Species: N. truncatus

Binomial name
- Neuroxena truncatus (Rothschild, 1933)

Synonyms
- Creatonotos truncatus Rothschild, 1933

Species of moth

Neuroxena truncatus is a moth of the subfamily Arctiinae. It is found in Ghana.
