= Melanella lubrica =

- Shell of Melanella lubrica (specimen at the Naturalis Biodiversity Center)

Scientific classification
- Kingdom: Animalia
- Phylum: Mollusca
- Class: Gastropoda
- Subclass: Caenogastropoda
- Order: Littorinimorpha
- Superfamily: Vanikoroidea
- Family: Eulimidae
- Genus: Melanella
- Species: M. lubrica

Binomial name
- Melanella lubrica (Monterosato, 1890)

Synonyms
- Acicularia lubrica Monterosato, 1890; Eulima intermedia var. solidula Monterosato, 1878

Species of gastropod

Melanella lubrica is a species of sea snail, a marine gastropod mollusk in the family Eulimidae.

== Description ==
The length of the shell attains 6.5 mm.

(Original description in Italian) Dall states that the form described and illustrated by Jeffreys is identical to the exotic Eulima oleacea, Kurtz and Stimpson (1851). However, I feel a great reluctance to identify our local shells with those from distant seas, and under this impression, the name lubrica instead of oleacea is proposed for the species under examination.

== Distribution ==
This species occurs in the North Sea and the Mediterranean Sea.
