= Boreotrophon truncatus =

Scientific classification
- Kingdom: Animalia
- Phylum: Mollusca
- Class: Gastropoda
- Subclass: Caenogastropoda
- Order: Neogastropoda
- Family: Muricidae
- Genus: Boreotrophon
- Species: B. truncatus

Binomial name
- Boreotrophon truncatus (Ström, 1768)

Synonyms
- Buccinum truncatum Ström, 1768; Trophon truncatus (Ström, 1768); Trophon truncatus var. abbreviata Mörch, 1869; Trophon truncatus var. alba Jeffreys, 1867; Trophon truncatus var. scalaris Jeffreys, 1867

Species of gastropod

Boreotrophon truncatus, common name the bobtail trophon, is a species of sea snail, a marine gastropod mollusk in the family Muricidae, the murex snails or rock snails.
