= Chauvetiidae =

Scientific classification
- Kingdom: Animalia
- Phylum: Mollusca
- Class: Gastropoda
- Subclass: Caenogastropoda
- Order: Neogastropoda
- Superfamily: Buccinoidea
- Family: Chauvetiidae; Kantor, Fedosov, Kosyan, Puillandre, Sorokin, Kano, R. Clark & Bouchet, 2021

Genera
- See text

Synonyms
- Donovaniidae T. L. Casey, 1904 unavailable name (Invalid: type genus a junior homonym of Donovania Leach, 1814 [Crustacea]).; Lachesinae Bellardi, 1877 (Invalid: type genus a junior homonym of Lachesis Daudin, 1803 [Reptilia])

Family of sea snails

The Chauvetiidae are a taxonomic family of large sea snails, often known as whelks in the superfamily Buccinoidea.

== Genera ==
- Chauvetia Monterosato, 1884

Synonyms

- Chauvetiella F. Nordsieck, 1968: synonym of Chauvetia Monterosato, 1884
- Donovania Bucquoy, Dautzenberg & Dollfus, 1883: synonym of Chauvetia Monterosato, 1884 (invalid: junior homonym of Donovania Leach, 1814 [Crustacea]; Chauvetia and Syntagma are replacement names)
- Donovaniella F. Nordsieck, 1968: synonym of Chauvetia Monterosato, 1884 (junior subjective synonym)
- Folineaea Monterosato, 1884: synonym of Chauvetia Monterosato, 1884
- Folinia [sic]: synonym of Chauvetia Monterosato, 1884 (misspelling of Folineaea Monterosato, 1884; non Folinia Crosse, 1868)
- Lachesis Risso, 1826: synonym of Chauvetia Monterosato, 1884(invalid: junior homonym of Lachesis Daudin, 1803 [Reptilia]; Donovania and Syntagma are replacement names)
- Nesaea Risso, 1826: synonym of Chauvetia Monterosato, 1884 (invalid: junior homonym of Nesaea Leach, 1814 [Crustacea]; Donovania and Chauvetia are replacement names)
- Syntagma Iredale, 1918:synonym of Chauvetia Monterosato, 1884 (junior objective synonym, Invalid: junior objective synonym of Chauvetia)
