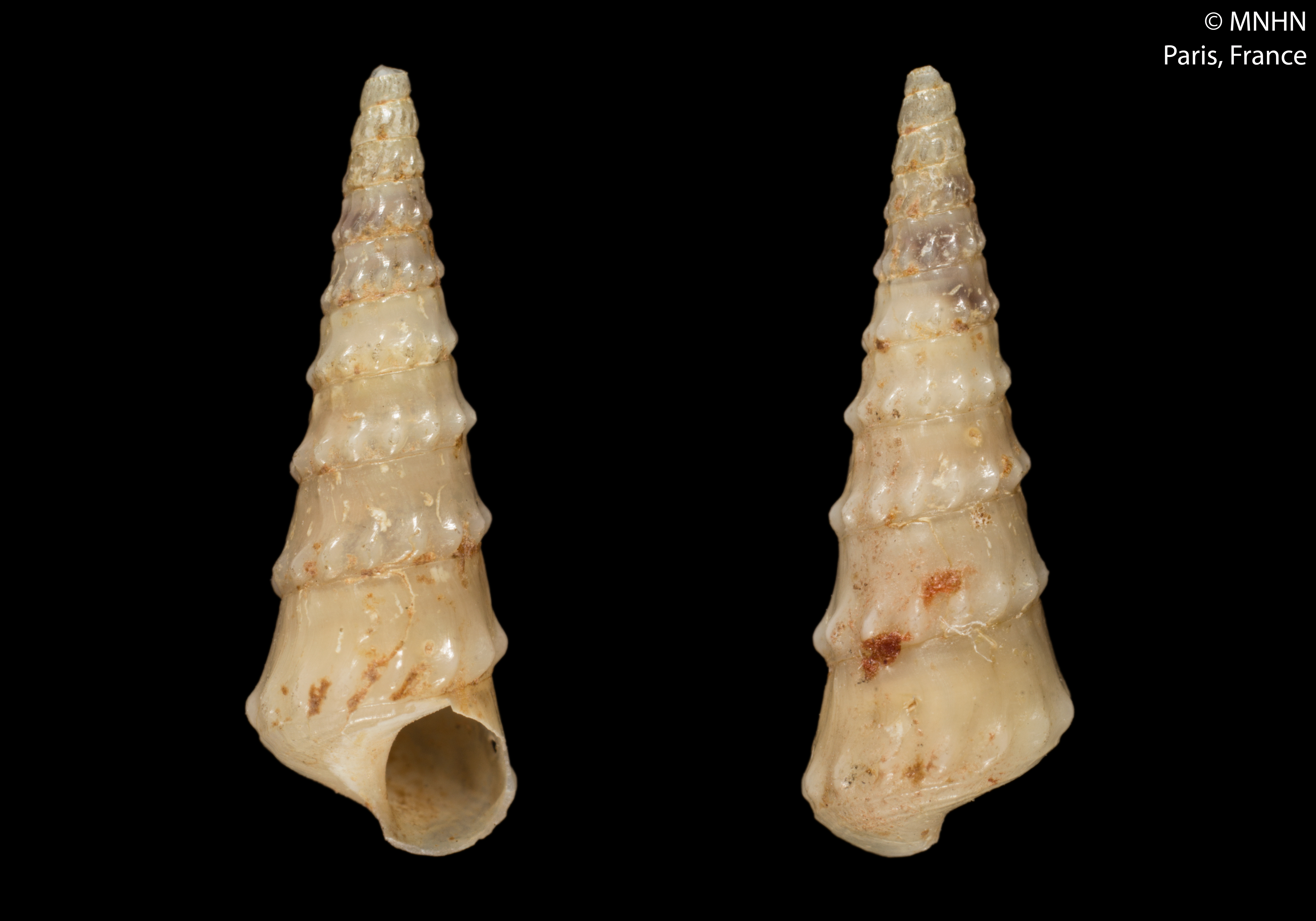
- Shell of Abyssochrysos eburneus (specimen at MNHN, Paris)

Scientific classification
- Kingdom: Animalia
- Phylum: Mollusca
- Class: Gastropoda
- Subclass: Caenogastropoda
- Order: incertae sedis
- Family: Abyssochrysidae
- Genus: Abyssochrysos
- Species: A. eburneus

Binomial name
- Abyssochrysos eburneus (Locard, 1897)

Synonyms
- Abyssochrysos eburneum (Locard, 1897) (incorrect gender ending)

= Abyssochrysos eburneus =

Species of gastropod

Abyssochrysos eburneus is a species of sea snail, a marine gastropod mollusk in the family Abyssochrysidae.

== Distribution ==
This species is found off West Africa.
