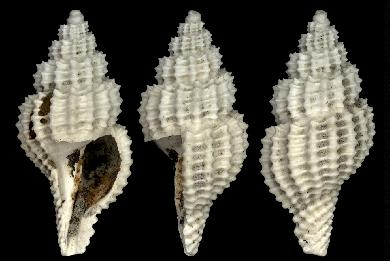
- Shell of Raphitoma purpurea (specimen at MNHN, Paris)

Scientific classification
- Kingdom: Animalia
- Phylum: Mollusca
- Class: Gastropoda
- Subclass: Caenogastropoda
- Order: Neogastropoda
- Superfamily: Conoidea
- Family: Raphitomidae
- Genus: Raphitoma
- Species: R. purpurea

Binomial name
- Raphitoma purpurea (Montagu, 1803)

Synonyms
- Clathurella purpurea (Montagu, 1803); Defrancia purpurea (Montagu, 1803); Fusus purpureus Fleming, 1828; Homotoma purpurea Montagu, 1804; Mangelia purpurea Risso, 1826; Murex purpureus Montagu, 1803; Philbertia purpurea (Montagu, 1803); Raphitoma (Cyrtoides) rudis intermedia F. Nordsieck, 1968 (dubious syn.); Pleurotoma corbis Pot. & Michd., 1838; Pleurotoma cordieri Grat., 1832; Pleurotoma fallax Forbes, 1844; Pleurotoma purpurea Blainville, 1829; Pleurotoma purpureum MacAndrew, 1851; Pleurotoma (Clathurella) purpurea Watson, 1897; Pleurotoma (Defrancia) purpurea P. Fischer, 1878; Raphitoma elegans Blainville, 1829; Raphitoma fallax Forbes, 1844; Raphitoma lineolata fuscata F. Nordsieck, 1977; Raphitoma punctatus Brown, 1827; Raphitoma (Philbertia) purpurea Nordsieck, 1968

= Raphitoma purpurea =

Species of gastropod

Raphitoma purpurea is a species of sea snail, a marine gastropod mollusk in the family Raphitomidae.

This species forms a complex with Raphitoma bourguignati (Locard, 1891), Raphitoma atropurpurea (Locard & Caziot, 1899), and Raphitoma digiulioi Pusateri & Giannuzzi Savelli, 2017.

== Description ==
The length of the shell varies between 9 mm and 24 mm, its diameter between 4.9 mm and 9.5 mm.

(Original description) The species shows a very rugose, fusiform and robust shell. It has a of a dark purple colour with sometimes a few spots or blotches of white. It contains nine or ten whorls, rounded, and tapering to an extremely fine, sharp apex. They contain nineteen or twenty ribs, running a little oblique to the right. They are crossed by numerous sharp, elevated ridges, which rise into angles upon the ribs, making the shell very rough, and giving it a cancellated appearance. The aperture is narrow, oval and terminates into a strait siphonal canal. The outer lip is thin. The margin is white, crenated by the striae. The columella striated transversely oblique to the end of the siphonal canal, and somewhat tuberculated. Inside it is purple, marked by the ribs.

The whorls are usually well rounded, clathrate by narrow ribs and almost equally strong revolving ridges. The color of the shell is reddish or purplish brown, white-zoned below the middle of the body whorl, the zone distinct within the lip.

== Distribution ==
This species occurs in the Mediterranean Sea and in the Atlantic Ocean from Northern Europa, the Azores, the Canary Islands to Angola. Fossils were found in Upper Pliocene strata in Italy.
