= Bathysciadium xylophagum =

Scientific classification
- Kingdom: Animalia
- Phylum: Mollusca
- Class: Gastropoda
- Subclass: Vetigastropoda
- Family: Bathysciadiidae
- Genus: Bathysciadium
- Species: B. xylophagum

Binomial name
- Bathysciadium xylophagum Warén & Carrozzza in Warén, 1995

Species of gastropod

Bathysciadium xylophagum is a species of sea snail, deep-sea limpet, a marine gastropod mollusk in the family Bathysciadiidae.

== Distribution ==
- Mediterranean Sea
- European waters
