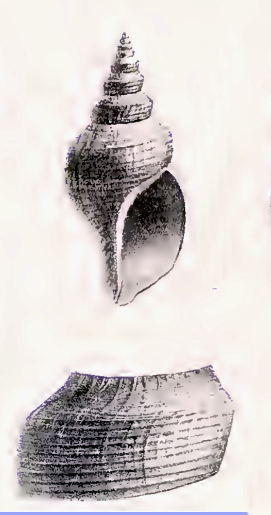
- Bathybela nudator

Scientific classification
- Kingdom: Animalia
- Phylum: Mollusca
- Class: Gastropoda
- Subclass: Caenogastropoda
- Order: Neogastropoda
- Superfamily: Conoidea
- Family: Raphitomidae
- Genus: Bathybela; Kobelt, 1905

Type species
- Thesbia nudator Locard, 1897

Species
- See text

= Bathybela =

Genus of gastropods

Bathybela is a genus of sea snails, marine gastropod mollusks in the family Raphitomidae. It has four described species.

== Species ==
Species within the genus Bathybela include:

- Bathybela nudator (Locard, 1897)
- Bathybela papyracea Waren & Bouchet, 2001
- Bathybela tenelluna (Locard, 1897)

Species brought in to synonymy

- Bathybela costlowi Petuch, 1974: synonym of Bathybela tenelluna (Locard, 1897)
- Bathybela oculifera Kantor, Yu.I. & A.V. Sysoev, 1986: synonym of Gymnobela oculifera Kantor, Yu.I. & A.V. Sysoev, 1986
- Bathybela tenellunum: synonym of Bathybela tenelluna (Locard, 1897)
