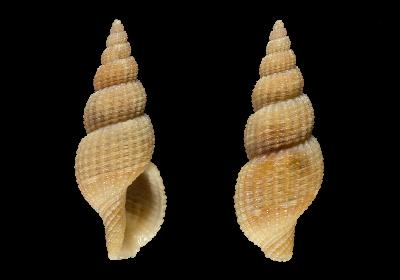
- Shell of Raphitoma bourguignati (specimen at MNHN, Paris)

Scientific classification
- Kingdom: Animalia
- Phylum: Mollusca
- Class: Gastropoda
- Subclass: Caenogastropoda
- Order: Neogastropoda
- Superfamily: Conoidea
- Family: Raphitomidae
- Genus: Raphitoma
- Species: R. bourguignati

Binomial name
- Raphitoma bourguignati (Locard, 1891)

Synonyms
- Clathurella bourguignati Locard, 1891 (original combination); Raphitoma (Philbertia) bourguignati (Locard, 1891)

= Raphitoma bourguignati =

Species of gastropod

Raphitoma bourguignati is a species of sea snail, a marine gastropod mollusc in the family Raphitomidae.

== Description ==
The length of the shell reaches a length of 22 mm and a diameter of 8 mm.

This species was previously included in the speciescomplex Raphitoma purpurea. Compared with R. purpurea, the shell is narrower and the spire is more slender. The whorls are less convex. The axial ribs are very close, larger and more regular. They form with the spiral threads a regular reticulation with nodules. The ground color of the shell is a bright pale yellow.

== Distribution ==
This marine species occurs in the Atlantic Ocean off France
