= Pilus conicus =

Scientific classification
- Kingdom: Animalia
- Phylum: Mollusca
- Class: Gastropoda
- Subclass: Vetigastropoda
- Family: Bathysciadiidae
- Genus: Pilus
- Species: P. conicus

Binomial name
- Pilus conicus (Verrill, 1884)

Synonyms
- Cocculina conica Verrill 1884 (basionym)

Species of gastropod

Pilus conicus is a species of sea snail, a marine gastropod mollusk in the family Pseudococculinidae.

== Description ==
The size of the shell is 1 mm.

== Distribution ==
This species occurs in the Atlantic Ocean off New England, USA; in the Rockall Trough; in the Mediterranean Sea.

== Description ==
The maximum recorded shell length is 1 mm.

== Habitat ==
Minimum recorded depth is 913 m. Maximum recorded depth is 913 m.
