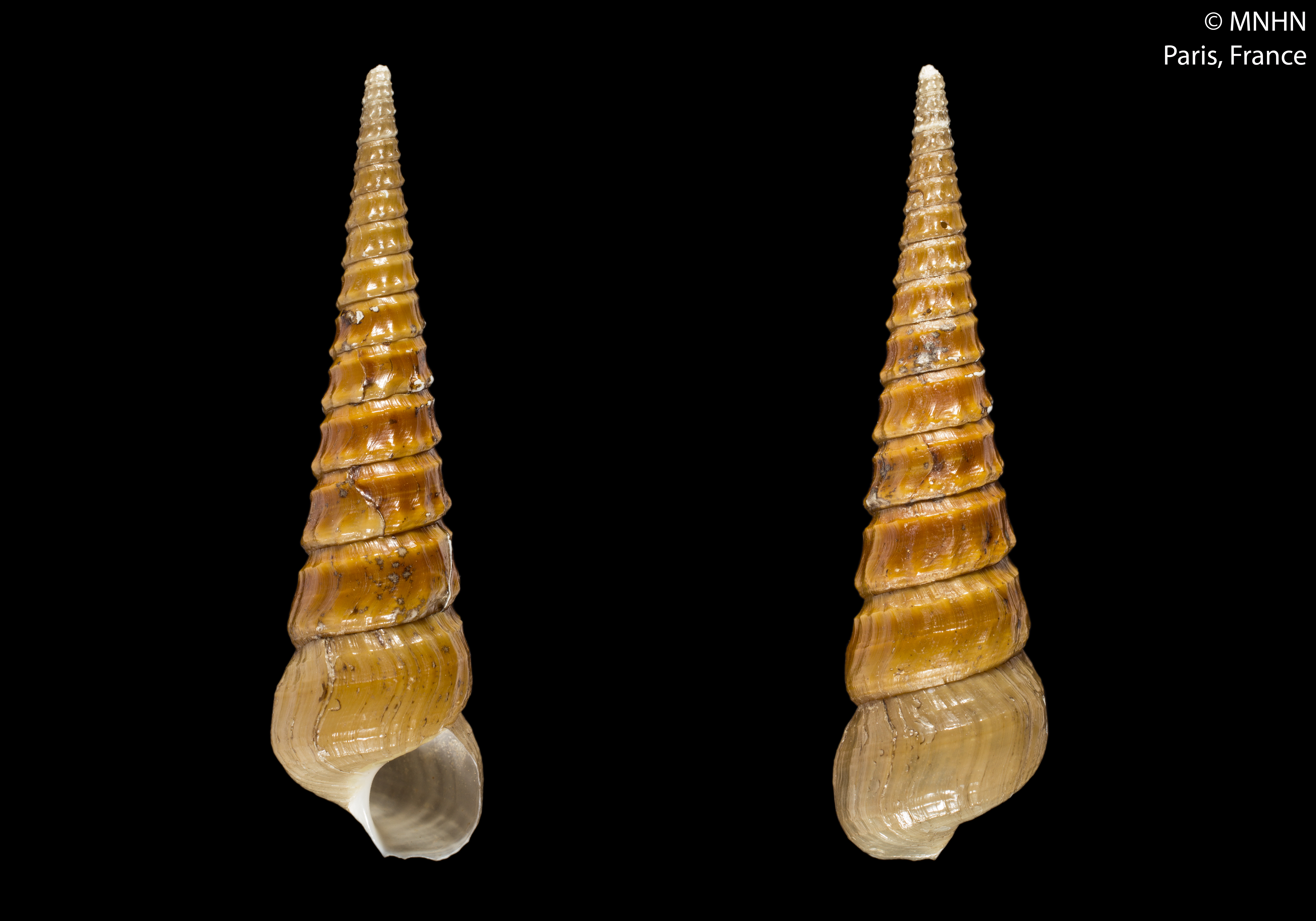
- Shell of Abyssochrysos bicinctus (specimen at MNHN, Paris)

Scientific classification
- Kingdom: Animalia
- Phylum: Mollusca
- Class: Gastropoda
- Subclass: Caenogastropoda
- Order: incertae sedis
- Family: Abyssochrysidae
- Genus: Abyssochrysos
- Species: A. bicinctus

Binomial name
- Abyssochrysos bicinctus Bouchet, 1991

Synonyms
- Abyssochrysos bicinctum Bouchet, 1991

= Abyssochrysos bicinctus =

Species of gastropod

Abyssochrysos bicinctus is a species of sea snail, a marine gastropod mollusk in the family Abyssochrysidae.

== Description ==
Shell large, solid, slender consisting of 15 whorls. Apex (protoconch and an indeterminate number of early teleoconch whorls) corroded. Early spire whorls rather flat, later becoming concave. Sculpture consisting of axial ribs forming two strong knobs, one above and one below the suture. In the topmost five remaining teleoconch whorls the ribs become lower and almost disappear in the median part of the whorl. In later whorls the median part of the whorl is concave and the subsutural knobs are more or less fused to each other to form a sharp spiral keel demarcating the sutural ramp. The suprasutural knobs, on the contrary, remain strong and stay separate. The body whorl is regularly convex and there also the suprasutural knobs are weaker and fused to each other. There are 13 axial pairs of knobs on the earlier teleoconch whorls, and this number increases to 22 on the penultimate whorl, where they, however, are weaker. On the last three whorls of the holotype there is also a spiral sculpture, starting as indistinct spiral cords on the concave part of the whorl. On the body whorl there are about 15 such cords, some of which are as strong as the two main keels. The base is regularly rounded, with ill-defined periphery and no distinct basal disc. No umbilicus. The aperture is rounded and lacks siphonal canal. The outer lip is sharp and thin. Inner lip indistinct except for a thin glaze applied to body whorl. Shell whitish. Periostracum thick, deep amber brown, with strong, curved incremental growth lines

— P. Bouchet

== Distribution ==
This marine species occurs in the Makassar Strait, Indonesia.
