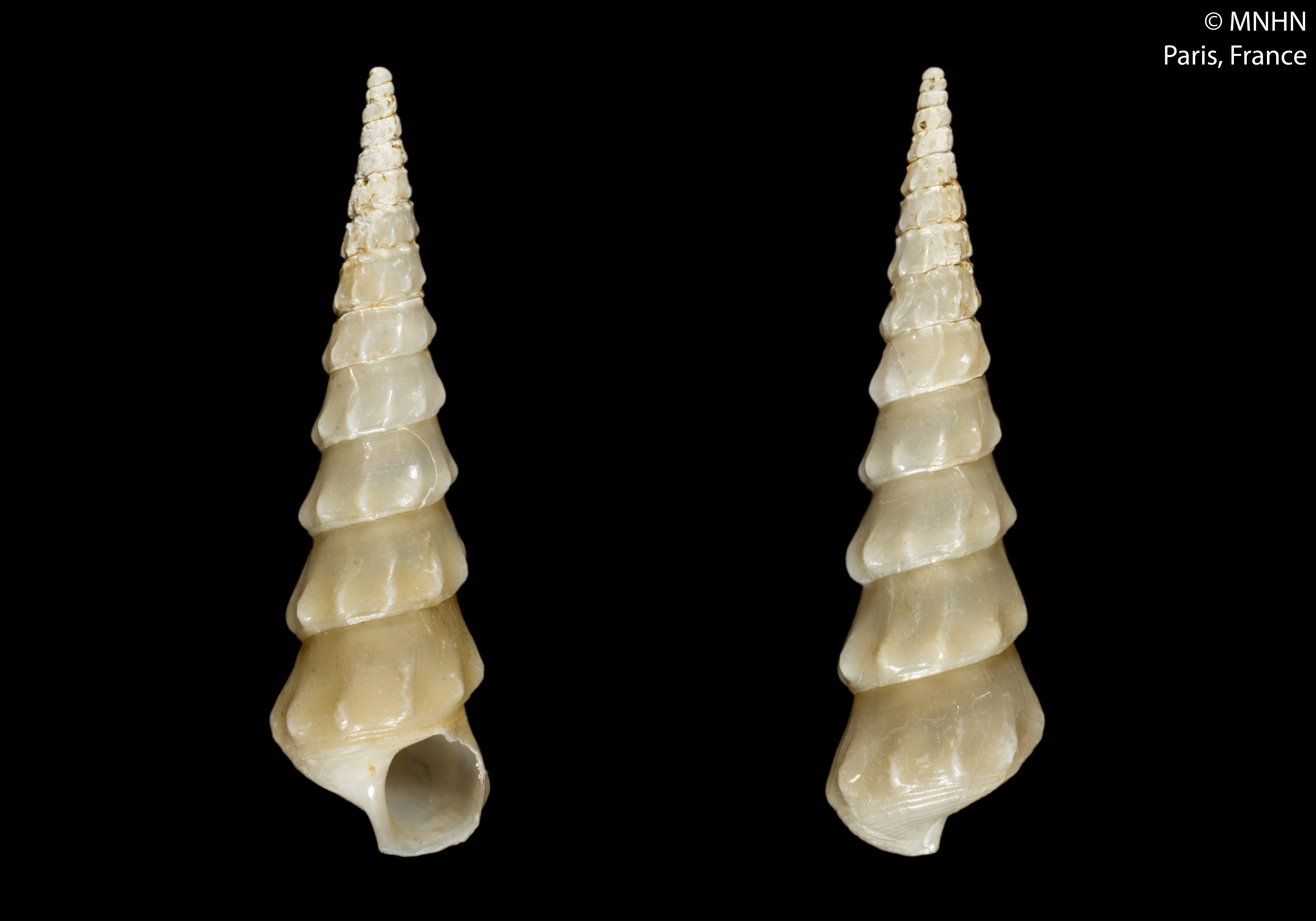
- Shell of Abyssochrysos brasilianus (specimen at MNHN, paris)

Scientific classification
- Kingdom: Animalia
- Phylum: Mollusca
- Class: Gastropoda
- Subclass: Caenogastropoda
- Order: incertae sedis
- Family: Abyssochrysidae
- Genus: Abyssochrysos
- Species: A. brasilianus

Binomial name
- Abyssochrysos brasilianus Bouchet, 1991

Synonyms
- Abyssochrysos brasilianum Bouchet, 1991 (incorrect gender ending)

= Abyssochrysos brasilianus =

Species of gastropod

Abyssochrysos brasilianus is a species of sea snail, a marine gastropod mollusk in the family Abyssochrysidae.

== Distribution ==
A. brasilianus is found on the continental slope off southeastern Brazil.

== Description ==
The maximum recorded shell length is 23.6 millimetres (0.93 in).

== Habitat ==
Minimum recorded depth is 620 metres (2,030 ft). Maximum recorded depth is 1,540 metres (5,050 ft).
