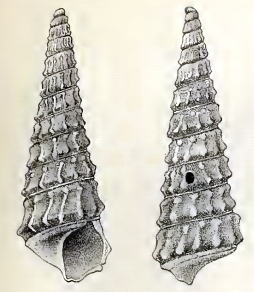
- Original drawing with two views of a shell of Abyssochrysos melvilli

Scientific classification
- Kingdom: Animalia
- Phylum: Mollusca
- Class: Gastropoda
- Subclass: Caenogastropoda
- Order: incertae sedis
- Family: Abyssochrysidae
- Genus: Abyssochrysos
- Species: A. melvilli

Binomial name
- Abyssochrysos melvilli (Schepman, 1909)

Synonyms
- Abyssochrysos tomlini Barnard, K.H., 1963; Argyropeza melvilli Schepman, 1909 (original description); Argyropeza suavensis Ladd, H.S., 1977

= Abyssochrysos melvilli =

Melvill's abyssal shell

Species of gastropod

Abyssochrysos melvilli, common name Melvill's abyssal shell, is a species of sea snail, a marine gastropod mollusc in the family Abyssochrysidae.

== Description ==
(Original description by M. Schepman) The size of the shell varies between 10 and 50 millimetres (0.39 and 1.97 in). The small, white shell has a pyramidal shape. The spire consists of 11½ whorls of which nearly 2 form the nucleus. The first whorl is rather bulbous and smooth. The second whorls is radiately ribbed and also swollen. The remaining whorls increase regularly in size. They are slightly contracted above and below, nearly straight towards the middle, with two spiral rows of pointed nodules, connected by slight spirals and oblique radiating ribs. Moreover, the shell has a thin spiral, just above the linear suture. The rest of the surface is smooth and shining, with a slight nacreous lustre and with numerous fine growth striae. The body whorl is conspicuously keeled below the periphery and with a second keel at some distance on the smooth base. The aperture is subrhombic. The outer margin is thin, angulate at the end of the lower row of nodules. The columellar margin is rounded, slightly curved, ending in a point, where it joins the basal margin.

M.Schepman was much puzzled by this species and couldn't readily place it. He tentatively placed it in the genus Argyropeza.

== Distribution ==
This species occurs in the Southwest Pacific Ocean and off Southeast Africa.
