= Abyssochrysos xouthos =

Scientific classification
- Kingdom: Animalia
- Phylum: Mollusca
- Class: Gastropoda
- Subclass: Caenogastropoda
- Order: incertae sedis
- Family: Abyssochrysidae
- Genus: Abyssochrysos
- Species: A. xouthos

Binomial name
- Abyssochrysos xouthos Killeen & Oliver, 2000

Species of gastropod

Abyssochrysos xouthos is a species of sea snail, a marine gastropod mollusk in the family Abyssochrysidae.

== Distribution ==
This marine species occurs off Oman.
