= Bathysciadium costulatum =

Scientific classification
- Kingdom: Animalia
- Phylum: Mollusca
- Class: Gastropoda
- Subclass: Vetigastropoda
- Family: Bathysciadiidae
- Genus: Bathysciadium
- Species: B. costulatum

Binomial name
- Bathysciadium costulatum (Locard, 1898)

Synonyms
- Lepeta costulata Locard 1898; Bathysciadium conicum Dautzenberg & Fischer H. 1900

Species of gastropod

Bathysciadium costulatum is a species of sea snail, deep-sea limpet, a marine gastropod mollusk in the family Bathysciadiidae.

== Distribution ==
- European waters

== Description ==
The maximum recorded shell length is 1.5 mm.

== Habitat ==
Minimum recorded depth is 808 m. Maximum recorded depth is 1400 m.
