= Arnould Locard =

French naturalist, malacologist and geologist

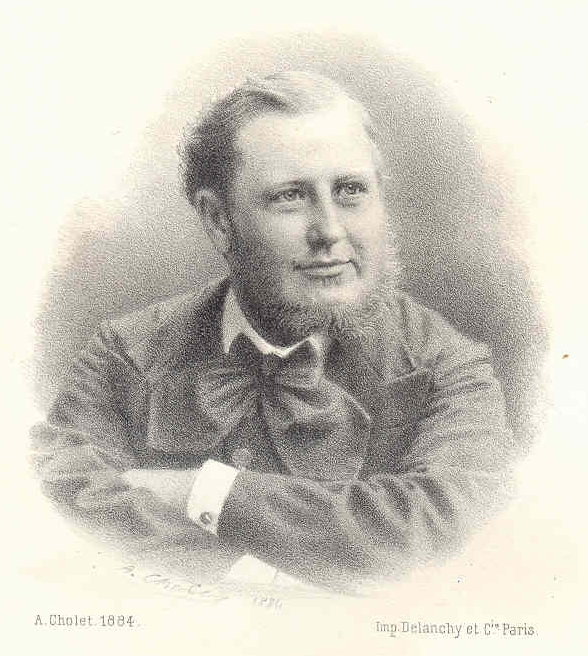
- Arnould Locard
- Born: 8 December 1841; Lyon
- Died: 28 October 1904 (aged 62)
- Scientific career
- Fields: malacology, geology

Étienne Alexandre Arnould Locard (8 December 1841 – 28 October 1904), usually known as Arnould Locard, was a French naturalist, malacologist and geologist. His name can be abbreviated/spelled as Arnoul at plates, for example Crosse (1890).

== Biography ==
Born in Lyon, he was the son of engineer Eugene Locard. He was a student at École Centrale Paris. He is considered one of the more prolific malacologists of the so-called "new school" with Jules René Bourguignat (1828–1892) as his master.

Locard is credited with describing hundreds of zoological species, in particular freshwater mussels and gastropods from the genus Helix. During his career he did very little collecting of specimens himself, preferring to work in an institution/museum environment. In 1895, he revised the conchological collection of Jacques Philippe Raymond Draparnaud (1772–1804).

Among his many publications are articles on the geology of the Lyon region, and treatises on fossil and living mollusks. He was the author of detailed biographies of naturalists, such as Martial Étienne Mulsant (1797–1880) and Gaspard Michaud (1795–1880), and also wrote an article on Lyonnaise malacologists, titled Malacologistes lyonnais (1879). In 1877 he published Malacologie Lyonnaise; ou Description des mollusques terrestres & aquatiques des environs de Lyons (1877), based on Ange Paulin Terver's collection of terrestrial and aquatic mollusks found in the vicinity of Lyon. In 1893 Philippe Thomas published the palaeontology results of the Tunisian Scientific Exploration Mission (1885–86) in six instalments plus an atlas, giving the work of Victor-Auguste Gauthier (sea urchins), Arnould Locard (Mollusca), Auguste Péron (Brachiopods, Bryozoa and Pentacrinitess) and Henri Émile Sauvage (fish).

Locard was a member of the Académie des sciences, belles-lettres et arts de Lyon (1879–1904), the Société française de malacologie, the Société géologique de France and the Société linnéenne de Lyon 1881–1904, president- 1882). He was a founding member of the Association lyonnaise des amis des sciences naturelles.

== Principal works ==
- 1881-1890. Contributions à la Faune malacologique française. Ann. Soc. linn. Lyon et Ann. Soc. Hist. nat. Agric. Arts utiles Lyon. regroupant 15 mémoires.
- 1884-1887. Matériaux pour servir à l'histoire de la Malacologie française. Bull. Soc. mal. Fr. Paris. regroupant 7 mémoires.
- 1884. Histoire des Mollusques dans l'Antiquite.
- 1888-1898. Notices conchyliologiques. L'Echange, Revue linnéenne, Lyon. rassemblant 50 mémoires.

== Taxa described ==
Taxa described by Arnould Locard include (sorted chronologically, gastropods and bivalves):

1882

- Cernuella aginnica (Locard, 1882)
- Helicella bolenensis (Locard, 1882)
- Chilostoma crombezi (Locard, 1882)
- Spiralix rayi (Locard, 1882)
- Urticicola isaricus (Locard, 1882)

1886

- Alvania simulans Locard, 1886
- Mitrella lanceolata (Locard, 1886)
- Nassarius ovoideus (Locard, 1886)
- Odostomia megerlei (Locard, 1886)
- Setia amabilis (Locard, 1886)

1889

- Mytilaster marioni (Locard, 1889)

1891

- Haedropleura forbesi Locard, 1891
- Pleurotomella reconditum (Locard, 1891)
- Raphitoma servaini (Locard, 1891)

1892

- Bela decussata (Locard, 1892)
- Bela oceanica (Locard, 1892)
- Bela zonata (Locard, 1892)
- Cerithiopsis scalaris (Locard, 1892)
- Emarginula tenera Locard, 1892
- Ondina crystallina Locard, 1892
- Peringiella elegans (Locard, 1892)
- Pollia scabra Locard, 1892
- Retusa candidula (Locard, 1892)

1893

- Dreissena anatolica Locard, 1893
- Dreissena gallandi Locard, 1893
- Dreissena siouffi Locard, 1893

1894

- Oxychilus colliourensis (Locard, 1894)

1896

- Calliostoma cleopatra (Locard, 1896)
- Kryptos koehleri (Locard, 1896)
- Mesalia flammifera (Locard, 1896)

1897

- Abyssochrysos eburneus (Locard, 1897)
- Amauropsis brassiculina (Locard, 1897)
- Bathybela nudator (Locard, 1897)
- Bathybela tenelluna (Locard, 1897)
- Bulla mabillei Locard, 1897
- Cadulus artatus Locard, 1897
- Cadulus monterosatoi Locard, 1897
- Clathurella salarium P. Fischer in Locard, 1897
- Coralliophila monterosatoi (Locard, 1897)
- Cylichnium africanum (Locard, 1897)
- Drilliola Locard, 1897
- Eulimella nana Locard, 1897
- Euthriostoma saharicum (Locard, 1897)
- Favartia bojadorensis (Locard, 1897)
- Fissidentalium semivestitum (Locard, 1897)
- Fusinus sectus (Locard, 1897)
- Gadila senegalensis (Locard, 1897)
- Gadila strangulata (Locard, 1897)
- Gibberula abyssicola Locard, 1897
- Granulina minusculina (Locard, 1897)
- Gregorioiscala pachya (Locard, 1897)
- Gymnobela abyssorum (Locard, 1897)
- Hexaplex saharicus (Locard, 1897)
- Inopinodon azoricus (Locard, 1897)
- Latiromitra Locard, 1897
- Latirus rugosissimus (Locard, 1897)
- Marginella marocana Locard, 1897
- Mitrella nitidulina (Locard, 1897)
- Modulus turbinoides (Locard, 1897)
- Oenopota graphica (Locard, 1897)
- Oliva flammulata dolicha Locard, 1897
- Pagodula cossmanni (Locard, 1897)
- Pedicularia decurvata Locard, 1897
- Periapta polygyrella (P. Fischer in Locard, 1897)
- Relichna simplex (Locard, 1897)
- Ringicula pirulina Locard, 1897
- Spirotropis monterosatoi (Locard, 1897)
- Stylopsis marioni Locard, 1897
- Timbellus leucas (Locard, 1897)
- Turbonilla atlantica (Locard, 1897)
- Turbonilla pauperata Locard, 1897
- Volvarina cernita (Locard, 1897)

1898

- Bathysciadium costulatum (Locard, 1898)
- Calliostoma milneedwardsi (Locard, 1898)
- Calliostoma obesulum (Locard, 1898)
- Capulus simplex Locard, 1898
- Cardiomya striolata (Locard, 1898)
- Cetoconcha transversa (Locard, 1898)
- Cuspidaria semirostrata Locard, 1898
- Emarginula elata Locard, 1898
- Emarginula intervecta Locard, 1898
- Gibbula corallioides Locard, 1898
- Halicardia carinifera (Locard, 1898)
- Hyalopecten parvulinus (Locard, 1898)
- Megaxinus appendiculatus (Locard, 1898)
- Nuculana vestita (Locard, 1898)
- Panacca africana (Locard, 1898)
- Policordia densicostata (Locard, 1898)
- Rhinoclama nitens (Locard, 1898)
- Solariella cingulima (Locard, 1898)
- Solariella effossima Locard, 1898
- Solariella mogadorensis (Locard, 1898)
- Solariella rudecta (Locard, 1898)
- Talochlamys abscondita (P. Fischer in Locard, 1898)
- Turcicula miranda (Locard, 1898)
- Vertambitus triangularis (Locard, 1898)
- Verticordia triangularis Locard, 1898

1899

- Planktomya prima (Locard, 1899)

1900

- Gibberula turgidula (Locard & Caziot, 1900)
- Mangelia difficilis (Locard & Caziot, 1900)
- Philbertia atropurpurea (Locard & Caziot, 1900)
- Raphitoma atropurpurea (Locard & Caziot, 1900)
- Raphitoma cylindracea (Locard & Caziot, 1900)

1902

- Bythinella padiraci Locard, 1902

== Named in honor ==
Taxa named in honor of Arnould Locard include:

- Aphanitoma locardi Bavay, 1906
- Panacca locardi (Dall, 1903)
