= Aphanitoma mariottinii =

Scientific classification
- Kingdom: Animalia
- Phylum: Mollusca
- Class: Gastropoda
- Subclass: Caenogastropoda
- Order: Neogastropoda
- Superfamily: Conoidea
- Family: Borsoniidae
- Genus: Aphanitoma
- Species: A. mariottinii

Binomial name
- Aphanitoma mariottinii Smriglio, Rufini & Martin Perez, 2001

Species of gastropod

Aphanitoma mariottinii is a species of sea snail, a marine gastropod mollusk in the family Borsoniidae.

== Distribution ==
This marine species occurs in the Alboran Sea, Western Mediterranean.
