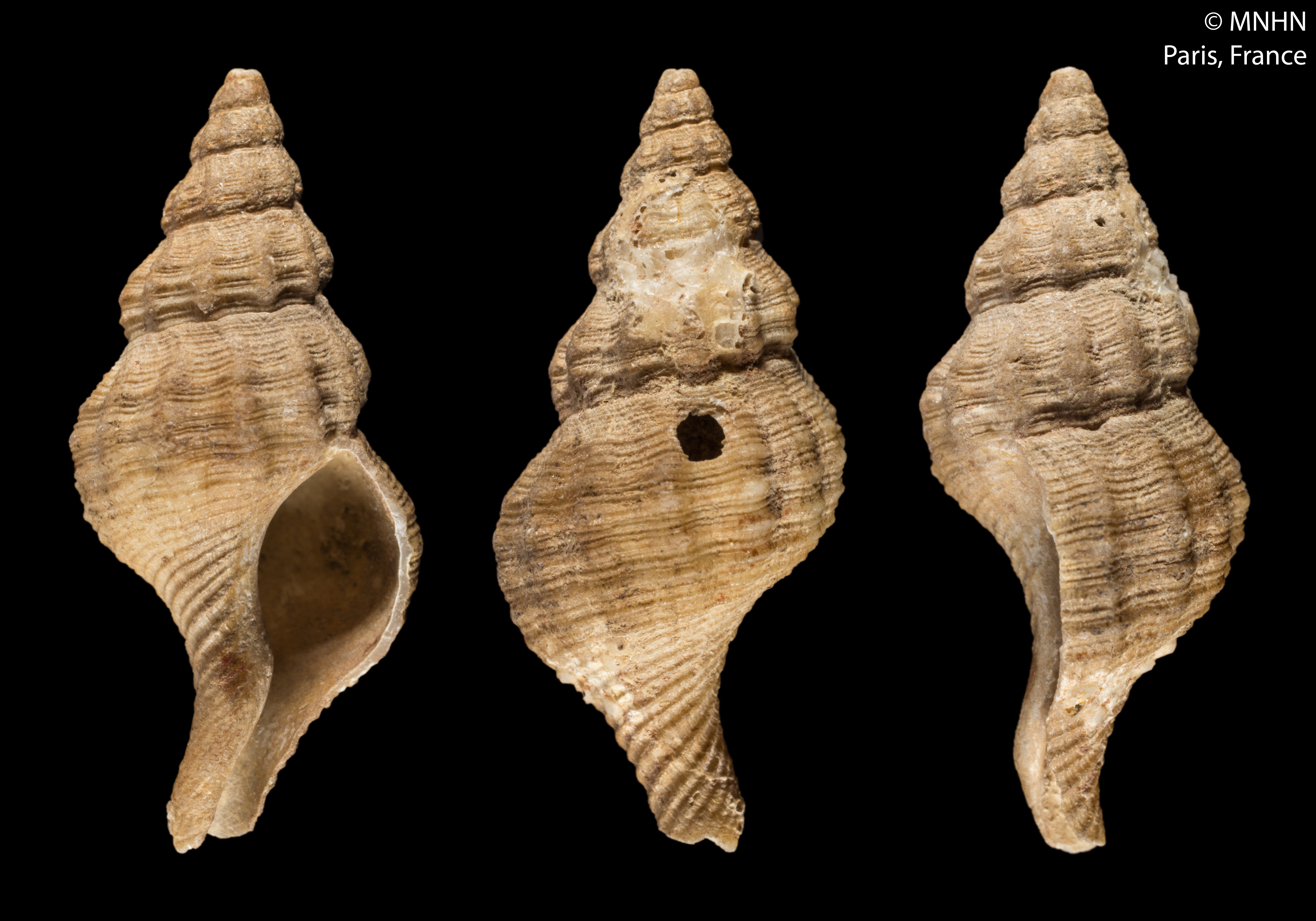
- Shell of Fusinus sectus (holotype at MNHN, Paris)

Scientific classification
- Kingdom: Animalia
- Phylum: Mollusca
- Class: Gastropoda
- Subclass: Caenogastropoda
- Order: Neogastropoda
- Family: Fasciolariidae
- Genus: Fusinus
- Species: F. sectus

Binomial name
- Fusinus sectus (Locard, 1897)

Synonyms
- Fusinus sectus var. minor F. Nordsieck, 1968; Fusus sectus Locard, 1897

= Fusinus sectus =

Species of gastropod

Fusinus sectus is a species of sea snail, a marine gastropod mollusc in the family Fasciolariidae, the spindle snails, the tulip snails and their allies.

== Description ==
The length of the shell attains 24.5 mm. Three views of a shell of Fusinus sectus, a marine gastropod species. Specimen from the collection of the Muséum national d'Histoire naturelle (MNHN), Paris, France.

== Distribution ==
This species occurs in the Atlantic Ocean off Western Sahara.
