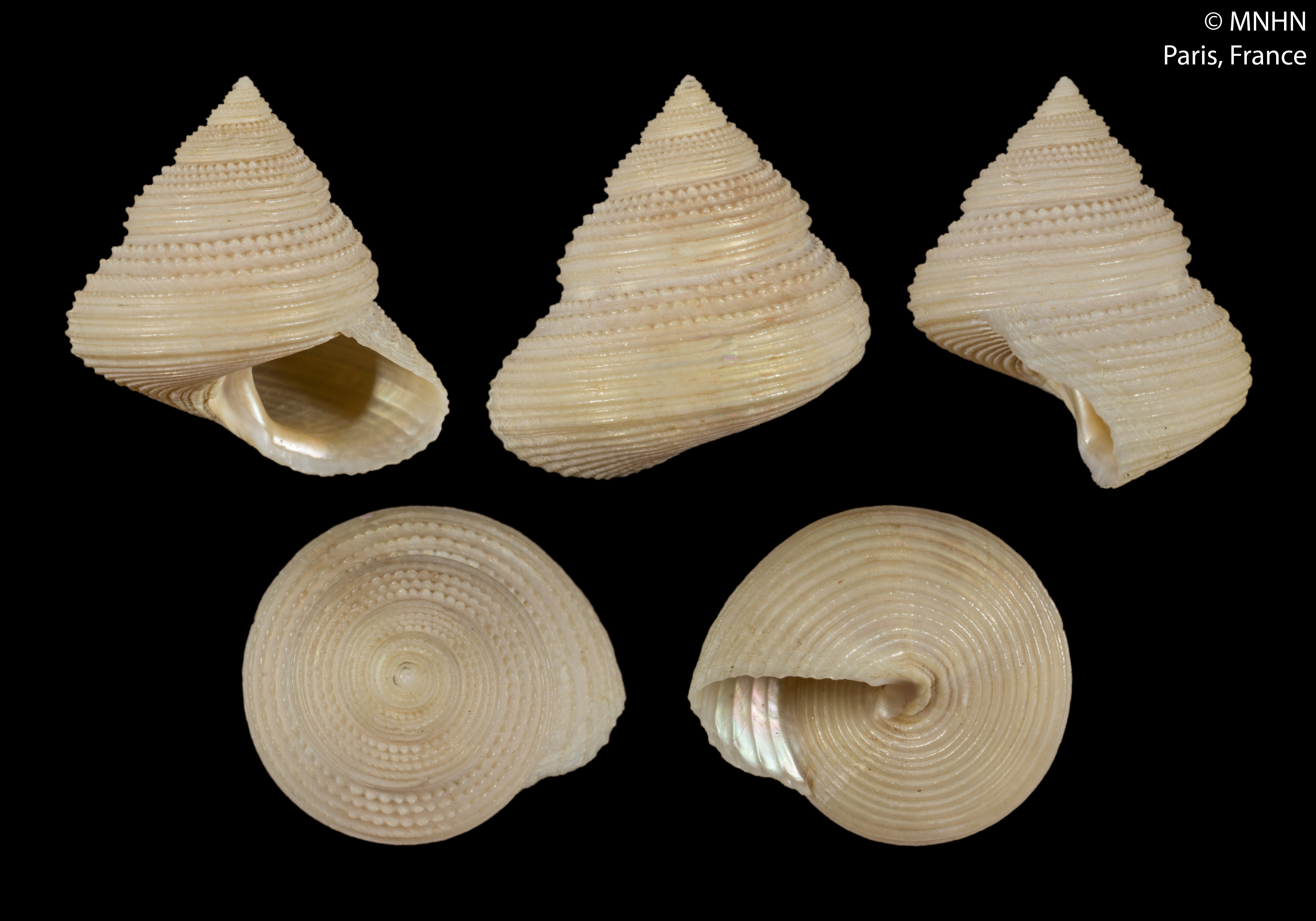
- Shell of Calliostoma cleopatra (syntype at MNHN, Paris)

Scientific classification
- Kingdom: Animalia
- Phylum: Mollusca
- Class: Gastropoda
- Subclass: Vetigastropoda
- Order: Trochida
- Family: Calliostomatidae
- Genus: Calliostoma
- Species: C. cleopatra

Binomial name
- Calliostoma cleopatra (Locard, 1896)

Synonyms
- Trochus cleopatra P. Fischer, 1883; Zizyphinus cleopatra Locard, 1896 (original combination)

= Calliostoma cleopatra =

Species of gastropod

Calliostoma cleopatra is a species of sea snail, a marine gastropod mollusk in the family Calliostomatidae.

== Distribution ==
This bathyal species occurs in the Atlantic Ocean off the Western Sahara and in the Bay of Biscay.
