= Xenodonta =

Scientific classification
- Kingdom: Animalia
- Phylum: Mollusca
- Class: Gastropoda
- Subclass: Vetigastropoda
- Family: Bathysciadiidae
- Genus: Xenodonta; Warén, 1993
- Species: X. bogasoni

Binomial name
- Xenodonta bogasoni Warén, 1993

Genus of gastropods

Xenodonta is a genus of sea snails, deep-sea limpets, marine gastropod mollusks in the family Bathysciadiidae.

== Species ==
Species within the genus Xenodonta include:

- Xenodonta bogasoni Warén, 1993

== Distribution ==
European waters
