= Peringiella denticulata =

Scientific classification
- Kingdom: Animalia
- Phylum: Mollusca
- Class: Gastropoda
- Subclass: Caenogastropoda
- Order: Littorinimorpha
- Family: Rissoidae
- Genus: Peringiella
- Species: P. denticulata

Binomial name
- Peringiella denticulata Ponder, 1985

Species of gastropod

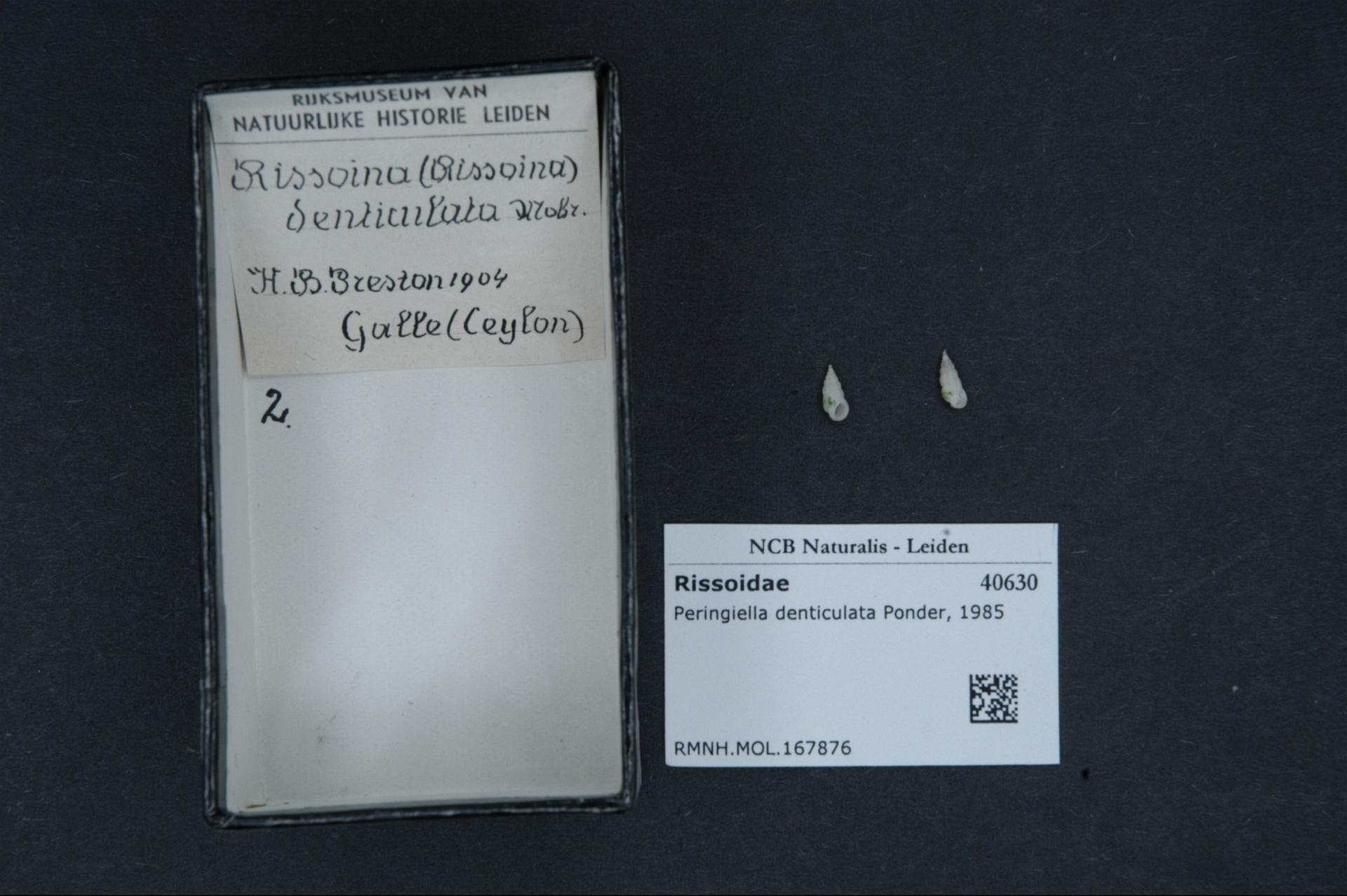
Peringiella denticulata from 1985

Peringiella denticulata is a species of minute sea snail, a marine gastropod mollusk or micromollusk in the family Rissoidae.

== Description ==
Peringiella denticulata possesses a white and yellow sheen and has a simple spiral shape; it tends retain the size of about 3 millimeters from top to bottom. Peringiella denticulata possesses vertical striations both inside and out.

== Distribution ==
In the North Atlantic Ocean, Peringiella denticulata is located in European waters (of the ERMS scope) and the Portuguese Exclusive Economic Zone. It is also found throughout the Spanish Exclusive Economic Zone.
