= Peringiella =

Scientific classification
- Kingdom: Animalia
- Phylum: Mollusca
- Class: Gastropoda
- Subclass: Caenogastropoda
- Order: Littorinimorpha
- Family: Rissoidae
- Genus: Peringiella; Monterosato, 1878

Genus of gastropods

Peringiella is a genus of minute sea snails, marine gastropod mollusks or micromollusks in the family Rissoidae.

== Species ==
Species within the genus Peringiella include:

- Peringiella denticulata Ponder, 1985
- Peringiella elegans (Locard, 1892)
