= Mangelia difficilis =

Scientific classification
- Kingdom: Animalia
- Phylum: Mollusca
- Class: Gastropoda
- Subclass: Caenogastropoda
- Order: Neogastropoda
- Superfamily: Conoidea
- Family: Mangeliidae
- Genus: Mangelia
- Species: M. difficilis

Binomial name
- Mangelia difficilis (Locard & Caziot, 1900)

Synonyms
- Mangilia difficilis Locard & Caziot, 1900 (original combination); Mangiliella difficilis (Locard & Caziot, 1900)

Species of gastropod

Mangelia difficilis is a species of sea snail, a marine gastropod mollusk in the family Mangeliidae.

== Description ==
The length of the shell attains 5 mm.

== Distribution ==
This marine species occurs in European waters off Corsica; Southern France and Northeast Spain.
