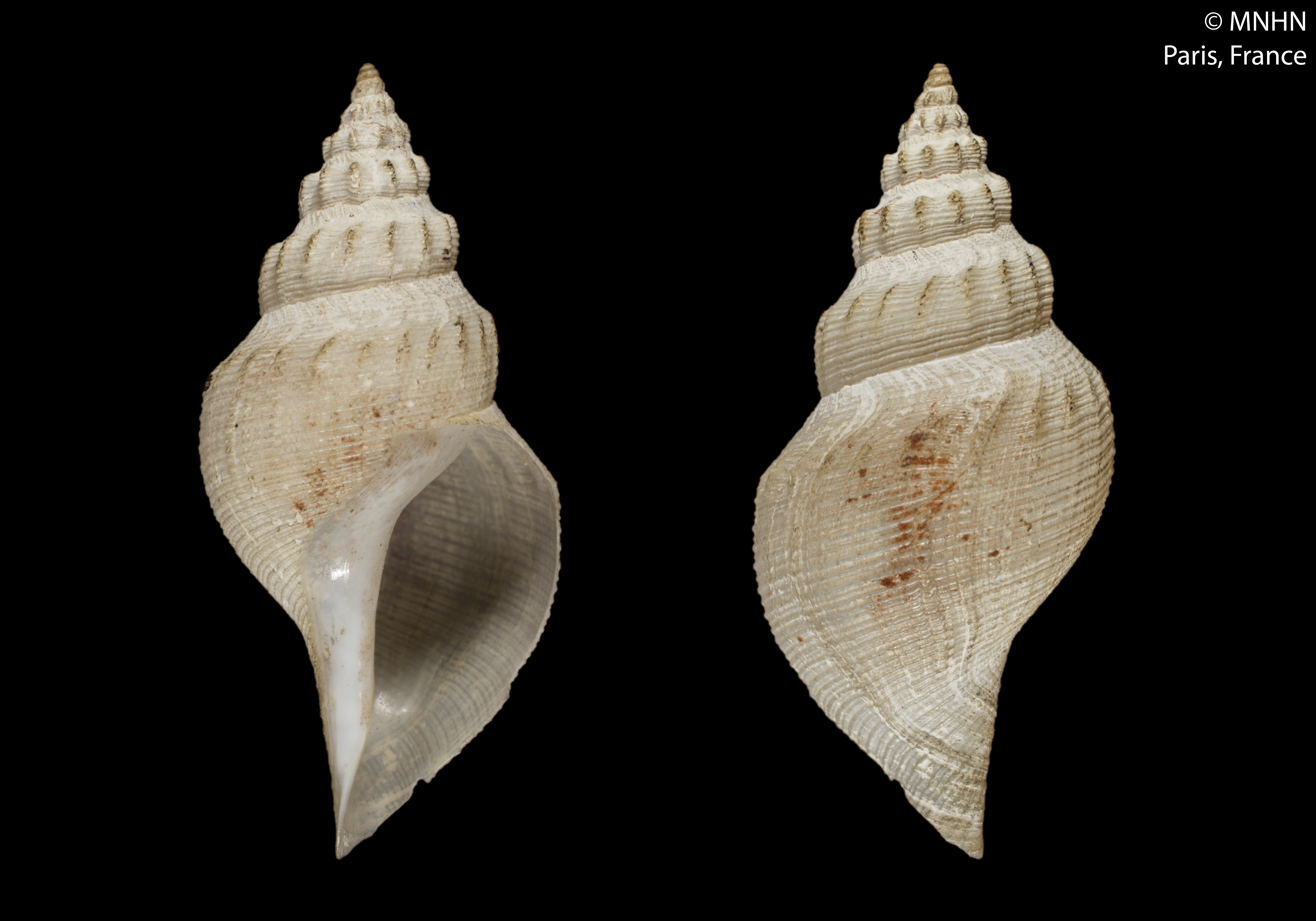

Scientific classification
- Kingdom: Animalia
- Phylum: Mollusca
- Class: Gastropoda
- Subclass: Caenogastropoda
- Order: Neogastropoda
- Superfamily: Conoidea
- Family: Raphitomidae
- Genus: Bathybela
- Species: B. tenelluna

Binomial name
- Bathybela tenelluna (Locard, 1897)

Synonyms
- Bathybela tenellunum [sic] (incorrect gender ending); Gymnobela tenelluna (Locard, 1897); Gymnobela tenellunum [sic] (incorrect gender ending); Pleurotoma tenellunum Locard, 1897 (original combination); Pleurotomella costlowi Petuch, 1974

= Bathybela tenelluna =

Species of gastropod

Bathybela tenelluna is a species of sea snail, a marine gastropod mollusk in the family Raphitomidae.

== Description ==
The shell attains a length of 55 mm.

== Distribution ==
This marine species occurs in the Atlantic Ocean off Western Sahara, the Azores, and North Carolina, USA.
