= Ange Paulin Terver =

French malacologist

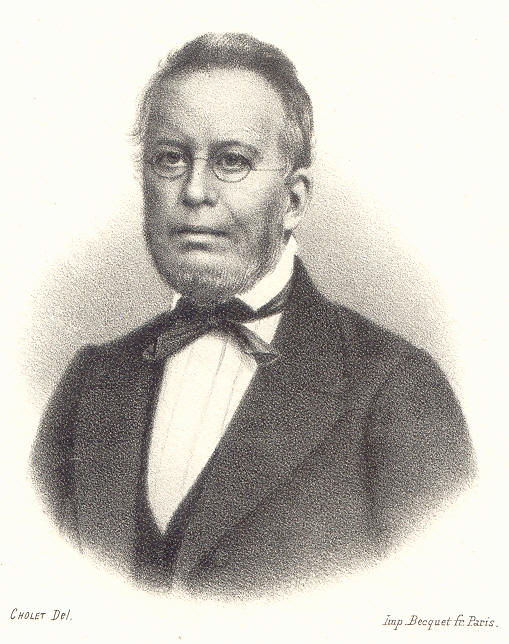
Ange Paulin Terver (1798–1875)

Ange Paulin Terver (4 October 1798, Lyon – 15 August 1875, Fontaines-sur-Saône) was a French malacologist.

He was a member of the Société linnéenne de Lyon, serving as curator of its zoological collections from 1849 to 1872. In 1853, he became a member of the Société d'agriculture de Lyon, and from 1853 to 1868, he served as secretary of the Commission des soies.

His collection of terrestrials and freshwater snails was purchased by the city of Marseille (Musée de Marseille), and his family donated his collection of 14000 coquilles to the Muséum de Lyon.

== Published works associated with Terver ==
- Lithographies XIV-XVI in Complément de l'Histoire naturelle des Mollusques terrestres et fluviatiles de la France par Gaspard Louis André Michaud, (1831).
- Catalogue des mollusques terrestres et fluviatiles, observés dans les possessions françaises au nord de l'Afrique (1839).
- Malacologie lyonnaise, ou, Description des mollusques terrestres & aquatiques des environs de Lyon : d'après la collection Ange-Paulin Terver, donnée au Museum de Lyon par la Famille Terver en 1876, published by Arnould Locard in 1877.
