= Volvarina cernita =

Scientific classification
- Kingdom: Animalia
- Phylum: Mollusca
- Class: Gastropoda
- Subclass: Caenogastropoda
- Order: Neogastropoda
- Family: Marginellidae
- Genus: Volvarina
- Species: V. cernita

Binomial name
- Volvarina cernita (Locard, 1897)

Species of gastropod

Volvarina cernita is a species of sea snail, a marine gastropod mollusk in the family Marginellidae, the margin snails.
