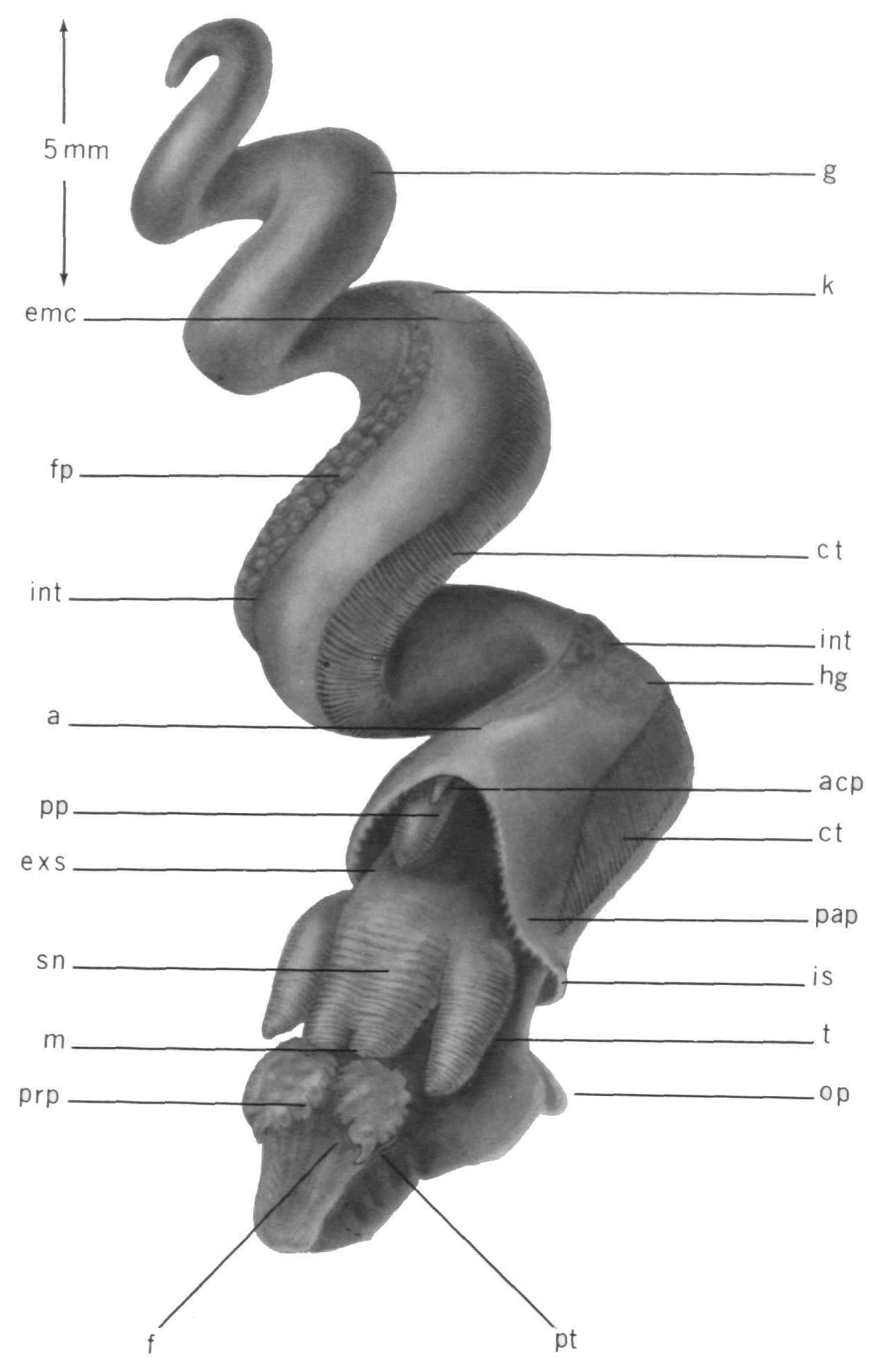
- anatomy of Abyssochrysos melanioides removed from the shell

Scientific classification
- Kingdom: Animalia
- Phylum: Mollusca
- Class: Gastropoda
- Subclass: Caenogastropoda
- Order: incertae sedis
- Family: Abyssochrysidae
- Genus: Abyssochrysos; Tomlin, 1927

Type species
- Abyssochrysos melanioides Tomlin, 1927

= Abyssochrysos =

Genus of gastropods

Abyssochrysos is a genus of bathyal sea snails, marine gastropod mollusks in the family Abyssochrysidae.

== Description ==
The characteristics (shell, radula and anatomy) of the species mark this genus as simple gastropods, unassigned in the clade Caenogastropoda. Their taenioglossate radula (formula: 2+1+1+1+2) is unique among the Prosobranchia because of the sickle-shaped rachidian tooth and the thick, sinuous, sharply cusped lateral teeth. They have tentacles but lack eyes. The mantle cavity goes deep (about 2½ whorls). The long, wide ctenidium is monopectinate. The pallial gonoducts are closed. The large penis-like organ is a right-dorsal mantle process.

== Species ==
Species within the genus Abyssochrysos include:

- Abyssochrysos bicinctus Bouchet, 1991
- † Abyssochrysos bituminifer (C. W. Cooke, 1919)
- Abyssochrysos brasilianus Bouchet, 1991
- † Abyssochrysos costatus (C. W. Cooke, 1919)
- Abyssochrysos eburneus Locard, 1897
- Abyssochrysos melanioides Tomlin, 1927
- Abyssochrysos melvilli Schepman, 1909
- Abyssochrysos xouthos Killeen & Oliver, 2000

Species brought into synonymy

- Abyssochrysos bicinctum (Bouchet), 1991: synonym of Abyssochrysos bicinctus (Bouchet, 1991)
- Abyssochrysos brasilianum (Bouchet), 1991: synonym of Abyssochrysos brasilianus (Bouchet, 1991)
- Abyssochrysos eburneum (Locard, 1897): synonym of Abyssochrysos eburneus (Locard, 1897)
- † Abyssochrysos giganteum Kiel, K. A. Campbell, Elder & C. Little, 2008: synonym of † Ascheria gigantea (Kiel, K. A. Campbell, Elder & C. Little, 2008) (original combination)
- Abyssochrysos tomlini Barnard, 1963: synonym of Abyssochrysos melvilli (Schepman, 1909)
