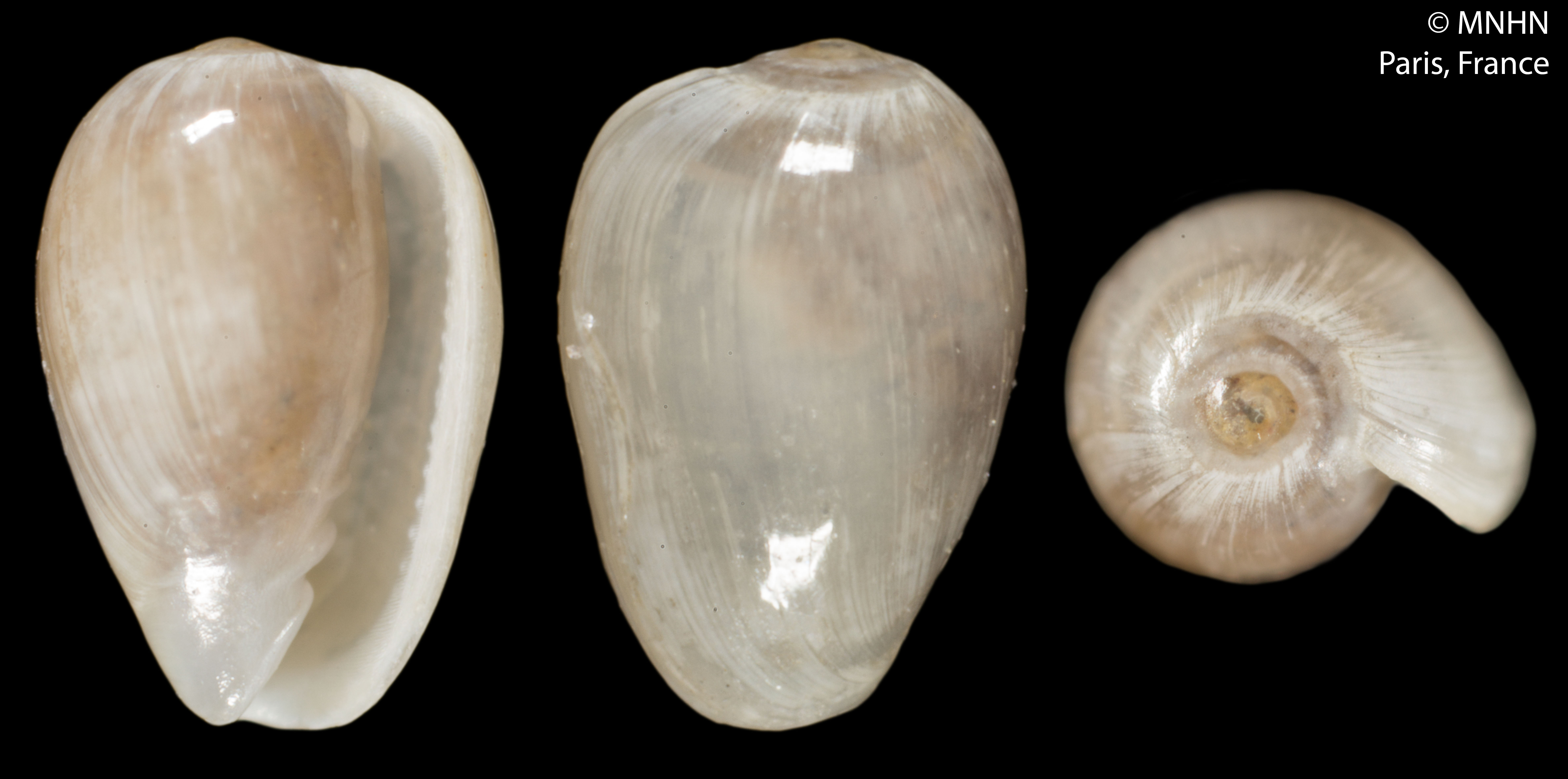

Scientific classification
- Kingdom: Animalia
- Phylum: Mollusca
- Class: Gastropoda
- Subclass: Caenogastropoda
- Order: Neogastropoda
- Family: Cystiscidae
- Subfamily: Cystiscinae
- Genus: Gibberula
- Species: G. turgidula

Binomial name
- Gibberula turgidula (Locard & Caziot, 1900)

Synonyms
- Gibberula turgidula Pallary, 1900 (deemed posterior to validation of the same name by Locard & Caziot, 1900); Gibberula turgidula var. minor Pallary, 1900; Marginella turgidula Locard & Caziot, 1900; Marginella turgidula var. minor Locard & Caziot, 1900

= Gibberula turgidula =

Species of gastropod

Gibberula turgidula is a species of very small sea snail, a marine gastropod mollusk or micromollusk in the family Cystiscidae.

== Distribution ==
This species occurs in the Mediterranean Sea off Sicily.
