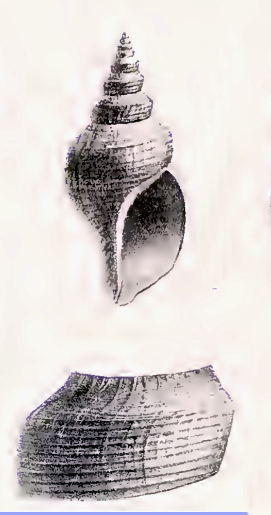
- Original image of a shell of Bathybela nudator

Scientific classification
- Kingdom: Animalia
- Phylum: Mollusca
- Class: Gastropoda
- Subclass: Caenogastropoda
- Order: Neogastropoda
- Superfamily: Conoidea
- Family: Raphitomidae
- Genus: Bathybela
- Species: B. nudator

Binomial name
- Bathybela nudator (Locard, 1897)

Synonyms
- Gymnobela nudator (Locard, 1897); Thesbia nudator Locard, 1897

= Bathybela nudator =

Species of gastropod

Bathybela nudator is a species of sea snail, a marine gastropod mollusk in the family Raphitomidae.

== Description ==
The average length of the shell measures 50 mm and its diameter 17 mm.

== Distribution ==
This species is found in the Atlantic Ocean off the Azores.
