= Bathysciadium =

Scientific classification
- Kingdom: Animalia
- Phylum: Mollusca
- Class: Gastropoda
- Subclass: Vetigastropoda
- Family: Bathysciadiidae
- Genus: Bathysciadium; Dautzenberg & H. Fischer, 1900

Genus of gastropods

Bathysciadium is a genus of sea snails, deep-sea limpets, marine gastropod mollusks in the family Bathysciadiidae.

== Species ==
Species within the genus Bathysciadium include:

- Bathysciadium concentricum Dall, 1927
- Bathysciadium costulatum (Locard, 1898)
- Bathysciadium pacificum Dall, 1908
- Bathysciadium rotundum (Dall, 1927)
- Bathysciadium xylophagum Warén & Carrozzza in Warén, 1997
