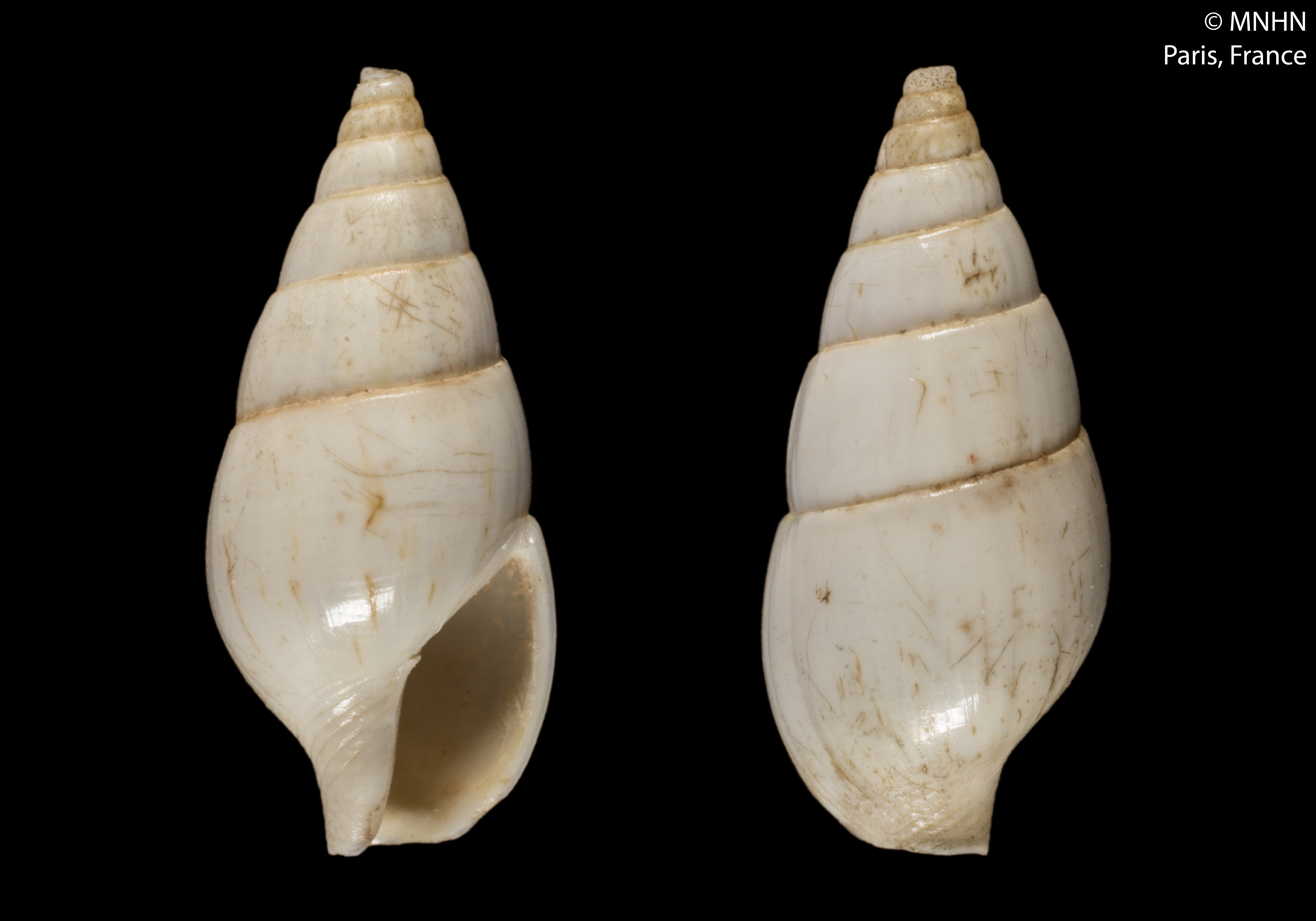
- Shell of Mitrella nitidulina (lectotype at MNHN, Paris)

Scientific classification
- Kingdom: Animalia
- Phylum: Mollusca
- Class: Gastropoda
- Subclass: Caenogastropoda
- Order: Neogastropoda
- Family: Columbellidae
- Genus: Mitrella
- Species: M. nitidulina

Binomial name
- Mitrella nitidulina (Locard, 1897)

Synonyms
- Columbella nitidulina Locard, 1897 (original combination)

= Mitrella nitidulina =

Species of gastropod

Mitrella nitidulina is a species of sea snail in the family Columbellidae, the dove snails.

== Description ==
The length of the shell attains 10.5 mm. It is smooth and white.

== Distribution ==
This species occurs in the Atlantic Ocean off the Western Sahara.
