= Cerithiopsis scalaris =

Scientific classification
- Kingdom: Animalia
- Phylum: Mollusca
- Class: Gastropoda
- Subclass: Caenogastropoda
- Order: incertae sedis
- Family: Cerithiopsidae
- Genus: Cerithiopsis
- Species: C. scalaris

Binomial name
- Cerithiopsis scalaris (Locard, 1892)

Species of gastropod

Cerithiopsis scalaris is a species of sea snail, a gastropod in the family Cerithiopsidae, which is known from European waters, including the Mediterranean Sea. It was described by Locard, in 1892.
