= Odostomia megerlei =

Scientific classification
- Kingdom: Animalia
- Phylum: Mollusca
- Class: Gastropoda
- Family: Pyramidellidae
- Genus: Odostomia
- Species: O. megerlei

Binomial name
- Odostomia megerlei (Locard, 1886)

Synonyms
- Odostomia glabrata Forbes & Hanley, 1850; Odostomia (Brachystomia) megerlei Locard, 1886

Species of gastropod

Odostomia megerlei is a species of sea snail, a marine gastropod mollusc in the family Pyramidellidae, the pyrams and their allies.

== Description ==
The shell grows to a length of 1.5 mm.

== Distribution ==
This species occurs in the following locations:

- European waters (ERMS scope)
- Portuguese Exclusive Economic Zone
- Spanish Exclusive Economic Zone
- United Kingdom Exclusive Economic Zone
- Mediterranean Sea
