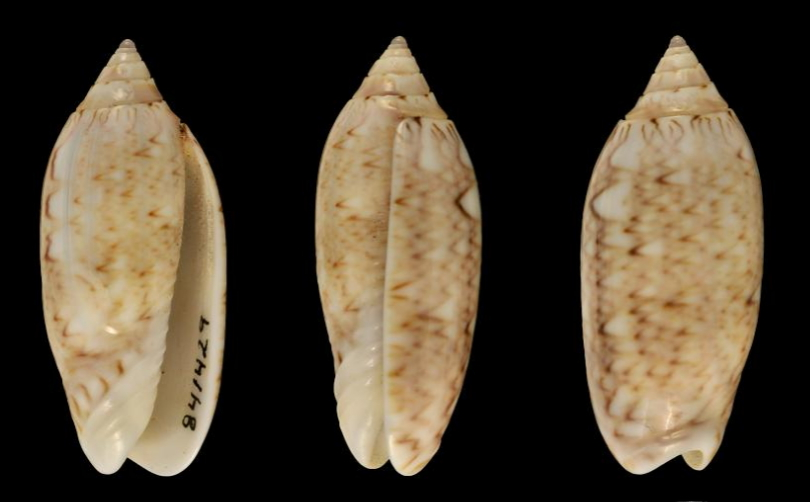
- Shell of Oliva flammulata dolicha (holotype at NMNH, Washington)

Scientific classification
- Kingdom: Animalia
- Phylum: Mollusca
- Class: Gastropoda
- Subclass: Caenogastropoda
- Order: Neogastropoda
- Family: Olividae
- Genus: Oliva
- Species: O. flammulata

Binomial name
- Oliva flammulata Lamarck, 1811

Synonyms
- Oliva (Oliva) aniomina Duclos, P.L., 1835; Oliva (Oliva) marmorea Marrat, F.P., 1871; Oliva (Oliva) siamensis Duclos, P.L., 1844; Oliva (Strephona) dolicha Locard, 1897

= Oliva flammulata =

Species of gastropod

Oliva flammulata, common name the flame olive, is a species of sea snail, a marine gastropod mollusk in the family Olividae, the olives.

== Subspecies ==
- Oliva flammulata dolicha Locard, 1897
- Oliva flammulata flammulata Lamarck, 1811

== Description ==
The length of the shell varies between 22 mm and 43 mm.

== Distribution ==
This species occurs in the Eastern Atlantic Ocean off the Cape Verdes, Mauritania and Angola, dredged 25-40 metres.
