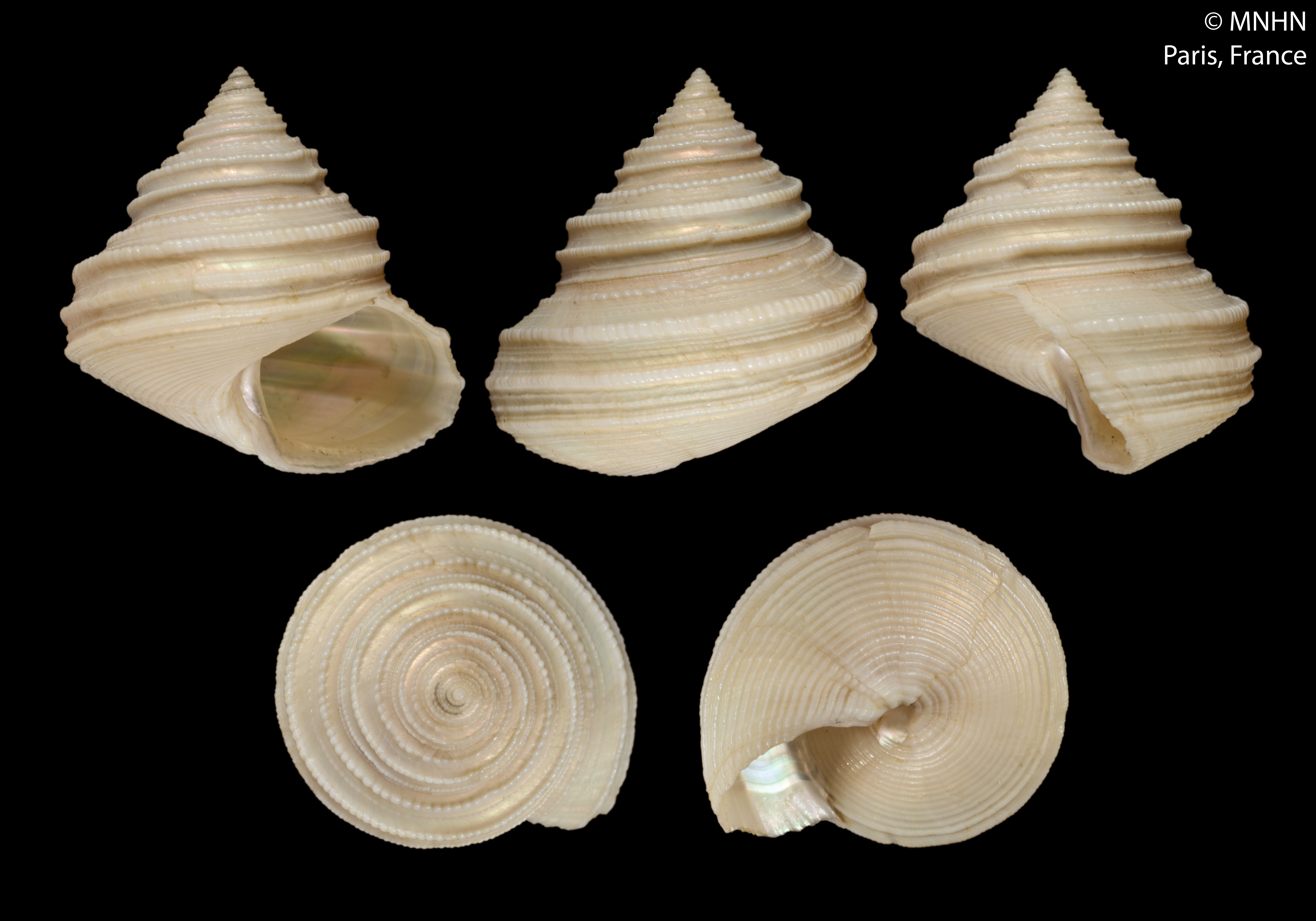
- Five views of a shell of Calliostoma milneedwardsi

Scientific classification
- Kingdom: Animalia
- Phylum: Mollusca
- Class: Gastropoda
- Subclass: Vetigastropoda
- Order: Trochida
- Family: Calliostomatidae
- Genus: Calliostoma
- Species: C. milneedwardsi

Binomial name
- Calliostoma milneedwardsi (Locard, 1898)

Synonyms
- Zizyphinus Milne-Edwardsi Locard, 1898 (original combination)

= Calliostoma milneedwardsi =

Species of gastropod

Calliostoma milneedwardsi is a species of sea snail, a marine gastropod mollusk in the family Calliostomatidae.

== Description ==
The height of the shell attains 44 mm.

== Distribution ==
This species occurs in the Atlantic Ocean off Mauritania.
