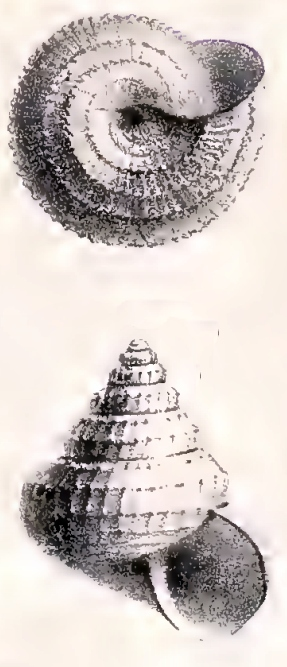
- Original drawing with two views of a shell of Calliotropis rudecta

Scientific classification
- Kingdom: Animalia
- Phylum: Mollusca
- Class: Gastropoda
- Subclass: Vetigastropoda
- Superfamily: Seguenzioidea
- Family: Calliotropidae
- Genus: Calliotropis
- Species: C. rudecta

Binomial name
- Calliotropis rudecta (Locard, 1898)

Synonyms
- Solariella rudecta Locard, 1898

= Calliotropis rudecta =

Species of gastropod

Calliotropis rudecta is a species of sea snail, a marine gastropod mollusk in the family Eucyclidae.

== Description ==
The height of the shell attains 5 mm.

== Distribution ==
This species occurs in the Atlantic Ocean off Morocco.
