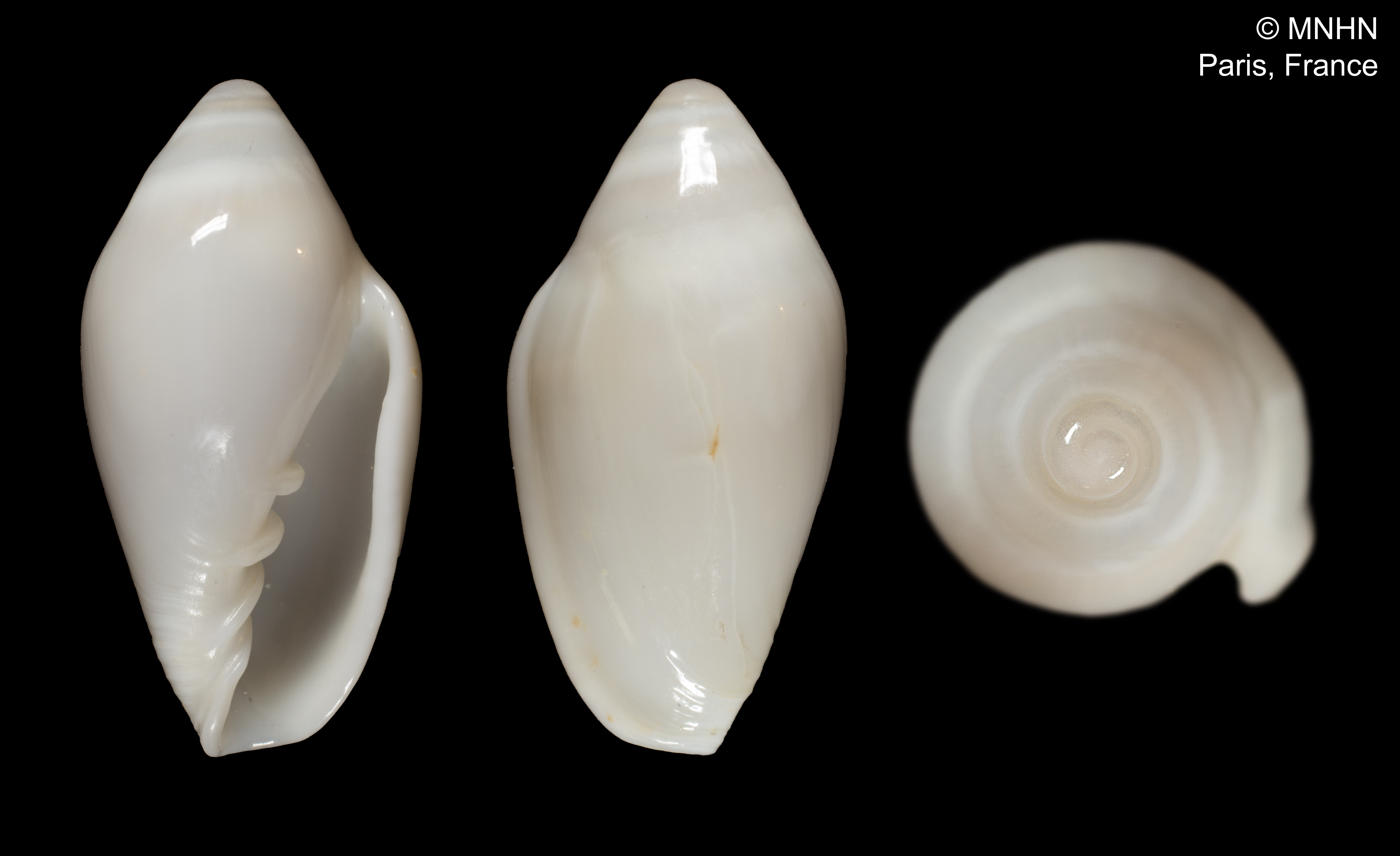
- Shell of Marginella marocana (lectotype at MNHN, Paris)

Scientific classification
- Kingdom: Animalia
- Phylum: Mollusca
- Class: Gastropoda
- Subclass: Caenogastropoda
- Order: Neogastropoda
- Family: Marginellidae
- Subfamily: Marginellinae
- Genus: Marginella
- Species: M. marocana

Binomial name
- Marginella marocana Locard, 1897

Synonyms
- Dentimargo marocana (Locard, 1897); Marginella (Afriamarginella) marocana Locard, 1897· accepted, alternate representation; Marginella marocana var. curta Locard, 1897; Marginella marocana var. elongata Locard, 1897

= Marginella marocana =

Species of gastropod

Marginella marocana is a species of sea snail, a marine gastropod mollusk in the family Marginellidae, the margin snails.

== Distribution ==
This marine species occurs off the Canary Islands.
