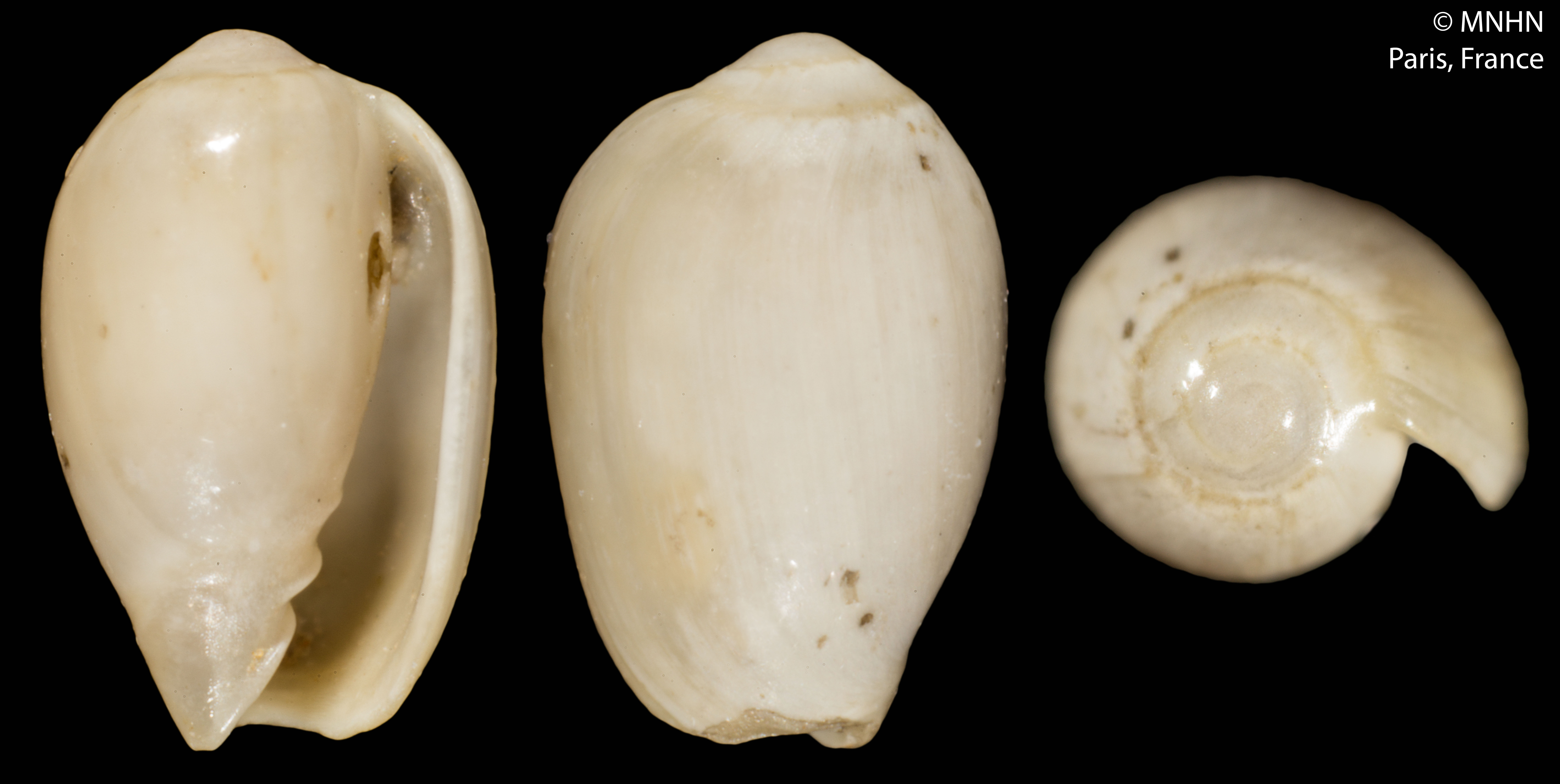

Scientific classification
- Kingdom: Animalia
- Phylum: Mollusca
- Class: Gastropoda
- Subclass: Caenogastropoda
- Order: Neogastropoda
- Family: Cystiscidae
- Subfamily: Cystiscinae
- Genus: Gibberula
- Species: G. abyssicola

Binomial name
- Gibberula abyssicola Monterosato in Locard, 1897

Synonyms
- Gibberula monterosatoi Locard, 1897; Gibberula retusa Locard, 1897

= Gibberula abyssicola =

Species of gastropod

Gibberula abyssicola is a species of very small sea snail, a marine gastropod mollusk or micromollusk in the family Cystiscidae.

== Description ==
The length of the shell attains 3.2 mm.

== Distribution ==
This species occurs in the Atlantic Ocean off Morocco; also in the Bay of Biscay.
