= Pilus (gastropod) =

Scientific classification
- Kingdom: Animalia
- Phylum: Mollusca
- Class: Gastropoda
- Subclass: Vetigastropoda
- Family: Bathysciadiidae
- Genus: Pilus; Warén, 1991

Type species
- Cocculina conica A. E. Verrill, 1884

Genus of gastropods

Pilus is a genus of sea snails, marine gastropod mollusks in the family Bathysciadiidae.

== Species ==
Species within the genus Pilus include:

- Pilus conicus (Verrill, 1884)
