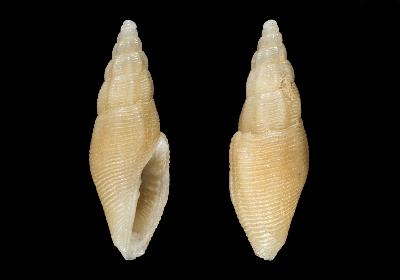
- Shell of Aphanitoma locardi

Scientific classification
- Kingdom: Animalia
- Phylum: Mollusca
- Class: Gastropoda
- Subclass: Caenogastropoda
- Order: Neogastropoda
- Superfamily: Conoidea
- Family: Borsoniidae
- Genus: Aphanitoma; Bellardi, 1875

Type species
- † Turbinella labellum Bellardi & Michelotti, 1840

= Aphanitoma =

Genus of gastropods

Aphanitoma is a genus of sea snails, marine gastropod mollusks in the family Borsoniidae.

== Description ==
The shell has a fusiform shape. The sinus is scarcely apparent. The biplicate columella is nearly straight. The canal is rather short and slightly curved.

(Original description in Latin) The shell exhibits a fusiform shape. The body whorl is slightly depressed anteriorly. The outer lip is essentially linear, exhibiting minimal sinuosity. In adult and intact specimens, it displays a barely perceptible emargination near the posterior suture. The columella is nearly straight, showing two prominent folds that descend along its central portion. The posterior fold is more pronounced than the anterior. Both folds diminish in size within the aperture. The siphonal canal is notably short and exhibits a sinistral curvature.

== Species ==
Species within the genus Aphanitoma include:

- † Aphanitoma alterans F. Nordsieck, 1972
- † Aphanitoma aplicata Vera-Peláez, 2002
- † Aphanitoma arctata Bellardi, 1877
- † Aphanitoma bellardii G. Seguenza, 1880
- † Aphanitoma breviata Bellardi, 1877
- † Aphanitoma fransi A. W. Janssen, 1972
- † Aphanitoma imperati (Scacchi, 1835)
- † Aphanitoma labellum (Bellardi & Michelotti, 1840)
- Aphanitoma locardi Bavay, 1906
- † Aphanitoma marginata (F. Nordsieck, 1972)
- Aphanitoma mariottinii Smriglio, Rufini & Martin Perez, 2001
- † Aphanitoma marqueti Ceulemans, Van Dingenen & Landau, 2018
- † Aphanitoma pecchiolii Bellardi, 1877
- † Aphanitoma pliocenica Vera-Peláez, 2002
- † Aphanitoma pluriplicata Bellardi, 1877
- † Aphanitoma roesti Landau, Van Dingenen & Ceulemans, 2020
- † Aphanitoma ronaldi A. W. Janssen, 1972
- † Aphanitoma targioniana (D'Ancona, 1873) : a little known species from the bathyal malacofauna of the upper Pliocene from Romagna (N-Italy)

Synonyms

- † Aphanitoma elegans (D'Ancona, 1872): synonym of † Aphanitoma pliocenica Vera-Peláez, 2002 (senior synonym of A. pliocenica but invalid junior homonym of Turbinella elegans)
- † Aphanitoma protoconcha F. Nordsieck, 1972: synonym of † Aphanitoma alterans F. Nordsieck, 1972
- † Aphanitoma quadricincta Cossmann, 1883: synonym of † Endiatoma quadricincta (Cossmann, 1883) (superseded combination)
