= Peringiella elegans =

Scientific classification
- Kingdom: Animalia
- Phylum: Mollusca
- Class: Gastropoda
- Subclass: Caenogastropoda
- Order: Littorinimorpha
- Family: Rissoidae
- Genus: Peringiella
- Species: P. elegans

Binomial name
- Peringiella elegans (Locard, 1892)

Synonyms
- Cingula elegans Locard, 1892; Cingula nitida

Species of gastropod

Peringiella elegans is a species of small sea snail, a marine gastropod mollusk or micromollusk in the family Rissoidae.
