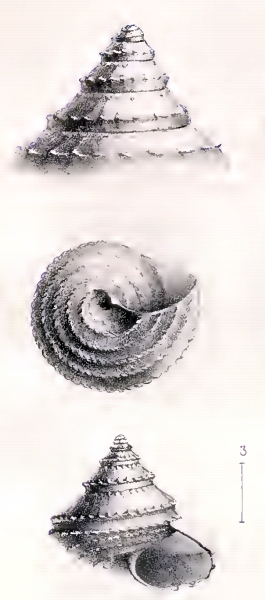
- Original drawing with three views of a shell of Calliotropis mogadorensis

Scientific classification
- Kingdom: Animalia
- Phylum: Mollusca
- Class: Gastropoda
- Subclass: Vetigastropoda
- Superfamily: Seguenzioidea
- Family: Calliotropidae
- Genus: Calliotropis
- Species: C. mogadorensis

Binomial name
- Calliotropis mogadorensis (Locard, 1898)

Synonyms
- Solariella mogadorensis Locard, 1898 (original combination)

= Calliotropis mogadorensis =

Species of gastropod

Calliotropis mogadorensis is a species of sea snail, a marine gastropod mollusk in the family Eucyclidae.

== Description ==
The height of the shell attains 13 mm.

== Distribution ==
This species occurs in the Atlantic Ocean off Morocco at depths between 912 m and 1,900 m.
