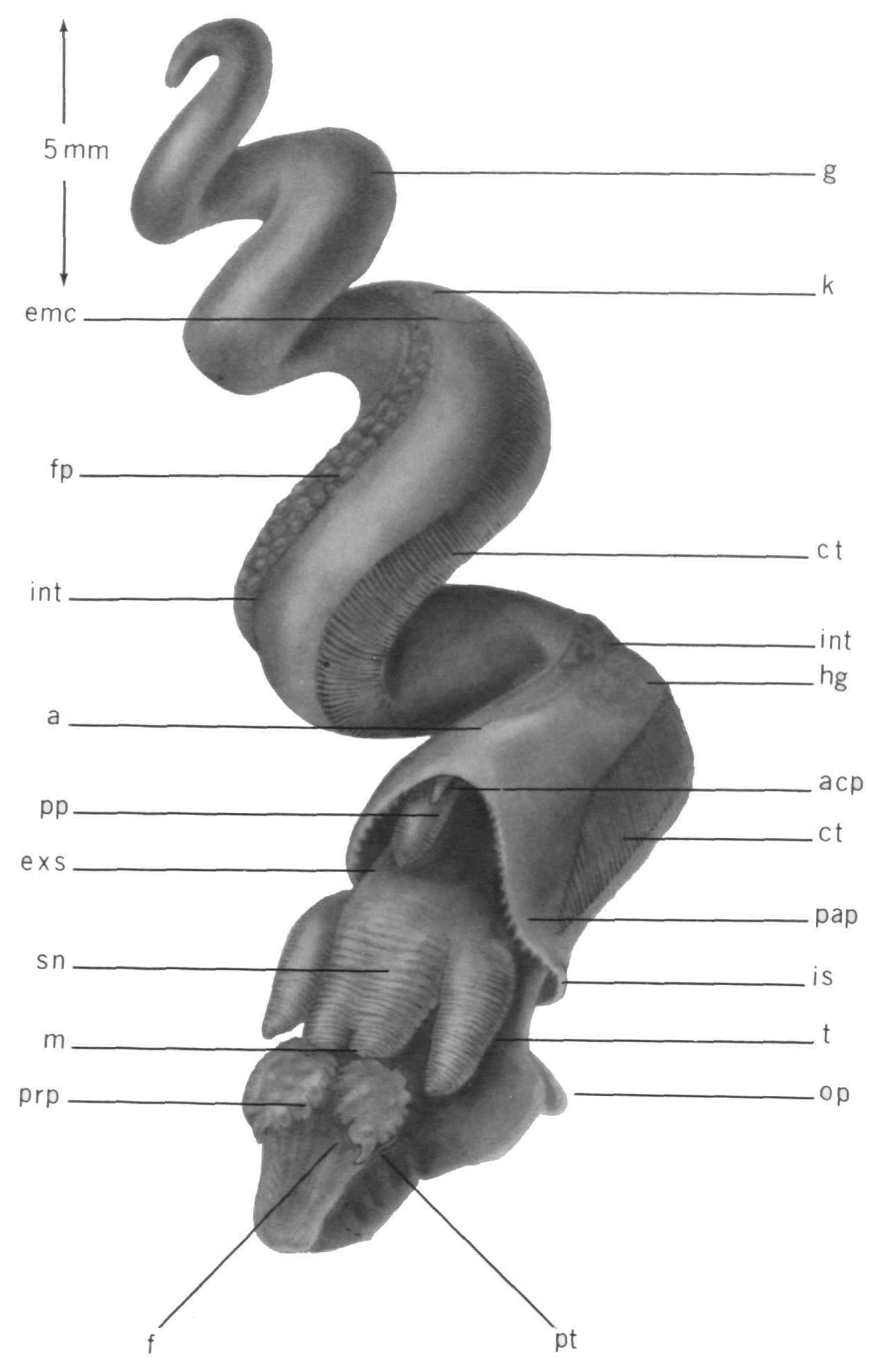
- anatomy of Abyssochrysos melanioides removed from the shell

Scientific classification
- Kingdom: Animalia
- Phylum: Mollusca
- Class: Gastropoda
- Subclass: Caenogastropoda
- Order: incertae sedis
- Family: Abyssochrysidae
- Genus: Abyssochrysos
- Species: A. melanioides

Binomial name
- Abyssochrysos melanioides Tomlin, 1927

= Abyssochrysos melanioides =

Species of gastropod

Abyssochrysos melanioides is a species of sea snail, a marine gastropod mollusk in the family Abyssochrysidae.

This is the type specimen for which Tomlin created a new family Abyssochrisidae, but couldn't refer at the time to any superfamily. Some years later he thought it had any affinities with the families Littorinidae Children, 1834 and Thiaridae Gill, 1871 (1823). Houbrick (1979) brought the then known species of Abyssochrysos in the superfamily Loxonematacea Koken, with close affinities to the families Zygopleuridae Wenz, 1939, Paleozygopleuridae Horny, and Pseudozygopleuridae (Knight, 1930).

== Distribution ==
- The type specimen was dredged from a depth of 1,645 to 1,828 metres (5,397 to 5,997 ft) off the Cape of Good Hope, South Africa.
- Philippines
- Indonesia

== Description ==
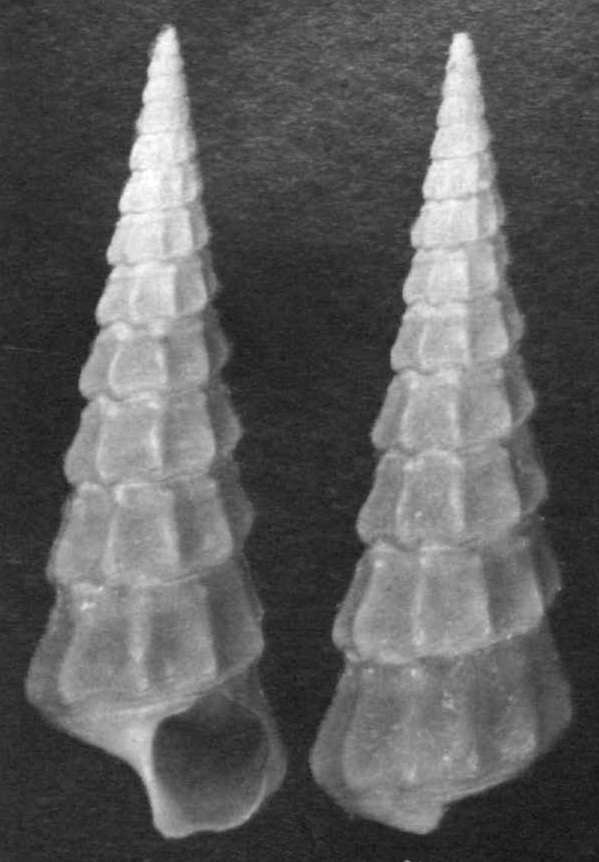
shell

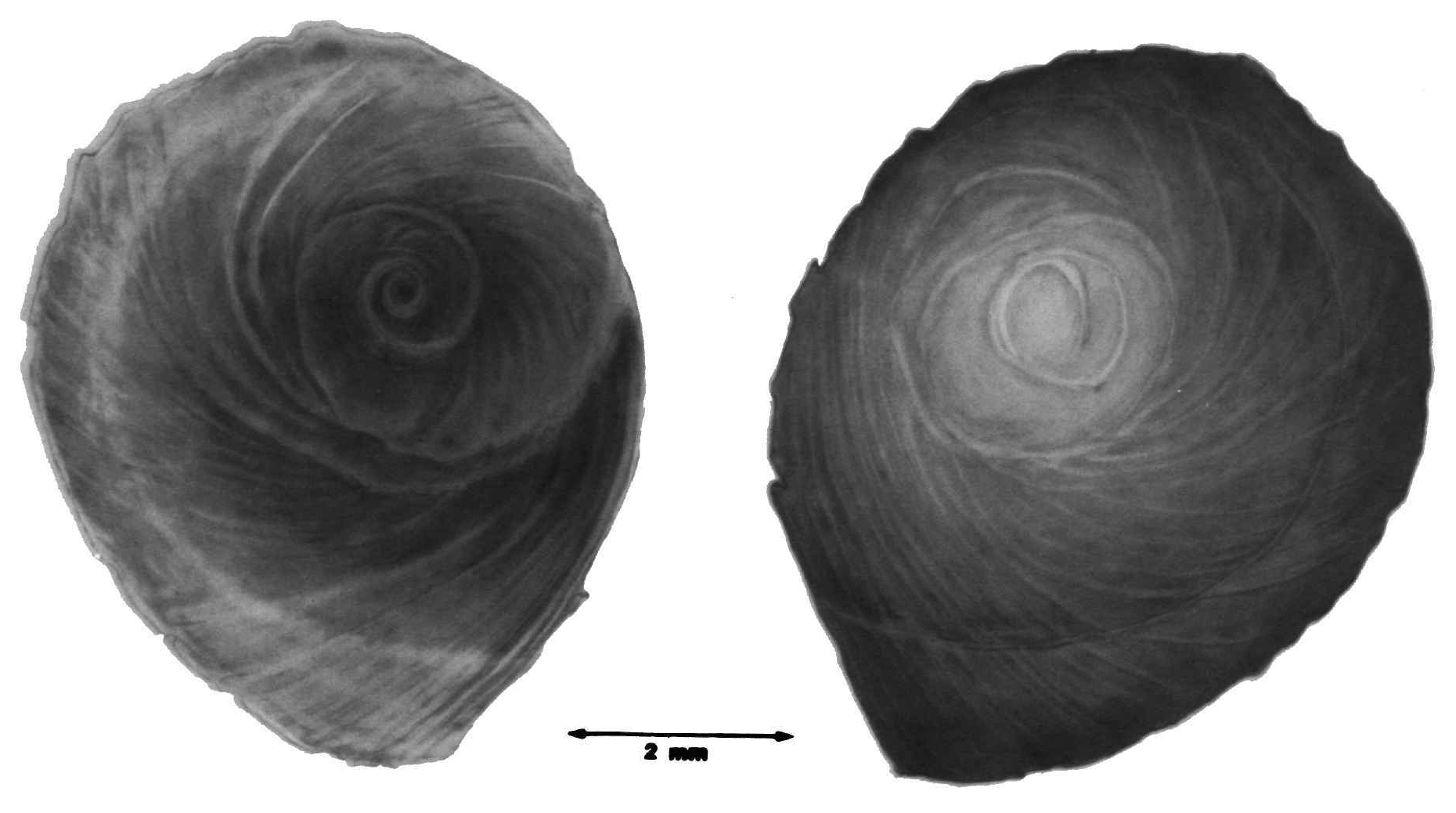
operculum

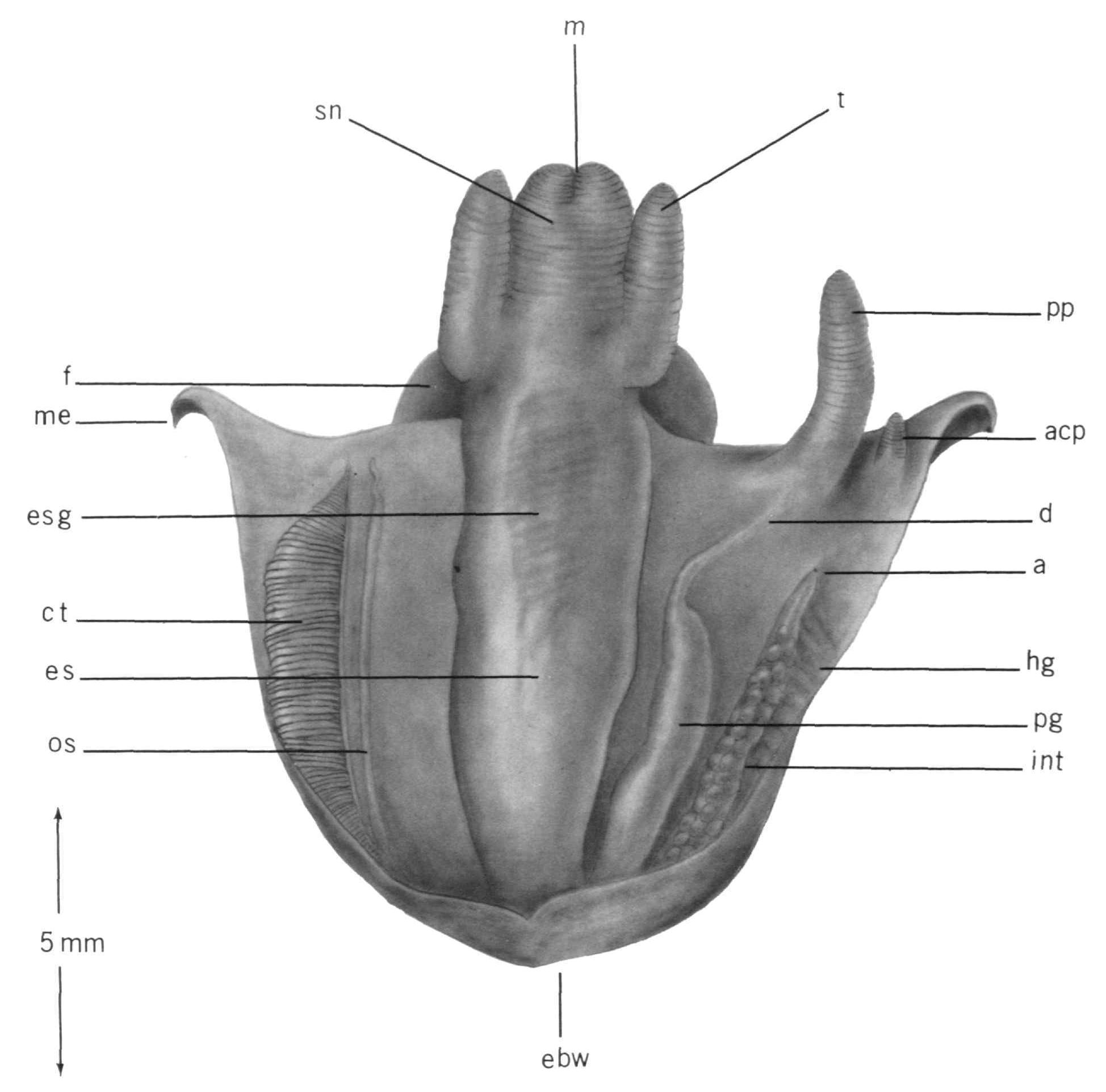
anatomy

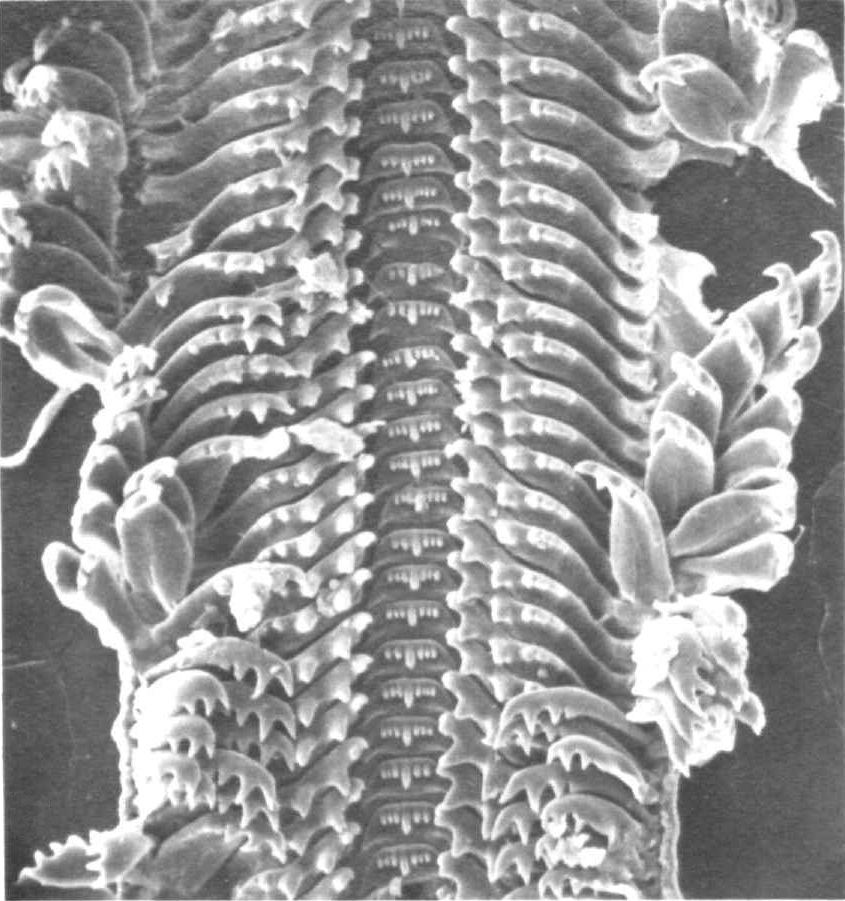
radula
