= Bathybela papyracea =

Scientific classification
- Kingdom: Animalia
- Phylum: Mollusca
- Class: Gastropoda
- Subclass: Caenogastropoda
- Order: Neogastropoda
- Superfamily: Conoidea
- Family: Raphitomidae
- Genus: Bathybela
- Species: B. papyracea

Binomial name
- Bathybela papyracea Waren & Bouchet, 2001

Species of gastropod

Bathybela papyracea is a species of sea snail, a marine gastropod mollusk in the family Raphitomidae.

== Distribution ==
This marine species occurs at seeps in the Mid America Trench at a depth of 3,660 m.
