= Raphitoma oblonga =

Scientific classification
- Kingdom: Animalia
- Phylum: Mollusca
- Class: Gastropoda
- Subclass: Caenogastropoda
- Order: Neogastropoda
- Superfamily: Conoidea
- Family: Raphitomidae
- Genus: Raphitoma
- Species: R. oblonga

Binomial name
- Raphitoma oblonga (Jeffreys, 1867)

Synonyms
- Clathurella bucquoyi Locard, 1886; Clathurella purpurea var. denseclathrata Dautzenberg & Durouchoux, 1913; Clathurella servaini Locard, 1891; Defrancia purpurea var. oblonga Jeffreys, 1867 (basionym); Raphitoma servaini (Locard, 1891)

Species of gastropod

Raphitoma oblonga is a species of sea snail, a marine gastropod mollusk in the family Raphitomidae.

== Description ==
The length varies between 12 mm and 14 mm, and its diameter is between 5 mm and 5.5 mm.

The shell has a fusiform shape and a rather high acuminate spire. The body whorl is bulbous. The whorls are covered with regular longitudinal ribs forming small reticulations when crossed by the spiral riblets. The aperture is oblong. The short siphonal canal is slightly bent. The ground color of the shell is dark brown, sometimes with white spots.

== Distribution ==
This marine species occurs in the English Channel.
