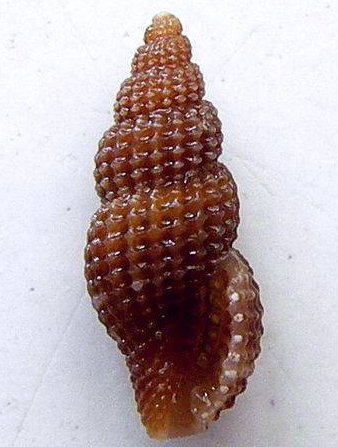
- Shell of Raphitoma atropurpurea

Scientific classification
- Kingdom: Animalia
- Phylum: Mollusca
- Class: Gastropoda
- Subclass: Caenogastropoda
- Order: Neogastropoda
- Superfamily: Conoidea
- Family: Raphitomidae
- Genus: Raphitoma
- Species: R. atropurpurea

Binomial name
- Raphitoma atropurpurea (Locard & Caziot, 1900)

Synonyms
- Clathurella atropurpurea Locard & Caziot, 1900; Philbertia atropurpurea (Locard & Caziot, 1900)

= Raphitoma atropurpurea =

Species of mollusc

Raphitoma atropurpurea is a species of sea snail, a marine gastropod mollusk in the family Raphitomidae.

== Description ==
The length of the shell varies between 6 mm (0.24 in) and 15 mm (0.59 in).

The monochrome dark brown shell has a somewhat elongated, fusiform shape. The spire is long but not very acuminate. The shell contains 10 convex whorls, separated by a rather impressed suture. The body whorl is rounded and is attenuated progressively downwards. The whorls show narrow, close, prominent ribs intersected by decurrent, narrow, prominent, regular and continual striae, forming a regular reticulation.

== Distribution ==
This marine species occurs in the Mediterranean Sea off Southern France and Corsica.
