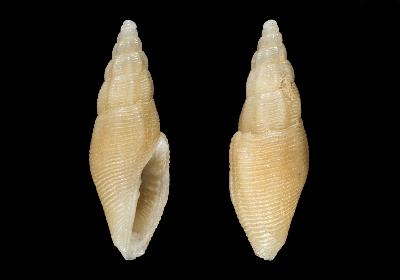
- Shell of Aphanitoma locardi (holotype in the MNHN, Paris)

Scientific classification
- Kingdom: Animalia
- Phylum: Mollusca
- Class: Gastropoda
- Subclass: Caenogastropoda
- Order: Neogastropoda
- Superfamily: Conoidea
- Family: Borsoniidae
- Genus: Aphanitoma
- Species: A. locardi

Binomial name
- Aphanitoma locardi Bavay, 1906

Synonyms
- Mitra biconica Sykes, 1911 (homonym of Mitra biconica Whitfield, 1865); Turris locardi A.R.J.B. Bavay, 1906

= Aphanitoma locardi =

Species of gastropod

Aphanitoma locardi is a species of sea snail, a marine gastropod mollusk in the family Borsoniidae.

== Description ==
The height of the shell attains 11 mm. It is often a light brown color and shaped like a cone with a swirling pattern on the top.

== Distribution ==
This marine species occurs off Western Morocco and southwestern Portugal.
