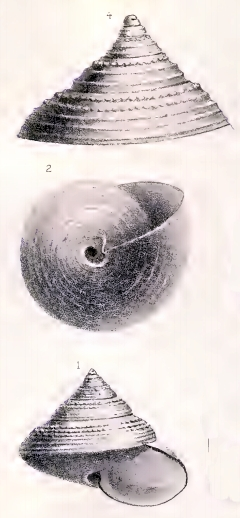
- Illustration of Calliostoma maurolici

Scientific classification
- Kingdom: Animalia
- Phylum: Mollusca
- Class: Gastropoda
- Subclass: Vetigastropoda
- Order: Trochida
- Superfamily: Trochoidea
- Family: Calliostomatidae
- Subfamily: Calliostomatinae
- Genus: Calliostoma
- Species: C. maurolici

Binomial name
- Calliostoma maurolici (G. Seguenza, 1876)

Synonyms
- Calliostoma obesulum (Locard, 1898); Gibbula maurolici (G. Seguenza, 1876); Gibbula obesula Locard, 1898; Trochus (Zizyphinus) maurolici G. Seguenza, 1876

= Calliostoma maurolici =

Species of gastropod

Calliostoma maurolici is a species of sea snail, a marine gastropod mollusk, in the family Calliostomatidae within the superfamily Trochoidea, the top snails, turban snails and their allies.

== Description ==
The length of the shell attains 13 mm.

== Distribution ==
This species occurs in the Atlantic Ocean off Morocco and on the Mid-Atlantic Ridge; also on the Galicia Bank, Northeast Atlantic Ocean.
