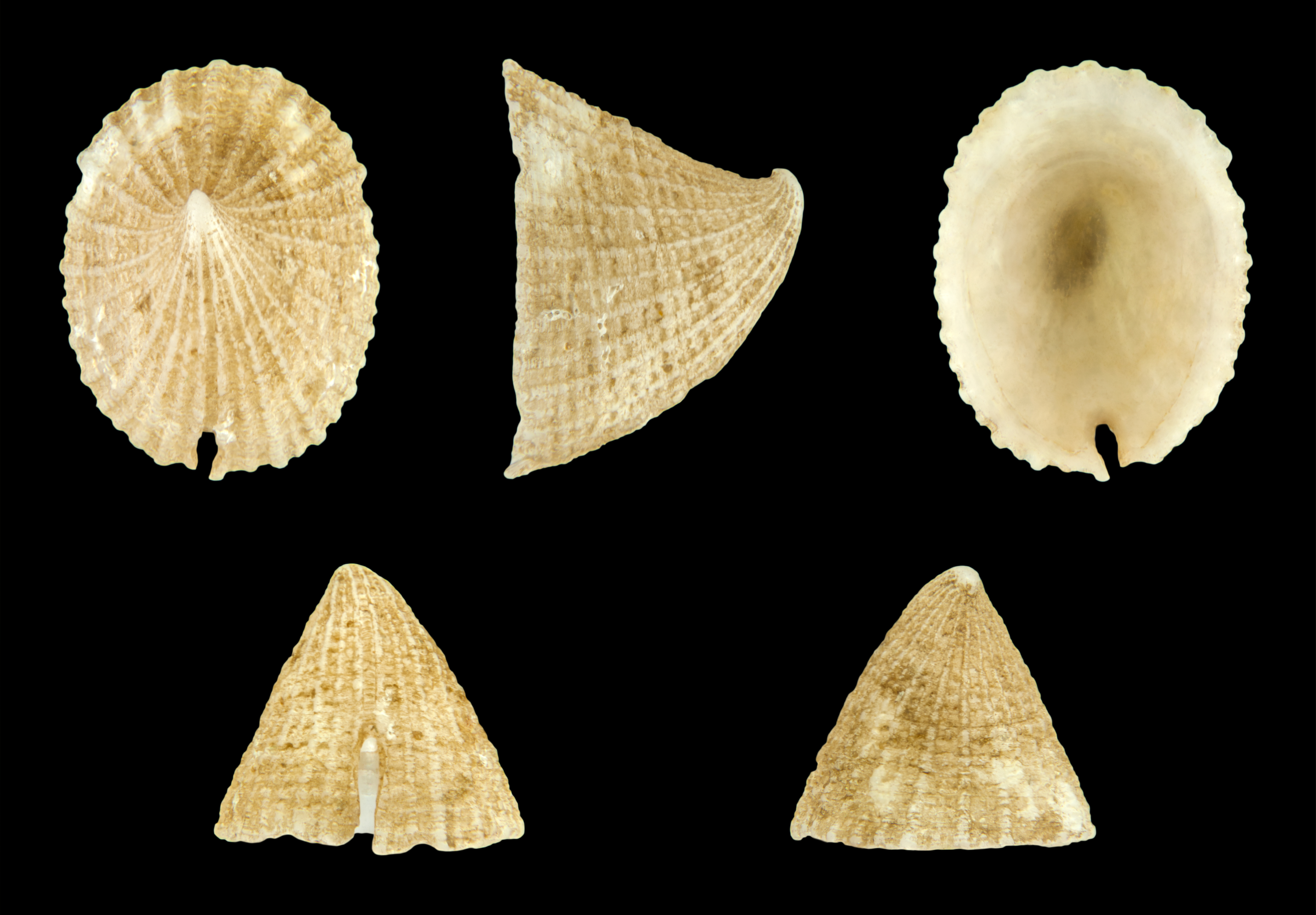

Scientific classification
- Kingdom: Animalia
- Phylum: Mollusca
- Class: Gastropoda
- Subclass: Vetigastropoda
- Order: Lepetellida
- Family: Fissurellidae
- Genus: Emarginula
- Species: E. fissura

Binomial name
- Emarginula fissura (Linnaeus, 1758)

Synonyms
- Emarginula conica Lamarck, 1801; Emarginula conica Lamarck, 1801 junior subjective synonym; Emarginula elata Libassi, 1859; † Emarginula elata Michaud, 1877 junior subjective synonym; Emarginula emendata G. B. Sowerby II, 1863; Emarginula fissura var. elata Jeffreys, 1865; Emarginula fissura var. incurva Jeffreys, 1865; Emarginula fissura var. subdepressa Jeffreys, 1865; † Emarginula giraudi Michaud, 1877 junior subjective synonym; Emarginula intervecta Locard, 1898; Emarginula laevis Récluz, 1843; Emarginula muelleri Forbes & Hanley, 1849; Emarginula reticulata J. Sowerby, 1813; Emarginula tenuis Récluz, 1843 (dubious synonym); Patella fissura Linnaeus, 1758; Semperia emendata (G. B. Sowerby II, 1863)

= Emarginula fissura =

Species of gastropod

Emarginula fissura, the common slit limpet, is a species of sea snail, a marine gastropod mollusk in the family Fissurellidae, the keyhole limpets.

Piero Piani (1984) has demonstrated in a publication that there is no reason to prefer the synonym Emarginula reticulata Sowerby, 1813 over the older name Patella fissura Linnaeus, 1758.

== Description ==
The shell of the slit limpet has an elevated conical profile with its apex strongly curved backwards, but never overhanging the posterior margin. The color of the shell is dull white, gray or yellowish. The shell is usually about 10 mm long (but can reach a length of 15 mm), 8 mm high and 6 mm wide. The shell has a reticulate (= net-like) sculpture with 25-35 radial ribs, alternating stronger and weaker, intersecting with spiraled ridges. There is a narrow and deep slit at the anterior margin above the mantle cavity. An exhalent siphon projects thorough this slit. The aperture of the shell occupies the whole undersurface of the shell and lacks an operculum.

The shield-shaped foot is broader anteriorly. It has on each side ten well-developed tentacles at the epipodium (the lateral grooves between foot and mantle). There is an additional tentacle at the right side at the back of the head.

The larvae have a short planktonic development, non-planktotrophic as usual in Vetigastropoda and Patellogastropoda

== Distribution and habitat ==
The slit limpet is a common keyhole limpet and can be found along the eastern Atlantic, west European coasts, as far north as Norway and the Faroe Islands and south to the Canary Islands. It is a rare in the western Mediterranean Sea. It thrives on the lower shore and the subtidal zone to a depth of 265 m on rocks and hard substrates where sponges occur.

== Feeding habits ==
The slit limpet is omnivorous. It is a deposit feeder, creeping slowly along a rock surface and grazing on algae as well as sponges.
