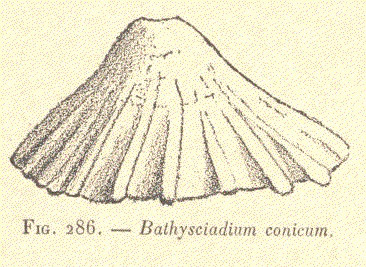

Scientific classification
- Kingdom: Animalia
- Phylum: Mollusca
- Class: Gastropoda
- Subclass: Vetigastropoda
- Superfamily: Cocculinoidea
- Family: Bathysciadiidae; Dautzenberg & H. Fischer, 1900

Diversity
- 8 extant species

Synonyms
- Bathypeltidae Moskalev, 1971

= Bathysciadiidae =

Family of gastropods

Bathysciadiidae is a family of sea snails, deep-sea limpets, marine gastropod mollusks in the clade Cocculiniformia (according to the taxonomy of the Gastropoda by Bouchet & Rocroi, 2005).

This family has no subfamilies.

== Genera ==
Genera within the family Bathysciadiidae include:

- Bathyaltum Haszprunar, 2011
- Bathypelta Moskalev, 1971
- Bathysciadium Dautzenberg & Fischer, 1900 - type genus of the family Bathysciadiidae
- Bonus Moskalev, 1973
  - Bonus petrochenckoi Moskalev, 1973
- Pilus Warén, 1991
- Xenodonta Warén, 1993
