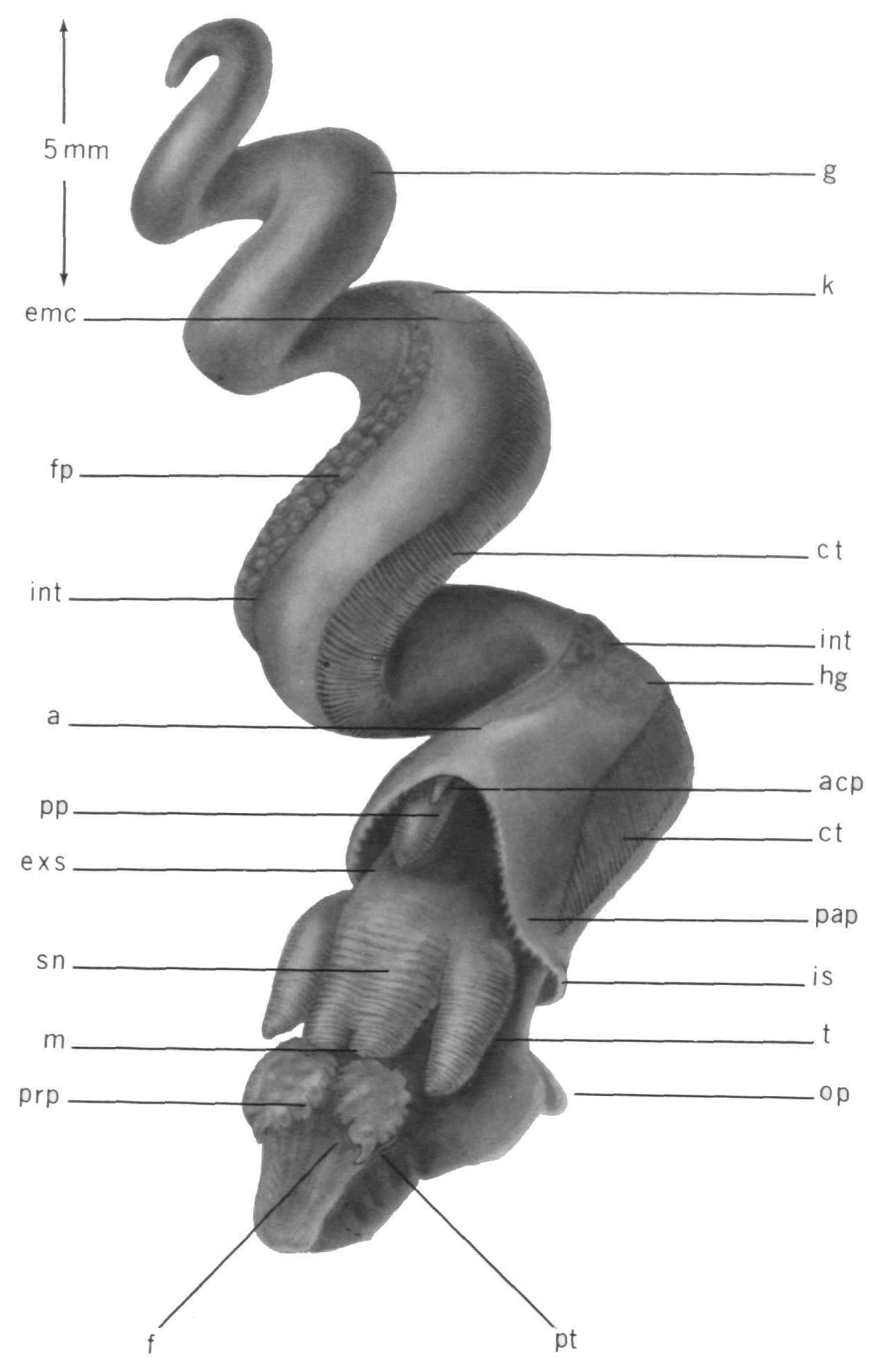
- Anatomy of the soft parts of Abyssochrysos melanioides removed from the shell

Scientific classification
- Kingdom: Animalia
- Phylum: Mollusca
- Class: Gastropoda
- Subclass: Caenogastropoda
- Order: incertae sedis
- Superfamily: Abyssochrysoidea
- Family: Abyssochrysidae; Tomlin, 1927

Type genus
- Abyssochrysos Tomlin, 1927

= Abyssochrysidae =

Abyssochrysidae Temporal range: Jurassic–Recent

Family of gastropods

Abyssochrysidae is a family of sea snails, marine gastropod mollusks in the clade Caenogastropoda (according to the taxonomy of the Gastropoda by Bouchet & Rocroi, 2005).

== Taxonomy ==
The family Abyssochrysidae was previously placed in the "Zygopleuroid group" (according to the taxonomy of the Gastropoda by Bouchet & Rocroi, 2005). This family has no subfamilies (according to the taxonomy of the Gastropoda by Bouchet & Rocroi, 2005).

In 2008, the sister group Provannidae was moved into the superfamily Abyssochrysoidea Tomlin, 1927 by Kain et al. and the family Abyssochrysidae was also moved into the superfamily Abyssochrysoidea.

== Genera ==
Genera within this family include:

- Acanthostrophia
  - Acanthostrophia acanthica - a fossil from the Jurassic of Italy, and the oldest known species in the family Abyssochrysidae.
- Abyssochrysos Tomlin, 1927 - the type genus of the family
- Humptulipsia Kiel, 2008
  - Humptulipsia raui (Goedert & Kaler, 1996) - synonym: Abyssochrysos raui Goedert & Kaler, 1996 - a fossil species from the Eocene
