= Joculator uveanus =

Scientific classification
- Kingdom: Animalia
- Phylum: Mollusca
- Class: Gastropoda
- Subclass: Caenogastropoda
- Order: incertae sedis
- Family: Cerithiopsidae
- Genus: Joculator
- Species: J. uveanus

Binomial name
- Joculator uveanus (Melvill & Standen, 1896)

Species of gastropod

Joculator uveanus is a species of small sea snail, a marine gastropod mollusc in the family Cerithiopsidae. The species was described by Melvill and Standen in 1896.
