= Joculator tomacula =

Scientific classification
- Kingdom: Animalia
- Phylum: Mollusca
- Class: Gastropoda
- Subclass: Caenogastropoda
- Order: incertae sedis
- Family: Cerithiopsidae
- Genus: Joculator
- Species: J. tomacula

Binomial name
- Joculator tomacula Laseron, 1956

Species of gastropod

Joculator tomacula is a species of small sea snail, a marine gastropod mollusc in the family Cerithiopsidae. It was described by Charles Francis Laseron in 1956.
