= Joculator cereus =

Scientific classification
- Kingdom: Animalia
- Phylum: Mollusca
- Class: Gastropoda
- Subclass: Caenogastropoda
- Order: incertae sedis
- Family: Cerithiopsidae
- Genus: Joculator
- Species: J. cereus

Binomial name
- Joculator cereus Cecalupo & Perugia, 2012

Species of gastropod

Joculator cereus is a species of small sea snails, marine gastropod molluscs in the family Cerithiopsidae. It was described by Cecalupo and Perugia in 2012.
