= Joculator eudeli =

Scientific classification
- Kingdom: Animalia
- Phylum: Mollusca
- Class: Gastropoda
- Subclass: Caenogastropoda
- Order: incertae sedis
- Family: Cerithiopsidae
- Genus: Joculator
- Species: J. eudeli

Binomial name
- Joculator eudeli Jay & Drivas, 2002

Species of gastropod

Joculator eudeli is a species of small sea snails, marine gastropod molluscs in the family Cerithiopsidae. It was described by Jay and Drivas in 2002.
