= Joculator brucei =

Scientific classification
- Kingdom: Animalia
- Phylum: Mollusca
- Class: Gastropoda
- Subclass: Caenogastropoda
- Order: incertae sedis
- Family: Cerithiopsidae
- Genus: Joculator
- Species: J. brucei

Binomial name
- Joculator brucei (Melvill & Standen, 1912)

Species of gastropod

Joculator brucei is a species of small sea snails, marine gastropod molluscs in the family Cerithiopsidae. It was described by Melvill and Standen in 1912.

== Description ==
The maximum recorded shell length is 2.75 mm.

== Habitat ==
Minimum recorded depth is 66 m. Maximum recorded depth is 66 m.
