= Joculator megacephala =

Scientific classification
- Kingdom: Animalia
- Phylum: Mollusca
- Class: Gastropoda
- Subclass: Caenogastropoda
- Order: incertae sedis
- Family: Cerithiopsidae
- Genus: Joculator
- Species: J. megacephala

Binomial name
- Joculator megacephala Jay & Drivas, 2002

Species of gastropod

Joculator megacephala is a species of small sea snail, a marine gastropod mollusc in the family Cerithiopsidae. The species was described by Jay and Drivas in 2002.
