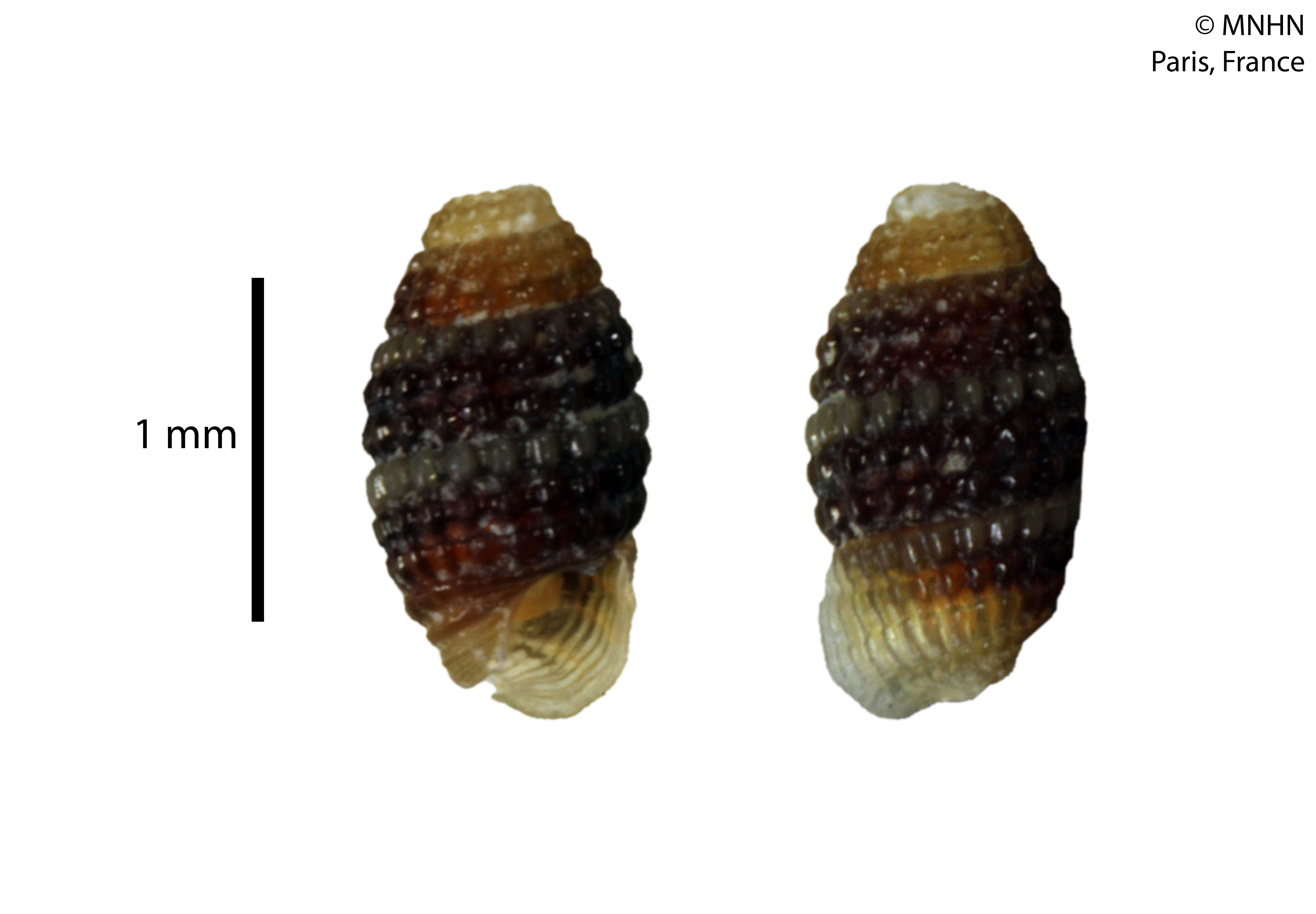
- Shell of Joculator christiaensi (specimen at MNHN, Paris)

Scientific classification
- Kingdom: Animalia
- Phylum: Mollusca
- Class: Gastropoda
- Subclass: Caenogastropoda
- Order: incertae sedis
- Family: Cerithiopsidae
- Genus: Joculator
- Species: J. christiaensi

Binomial name
- Joculator christiaensi Jay & Drivas, 2002

= Joculator christiaensi =

Species of gastropod

Joculator christiaensi is a species of small sea snails, marine gastropod molluscs in the family Cerithiopsidae.

It was first described by Jay and Drivas in 2002.

== Distribution ==
This marine species occurs off Southern Madagascar and off Réunion.
