= Joculator myia =

Scientific classification
- Kingdom: Animalia
- Phylum: Mollusca
- Class: Gastropoda
- Subclass: Caenogastropoda
- Order: incertae sedis
- Family: Cerithiopsidae
- Genus: Joculator
- Species: J. myia

Binomial name
- Joculator myia Jay & Drivas, 2002

Synonyms
- Nanopsis myia (Jay & Drivas, 2002)

Species of gastropod

Joculator myia is a species of minute sea snail, a marine gastropod mollusc in the family Cerithiopsidae.

The species was described by Jay and Drivas in 2002.
