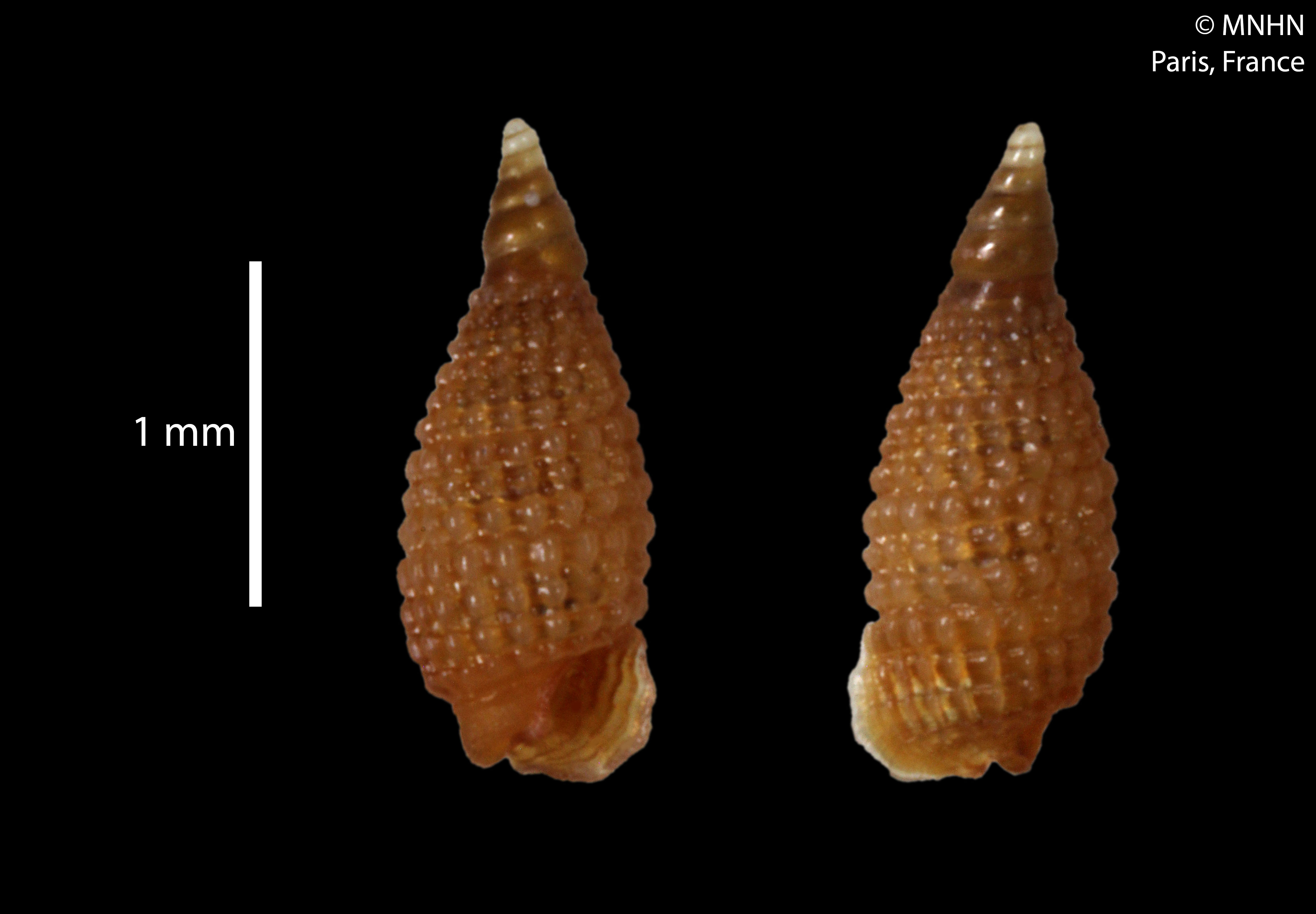
- Shell of Joculator mygaki (specimen at MNHN, Paris)

Scientific classification
- Kingdom: Animalia
- Phylum: Mollusca
- Class: Gastropoda
- Subclass: Caenogastropoda
- Order: incertae sedis
- Family: Cerithiopsidae
- Genus: Joculator
- Species: J. mygaki

Binomial name
- Joculator mygaki Jay & Drivas, 2002

= Joculator mygaki =

Species of gastropod

Joculator mygaki is a species of small sea snail, a marine gastropod mollusc in the family Cerithiopsidae. The species was described by Jay and Drivas in 2002.

== Distribution ==
This marine species occurs off Southern Madagascar and Réunion.
