= Joculator granatus =

Scientific classification
- Kingdom: Animalia
- Phylum: Mollusca
- Class: Gastropoda
- Subclass: Caenogastropoda
- Order: incertae sedis
- Family: Cerithiopsidae
- Genus: Joculator
- Species: J. granatus

Binomial name
- Joculator granatus Kay, 1979

Synonyms
- Joculator granata Kay, 1979 (original combination; incorrect gender ending); Nanopsis granata (Kay, 1979)

Species of gastropod

Joculator granatus is a species of small sea snail, a marine gastropod mollusc in the family Cerithiopsidae. The species was described by Kay in 1979.
