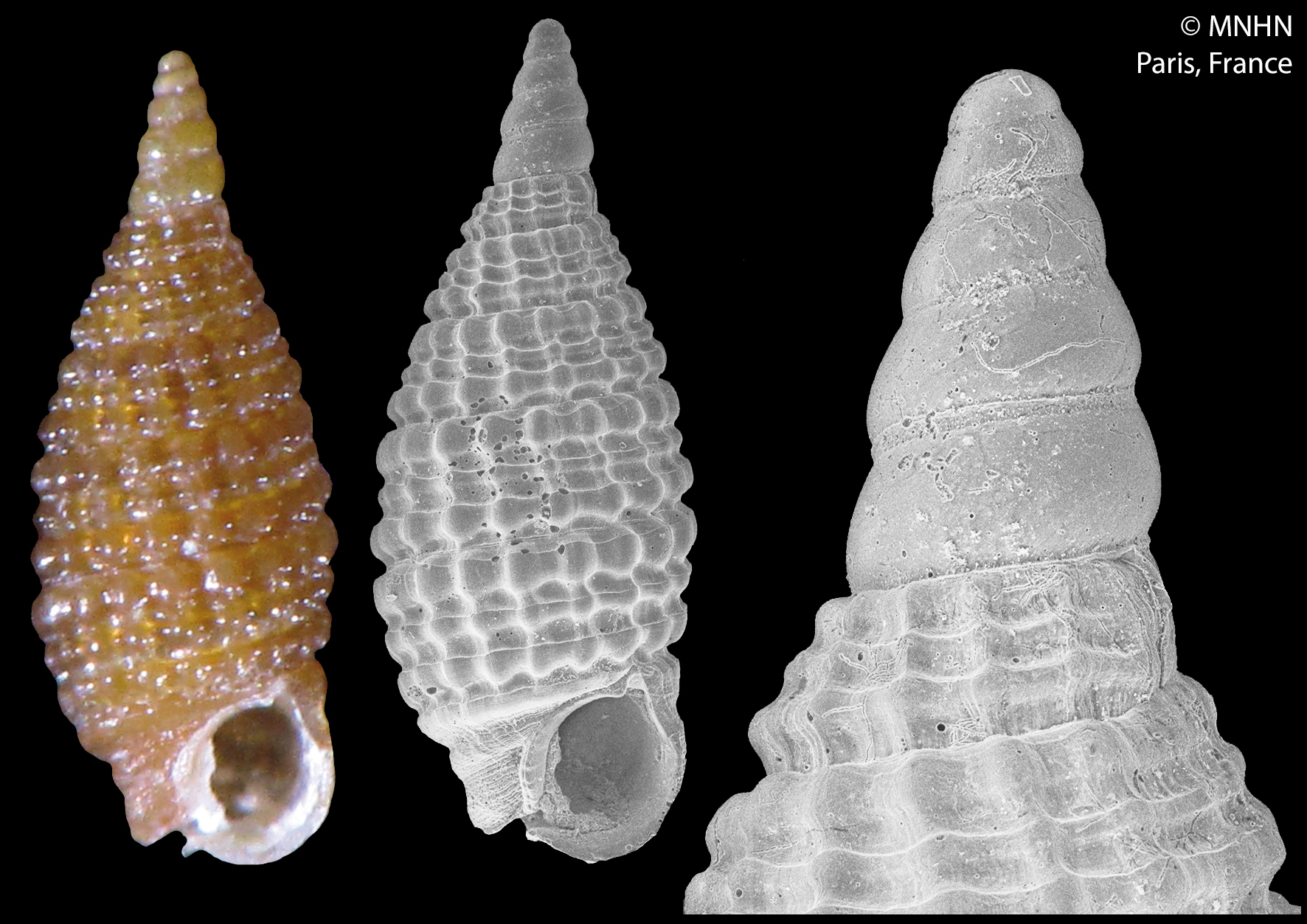
- Joculator variabilis

Scientific classification
- Kingdom: Animalia
- Phylum: Mollusca
- Class: Gastropoda
- Subclass: Caenogastropoda
- Order: incertae sedis
- Family: Cerithiopsidae
- Genus: Joculator; Hedley, 1909

Type species
- Cerithiopsis ridicula Watson, 1886

Synonyms
- Cerithiopsis (Joculator) Hedley, 1909; Cyrbasia (Joculator) Hedley, 1909

= Joculator =

Genus of gastropods

Joculator is a genus of minute sea snails, marine gastropod molluscs in the family Cerithiopsidae. This genus was described by Hedley in 1909.

== Species ==
Species in the genus Joculator include:

- Joculator abbreviatus (Thiele, 1930)
- Joculator acuminatus Cecalupo & Perugia, 2012
- Joculator aeneus Cecalupo & Perugia, 2017
- Joculator albatus Cecalupo & Perugia, 2023
- Joculator albordina Laseron, 1956
- Joculator albulus (Thiele, 1930)
- Joculator alligatus Cecalupo & Perugia, 2012
- Joculator anconae Cecalupo & Perugia, 2017
- Joculator angustus Cecalupo & Perugia, 2017
- Joculator antonioi Cecalupo & Perugia, 2012
- Joculator aoreensis Cecalupo & Perugia, 2013
- Joculator arduinii Cecalupo & Perugia, 2012
- Joculator arenaceus Cecalupo & Perugia, 2013
- Joculator ariadnae Cecalupo & Perugia, 2018
- Joculator ater Cecalupo & Perugia, 2012
- Joculator aterrufus Cecalupo & Perugia, 2019
- Joculator autumnus Cecalupo & Perugia, 2016
- Joculator bangkaensis Cecalupo & Perugia, 2019
- Joculator baraggiai Cecalupo & Perugia, 2013
- Joculator barteri Cecalupo & Perugia, 2018
- Joculator barteri Cecalupo & Perugia, 2018
- Joculator bauquisi Cecalupo & Perugia, 2017
- Joculator berberiani Cecalupo & Perugia, 2018
- Joculator bicinctus Cecalupo & Perugia, 2012
- Joculator boguszae Cecalupo & Perugia, 2018
- Joculator bourgeoisae Cecalupo & Perugia, 2013
- Joculator boguszae Cecalupo & Perugia, 2018
- Joculator bouteti Cecalupo & Perugia, 2014
- Joculator brabantae Cecalupo & Perugia, 2013
- Joculator breviculus Cecalupo & Perugia, 2017
- Joculator brevis Cecalupo & Perugia, 2012
- Joculator brisseti Cecalupo & Perugia, 2021
- Joculator brucei (Melvill & Standen, 1912)
- Joculator brusonii Cecalupo & Perugia, 2013
- Joculator caliginosus Cecalupo & Perugia, 2012
- Joculator caloi Cecalupo & Perugia, 2013
- Joculator carpatinus Cecalupo & Perugia, 2012
- Joculator castaneus Cecalupo & Perugia, 2013
- Joculator cereus Cecalupo & Perugia, 2012
- Joculator christiaensi Jay & Drivas, 2002
- Joculator cinctus Cecalupo & Perugia, 2012
- Joculator citrinus Cecalupo & Perugia, 2013
- Joculator coffeus Cecalupo & Perugia, 2013
- Joculator conformis Cecalupo & Perugia, 2013
- Joculator continens Laseron, 1956
- Joculator corneliae Cecalupo & Perugia, 2018
- Joculator cossignanii Cecalupo & Perugia, 2012
- Joculator cristinae Cecalupo & Perugia, 2013
- Joculator czubai Cecalupo & Perugia, 2018
- Joculator dakoi Cecalupo & Perugia, 2018
- † Joculator decapitatus Grant-Mackie & Chapman-Smith, 1971
- Joculator desmieri Cecalupo & Perugia, 2018
- Joculator diversus Cecalupo & Perugia, 2019
- Joculator drivasi Cecalupo & Perugia, 2012
- Joculator dupouxae Cecalupo & Perugia, 2018
- Joculator emidioi Cecalupo & Perugia, 2014
- Joculator erianae Cecalupo & Perugia, 2017
- Joculator eudeli Jay & Drivas, 2002
- Joculator faninozi Cecalupo & Perugia, 2018
- Joculator fedosovi Cecalupo & Perugia, 2018
- Joculator ferrii Cecalupo & Perugia, 2013
- Joculator ferrugineus Cecalupo & Perugia, 2012
- Joculator filum Cecalupo & Perugia, 2017
- Joculator fischeri Jay & Drivas, 2002
- Joculator flindersi Cotton, 1951
- Joculator flavicans Cecalupo & Perugia, 2014
- Joculator frequens Cecalupo & Perugia, 2012
- Joculator fulvaster Cecalupo & Perugia, 2019
- Joculator furvus Cecalupo & Perugia, 2012
- Joculator fuscostriatus Cecalupo & Perugia, 2013
- Joculator fuscus Cecalupo & Perugia, 2012
- Joculator gagulae Cecalupo & Perugia, 2018
- Joculator ganui Cecalupo & Perugia, 2018
- Joculator garianii Cecalupo & Perugia, 2013
- Joculator gemmae Cecalupo & Perugia, 2012
- Joculator giovanolii Cecalupo & Perugia, 2013
- Joculator gorini Cecalupo & Perugia, 2014
- Joculator goubini Cecalupo & Perugia, 2017
- Joculator gracilis Laseron, 1951
- Joculator granatus Kay, 1979
- Joculator granulosus Cecalupo & Perugia, 2013
- Joculator grimalae Cecalupo & Perugia, 2021
- Joculator hadfieldae Cecalupo & Perugia, 2017
- Joculator hasegawai Cecalupo & Perugia, 2019
- Joculator hedleyi Laseron, 1951
- Joculator herosae Cecalupo & Perugia, 2012
- Joculator humilis Cecalupo & Perugia, 2012
- Joculator ianthinus Cecalupo & Perugia, 2013
- Joculator incisus Cecalupo & Perugia, 2012
- Joculator inflatus Cecalupo & Perugia, 2012
- Joculator introspectus Cotton, 1951
- Joculator iopuei Cecalupo & Perugia, 2017
- Joculator itiensis Cecalupo & Perugia, 2014
- Joculator jeffkinchi Cecalupo & Perugia, 2018
- Joculator johnkasui Cecalupo & Perugia, 2018
- Joculator juliuschani Cecalupo & Perugia, 2018
- Joculator kaipuae Cecalupo & Perugia, 2018
- Joculator kanoi Cecalupo & Perugia, 2013
- Joculator kenganziki Cecalupo & Perugia, 2018
- Joculator keratochroma Jay & Drivas, 2002
- Joculator keszlerae Cecalupo & Perugia, 2021
- Joculator koluae Cecalupo & Perugia, 2021
- Joculator kuboi Cecalupo & Perugia, 2019
- Joculator laguncula (Cecalupo & Perugia, 2012)
- Joculator laregnereensis Cecalupo & Perugia, 2017
- Joculator laseroni Jay & Drivas, 2002
- Joculator latrechei Cecalupo & Perugia, 2021
- Joculator lazzarii Cecalupo & Perugia, 2013
- Joculator legallae Cecalupo & Perugia, 2014
- Joculator legoffi Cecalupo & Perugia, 2017
- Joculator lazzarii Cecalupo & Perugia, 2013
- Joculator leguyaderi Cecalupo & Perugia, 2013
- Joculator lividus Cecalupo & Perugia, 2012
- Joculator lokaroensis Cecalupo & Perugia, 2014
- Joculator lozoueti Jay & Drivas, 2002
- Joculator luteolus Cecalupo & Perugia, 2012
- † Joculator maestratii Lozouet, Lesport & Renard, 2001
- Joculator magninensis Cecalupo & Perugia, 2017
- Joculator maloensis Cecalupo & Perugia, 2013
- Joculator manneensis Cecalupo & Perugia, 2018
- Joculator maranii Cecalupo & Perugia, 2014
- Joculator marinae Cecalupo & Perugia, 2014
- Joculator massimilianoi Cecalupo & Perugia, 2012
- Joculator mauberti Cecalupo & Perugia, 2018
- Joculator mbereensis Cecalupo & Perugia, 2017
- Joculator meanii Cecalupo & Perugia, 2014
- Joculator megacephala Jay & Drivas, 2002
- Joculator melania Laseron, 1956
- Joculator melanoraphis Jay & Drivas, 2002
- Joculator micalii Cecalupo & Perugia, 2012
- Joculator michoni Cecalupo & Perugia, 2018
- Joculator minimului Cecalupo & Perugia, 2018
- Joculator minimus Laseron, 1956
- Joculator minor Laseron, 1956
- Joculator minutissimus (Thiele, 1925)
- Joculator minutus Cecalupo & Perugia, 2012
- Joculator mitsuoi Cecalupo & Perugia, 2019
- Joculator modestus Cecalupo & Perugia, 2012
- Joculator morenae Cecalupo & Perugia, 2013
- Joculator morigii Cecalupo & Perugia, 2017
- Joculator murciai Cecalupo & Perugia, 2014
- Joculator mygaki Jay & Drivas, 2002
- Joculator myia Jay & Drivas, 2002
- Joculator nitidus Cecalupo & Perugia, 2012
- Joculator nucleus Cecalupo & Perugia, 2019
- Joculator obscurus Cecalupo & Perugia, 2012
- Joculator obsoletus Cecalupo & Perugia, 2012
- Joculator occultus Cecalupo & Perugia, 2012
- Joculator olivoideus Cecalupo & Perugia, 2018
- Joculator onnaensis Cecalupo & Perugia, 2019
- Joculator opulentus Cecalupo & Perugia, 2013
- Joculator ovatus Laseron, 1956
- Joculator pallidus Cecalupo & Perugia, 2012
- Joculator parvulus Cecalupo & Perugia, 2012
- Joculator pauxillus Cecalupo & Perugia, 2012
- Joculator perforatus Cecalupo & Perugia, 2013
- Joculator perlucidus Cecalupo & Perugia, 2012
- Joculator phtyr Jay & Drivas, 2002
- Joculator pierresamueli Cecalupo & Perugia, 2021
- Joculator pinguis Cecalupo & Perugia, 2012
- Joculator pizzinii Cecalupo & Perugia, 2013
- Joculator priorai Cecalupo & Perugia, 2012
- Joculator problematicus Albano & Steger, 2021
- Joculator prunus Cecalupo & Perugia, 2013
- Joculator psyllos Jay & Drivas, 2002
- Joculator pulvis (Issel, 1869)
- Joculator pumilus Cecalupo & Perugia, 2018
- Joculator pupiformis Cecalupo & Perugia, 2012
- Joculator pygmaeus Cecalupo & Perugia, 2012
- Joculator quaggiottoi Cecalupo & Perugia, 2012
- Joculator ralijanoai Cecalupo & Perugia, 2014
- Joculator ralphmanai Cecalupo & Perugia, 2018
- Joculator rambellii Cecalupo & Perugia, 2018
- Joculator recisus Cecalupo & Perugia, 2012
- Joculator ridiculus (Watson, 1886)
- Joculator rolani Cecalupo & Perugia, 2012
- Joculator rubus Cecalupo & Perugia, 2013
- Joculator sabrinae Cecalupo & Perugia, 2012
- Joculator saguili Cecalupo & Perugia, 2013
- Joculator salvati Jay & Drivas, 2002
- Joculator sarahpezetae Cecalupo & Perugia, 2018
- Joculator savellii Cecalupo & Perugia, 2021
- Joculator sbranai Cecalupo & Perugia, 2021
- Joculator schiaparellii Cecalupo & Perugia, 2017
- Joculator sekensis Cecalupo & Perugia, 2018
- Joculator semiperlucidus Cecalupo & Perugia, 2013
- Joculator simonsili Cecalupo & Perugia, 2018
- Joculator simulans Cecalupo & Perugia, 2012
- Joculator siwisikae Cecalupo & Perugia, 2018
- Joculator steykerae Cecalupo & Perugia, 2013
- Joculator stramineus Cecalupo & Perugia, 2013
- Joculator subconicus Cecalupo & Perugia, 2012
- Joculator subdolus Cecalupo & Perugia, 2012
- Joculator subglobosus Cecalupo & Perugia, 2013
- Joculator sublima Marshall, 1978
- Joculator subula Laseron, 1956
- Joculator succineus Cecalupo & Perugia, 2013
- Joculator sylviakinchae Cecalupo & Perugia, 2018
- Joculator tagliaferroi Cecalupo & Perugia, 2017
- Joculator testaceus Cecalupo & Perugia, 2013
- Joculator testii Cecalupo & Perugia, 2017
- Joculator theresae Cecalupo & Perugia, 2018
- Joculator thielei Jay & Drivas, 2002
- Joculator tieensis Cecalupo & Perugia, 2017
- Joculator tomacula Laseron, 1956
- Joculator tribulationis (Hedley, 1909)
- Joculator tsiriveloi Cecalupo & Perugia, 2014
- Joculator unicolor Cecalupo & Perugia, 2012
- Joculator uveanus (Melvill & Standen, 1896)
- Joculator vandelae Cecalupo & Perugia, 2014
- Joculator variabilis Cecalupo & Perugia, 2012
- Joculator varians Laseron, 1956
- Joculator vassardi Cecalupo & Perugia, 2014
- Joculator vazzanai Cecalupo & Perugia, 2018
- Joculator venustus Cecalupo & Perugia, 2013
- Joculator vignali Jay & Drivas, 2002
- Joculator violaceus Cecalupo & Perugia, 2012
- Joculator voncoseli Cecalupo & Perugia, 2012
- Joculator websterae Cecalupo & Perugia, 2014
- Joculator zahariasi Cecalupo & Perugia, 2021
- Joculator ziliolii Cecalupo & Perugia, 2012
- Joculator zucconi Cecalupo & Perugia, 2021

Taxa inquirenda

- Joculator aelomitres (Melvill & Standen, 1896)
- Joculator marileutes (Melvill & Standen, 1896)

Species brought into synonymy

- Joculator albocinctum (Melvill & Standen, 1896): synonym of Costulopsis albocincta (Melvill & Standen, 1896)
- Joculator albula (Thiele, 1930): synonym of Joculator albulus (Thiele, 1930)
- Joculator caelata Powell, 1930: synonym of Synthopsis caelata (Powell, 1930)
- Joculator granata Kay, 1979: synonym of Nanopsis granata (Kay, 1979)
- Joculator introspecta Cotton, 1951: synonym of Joculator introspectus Cotton, 1951
- Joculator iohannae Cecalupo & Perugia, 2012: synonym of Synthopsis iohannae (Cecalupo & Perugia, 2012)
- Joculator minima Laseron, 1956: synonym of Joculator minimus Laseron, 1956
- Joculator minutissima (Thiele, 1925): synonym of Joculator minutissimus (Thiele, 1925)
- Joculator myia Jay & Drivas, 2002: synonym of Nanopsis myia (Jay & Drivas, 2002)
- Joculator nanus Laseron, 1951: synonym of Potenatomus nanus (Laseron, 1951)
- Joculator ovata Laseron, 1956: synonym of Joculator ovatus Laseron, 1956
- Joculator ridicula: synonym of Joculator ridiculus (Watson, 1886)
- Joculator semipicta (Gould, 1861): synonym of Joculator semipictus (Gould, 1861)
- Joculator semipictus (Gould, 1861): synonym of Horologica semipicta (Gould, 1861)
- Joculator skolix Jay & Drivas, 2002: synonym of Costulopsis skolix (Jay & Drivas, 2002) (original combination)
- Joculator turriger (Watson, 1886): synonym of Horologica turrigera (Watson, 1886)
- Joculator turrigera (Watson, 1886): synonym of Joculator turriger (Watson, 1886)
- Joculator uveanum (Melvill & Standen, 1896): synonym of Joculator uveanus (Melvill & Standen, 1896)
