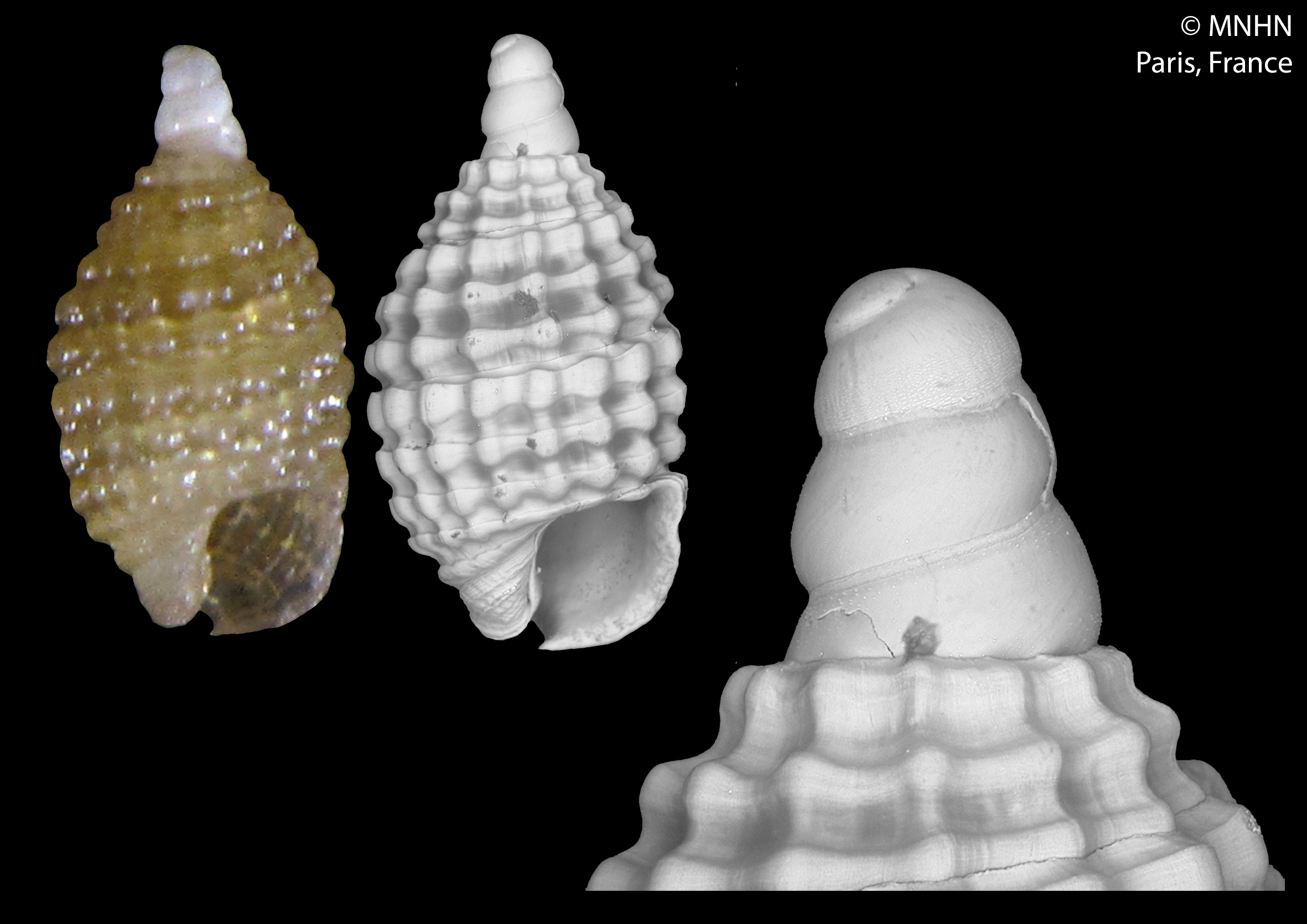
- Shell of Joculator minutus (specimen at MNHN, Paris)

Scientific classification
- Kingdom: Animalia
- Phylum: Mollusca
- Class: Gastropoda
- Subclass: Caenogastropoda
- Order: incertae sedis
- Family: Cerithiopsidae
- Genus: Joculator
- Species: J. minutus

Binomial name
- Joculator minutus Cecalupo & Perugia, 2012

= Joculator minutus =

Species of gastropod

Joculator minutus is a species of small sea snail, a marine gastropod mollusc in the family Cerithiopsidae. The species was described by Cecalupo and Perugia in 2012.

== Distribution ==
This marine species occurs off Papua New Guinea.
