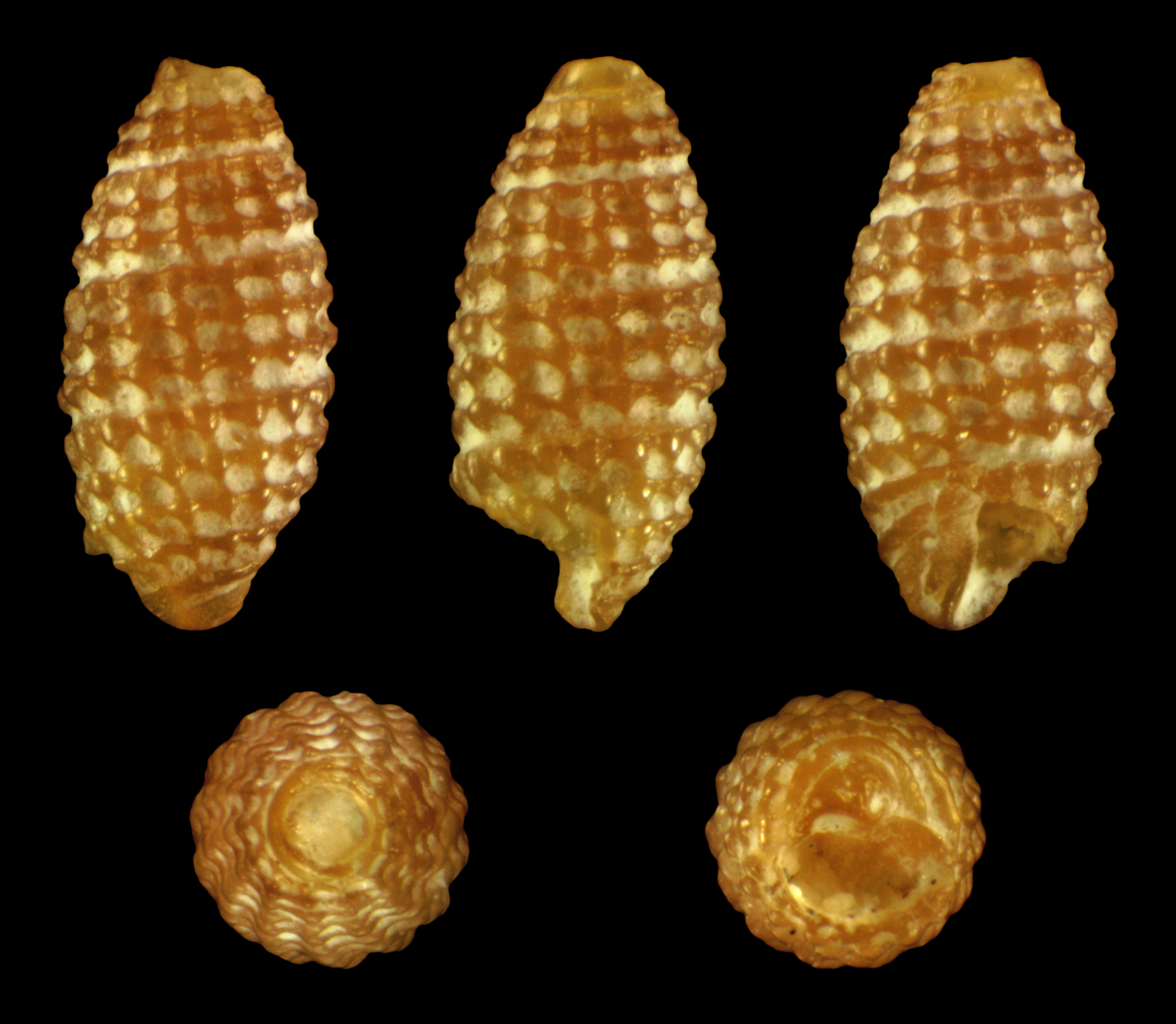

Scientific classification
- Kingdom: Animalia
- Phylum: Mollusca
- Class: Gastropoda
- Subclass: Caenogastropoda
- Order: incertae sedis
- Family: Cerithiopsidae
- Genus: Joculator
- Species: J. minutissimus

Binomial name
- Joculator minutissimus (Thiele, 1925)

= Joculator minutissimus =

Species of gastropod

Joculator minutissimus is a species of small sea snail, a marine gastropod mollusc in the family Cerithiopsidae. The species was described by Thiele in 1925.
