= Joculator albulus =

Scientific classification
- Kingdom: Animalia
- Phylum: Mollusca
- Class: Gastropoda
- Subclass: Caenogastropoda
- Order: incertae sedis
- Family: Cerithiopsidae
- Genus: Joculator
- Species: J. albulus

Binomial name
- Joculator albulus (Thiele, 1930)

Species of gastropod

Joculator albulus is a species of small sea snails, marine gastropod molluscs in the family Cerithiopsidae. It was described by Thiele in 1930.
