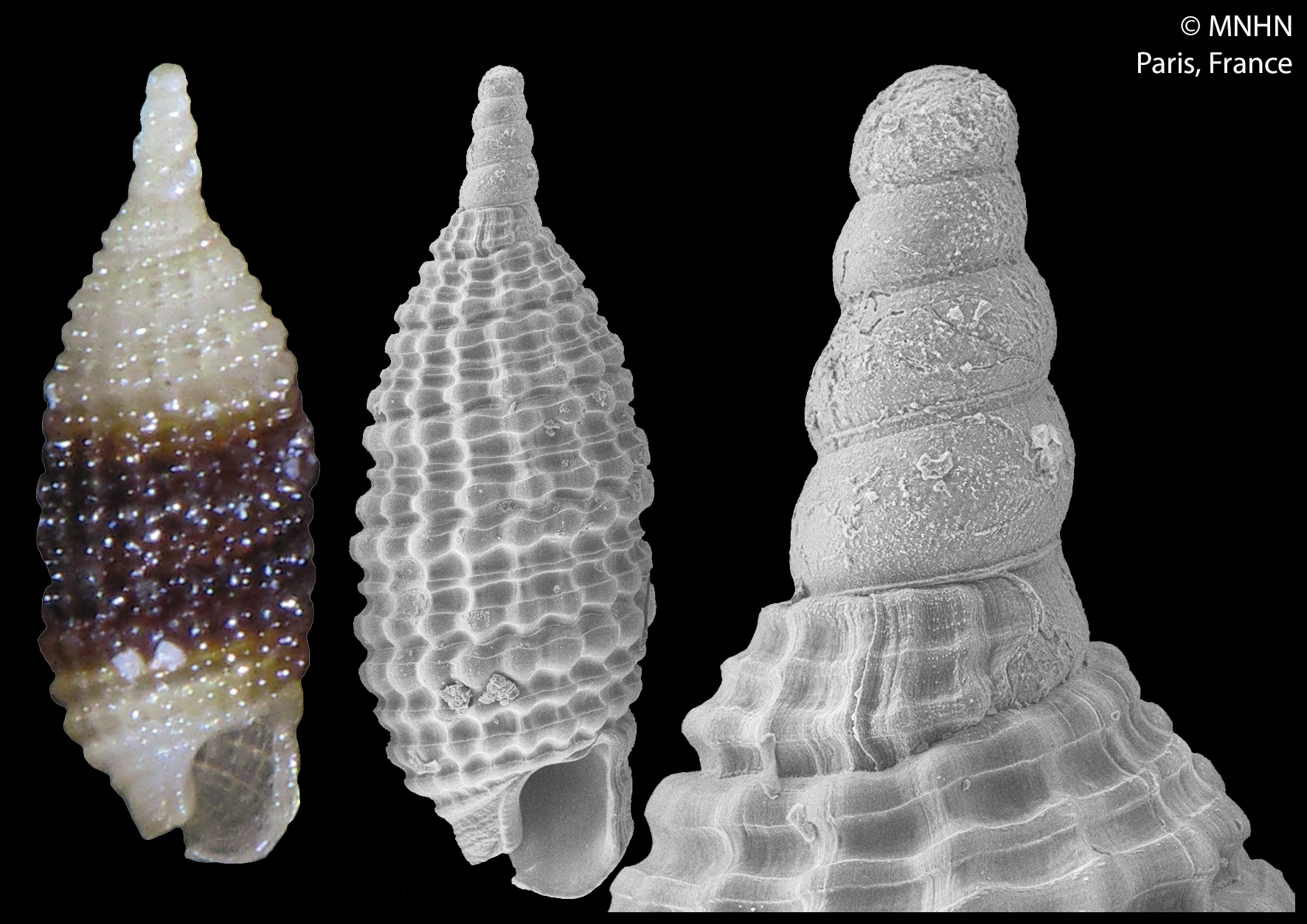
- Shell of Joculator alligatus (specimen at MNHN, Paris)

Scientific classification
- Kingdom: Animalia
- Phylum: Mollusca
- Class: Gastropoda
- Subclass: Caenogastropoda
- Order: incertae sedis
- Family: Cerithiopsidae
- Genus: Joculator
- Species: J. alligatus

Binomial name
- Joculator alligatus Cecalupo & Perugia, 2012

= Joculator alligatus =

Species of gastropod

Joculator alligatus is a species of small sea snails, marine gastropod molluscs in the family Cerithiopsidae.

The species was first described by Cecalupo and Perugia in 2012.

== Distribution ==
This marine species occurs off Papua New Guinea.
