= Specula styliformis =

Scientific classification
- Kingdom: Animalia
- Phylum: Mollusca
- Class: Gastropoda
- Subclass: Caenogastropoda
- Order: incertae sedis
- Family: Cerithiopsidae
- Genus: Specula
- Species: S. styliformis

Binomial name
- Specula styliformis (Suter, 1908)

Synonyms
- Cerithiopsis styliformis Suter, 1908; Seila dissimilis Suter, 1908; Specula dissimilis (Suter, 1908)

Species of gastropod

Specula styliformis is a species of small sea snail, a marine gastropod mollusc or micromollusc in the family Cerithiopsidae.
