= Cubalaskeya machoi =

Scientific classification
- Kingdom: Animalia
- Phylum: Mollusca
- Class: Gastropoda
- Subclass: Caenogastropoda
- Clade: Hypsogastropoda
- Family: Cerithiopsidae
- Genus: Cubalaskeya
- Species: C. machoi

Binomial name
- Cubalaskeya machoi Espinosa, Ortea & Moro, 2008

Species of gastropod

Cubalaskeya machoi is a species of sea snail, a gastropod in the family Cerithiopsidae. It was described by Espinosa, Ortea and Moro, in 2008.
