= Cerithiopsidella cosmia =

Scientific classification
- Kingdom: Animalia
- Phylum: Mollusca
- Class: Gastropoda
- Subclass: Caenogastropoda
- Order: incertae sedis
- Family: Cerithiopsidae
- Genus: Cerithiopsidella
- Species: C. cosmia

Binomial name
- Cerithiopsidella cosmia (Bartsch, 1907)

Species of gastropod

Cerithiopsidella cosmia is a species of very small sea snails, marine gastropod molluscs in the family Cerithiopsidae. It was described by Paul Bartsch in 1907.
