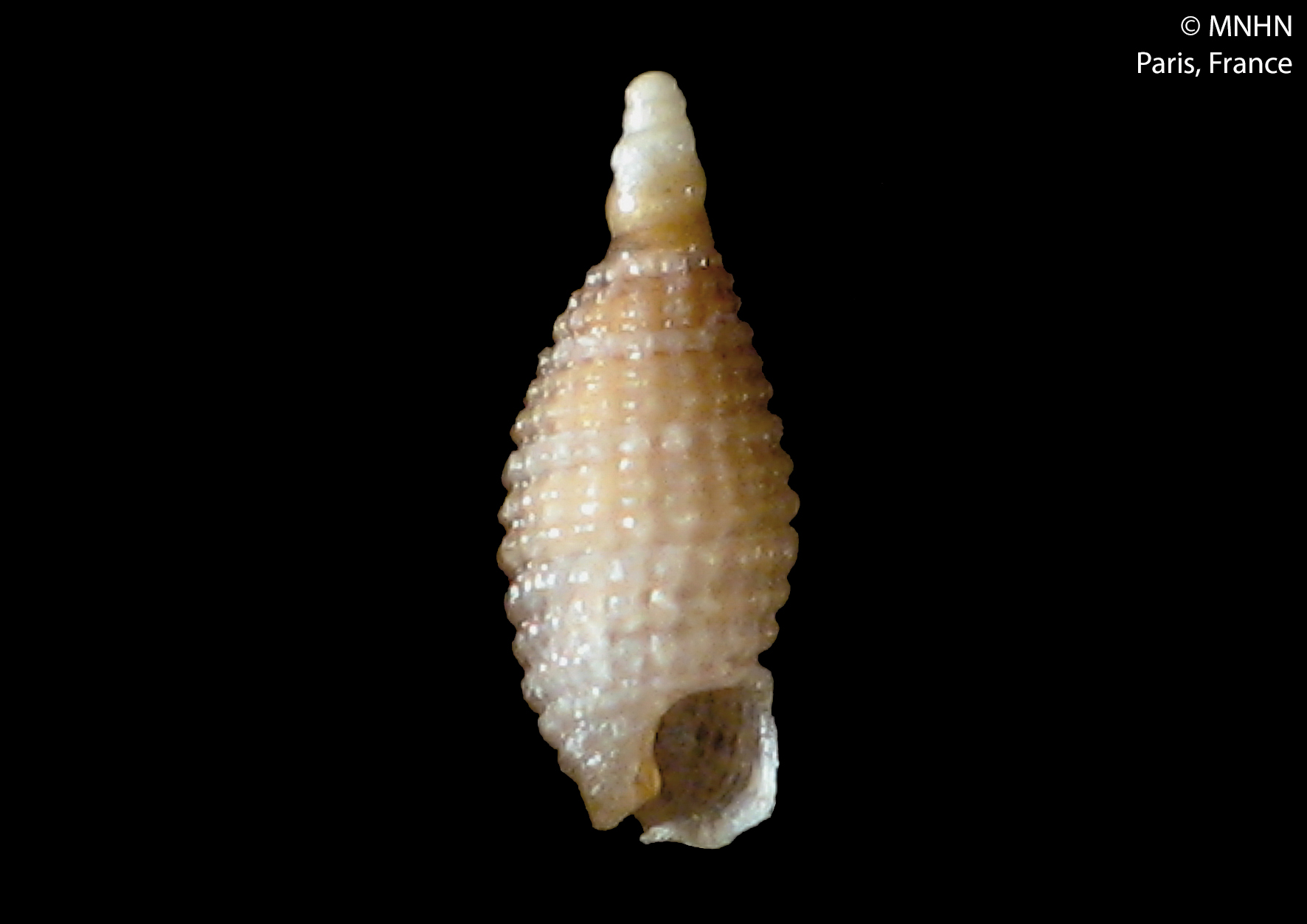
- Shell of Joculator parvulus (specimen at MNHN, Paris)

Scientific classification
- Kingdom: Animalia
- Phylum: Mollusca
- Class: Gastropoda
- Subclass: Caenogastropoda
- Order: incertae sedis
- Family: Cerithiopsidae
- Genus: Joculator
- Species: J. parvulus

Binomial name
- Joculator parvulus Cecalupo & Perugia, 2012

= Joculator parvulus =

Species of gastropod

Joculator parvulus is a species of minute sea snail, a marine gastropod mollusc in the family Cerithiopsidae.

The species was described by Cecalupo and Perugia in 2012.

== Distribution ==
This marine species occurs off the Philippines.
