= Cubalaskeya nivea =

Scientific classification
- Kingdom: Animalia
- Phylum: Mollusca
- Class: Gastropoda
- Subclass: Caenogastropoda
- Order: incertae sedis
- Family: Cerithiopsidae
- Genus: Cubalaskeya
- Species: C. nivea

Binomial name
- Cubalaskeya nivea (Faber, 2007)

Synonyms
- Retilaskeya nivea Faber, 2007 (basionym)

Species of gastropod

Cubalaskeya nivea is a species of sea snail, a gastropod in the family Cerithiopsidae. It was described by Faber, in 2007.
