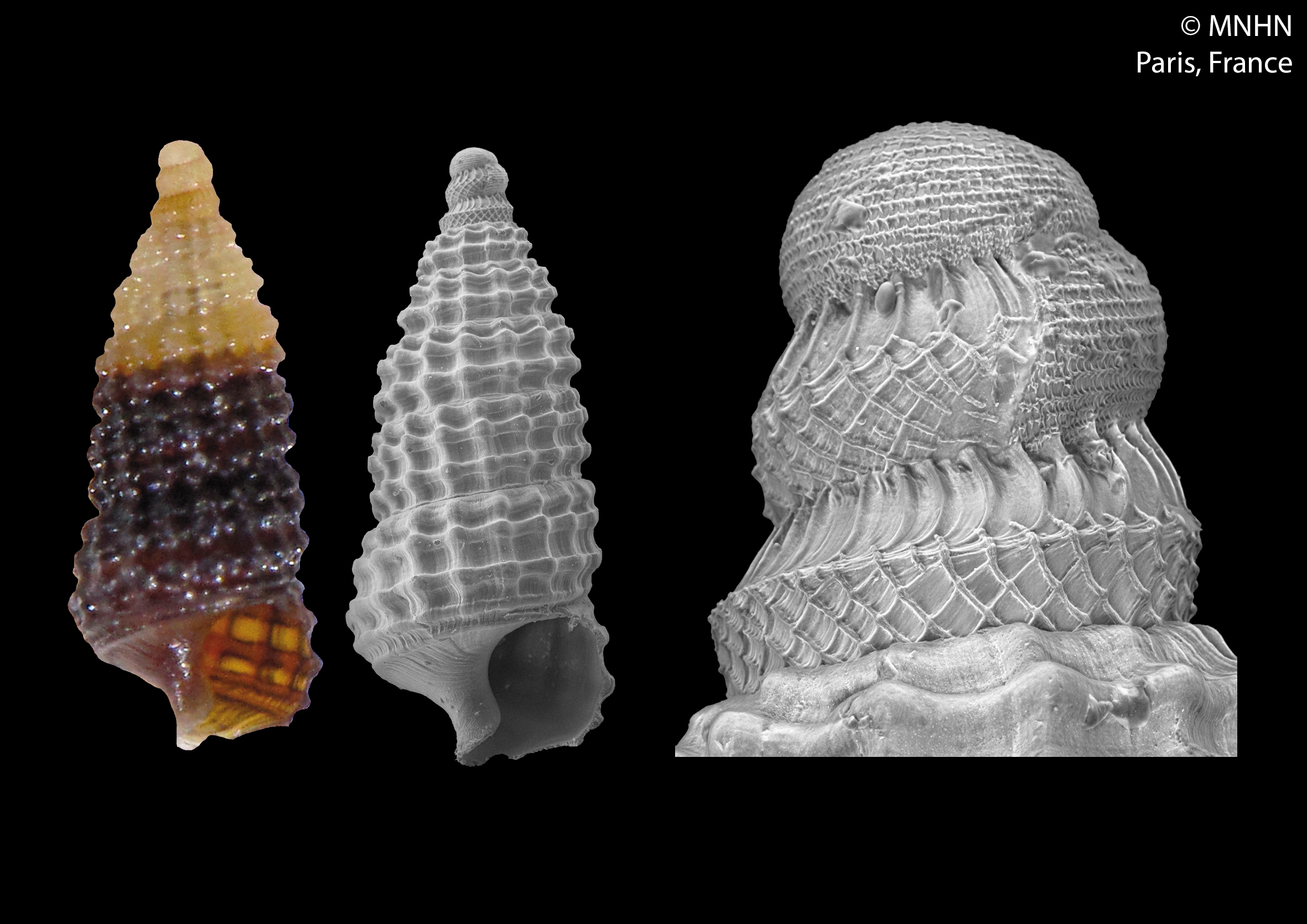
- Shell of Cerithiopsidella ziliolii (specimen at MNHN, Paris)

Scientific classification
- Kingdom: Animalia
- Phylum: Mollusca
- Class: Gastropoda
- Subclass: Caenogastropoda
- Order: incertae sedis
- Family: Cerithiopsidae
- Genus: Cerithiopsidella
- Species: C. ziliolii

Binomial name
- Cerithiopsidella ziliolii Cecalupo & Perugia, 2012

= Cerithiopsidella ziliolii =

Species of gastropod

Cerithiopsidella ziliolii is a species of very small sea snails, marine gastropod molluscs in the family Cerithiopsidae. It was described by Cecalupo and Perugia in 2012.

== Distribution ==
This marine species occurs off Papua New Guinea.
