= Specula retifera =

Scientific classification
- Kingdom: Animalia
- Phylum: Mollusca
- Class: Gastropoda
- Subclass: Caenogastropoda
- Order: incertae sedis
- Family: Cerithiopsidae
- Genus: Specula
- Species: S. retifera

Binomial name
- Specula retifera (Suter, 1908)

Synonyms
- Bittium retiferum Suter, 1908; Cerithiopsis canaliculata Suter, 1908; Specula canaliculata (Suter, 1908)

Species of gastropod

Specula retifera is a species of small sea snail, a marine gastropod mollusc in the family Cerithiopsidae.

== Distribution ==
This marine species occurs off New Zealand.
