= Cubalaskeya cubana =

Scientific classification
- Kingdom: Animalia
- Phylum: Mollusca
- Class: Gastropoda
- Subclass: Caenogastropoda
- Order: incertae sedis
- Family: Cerithiopsidae
- Genus: Cubalaskeya
- Species: C. cubana

Binomial name
- Cubalaskeya cubana Rolán & Fernández-Garcés, 2008

Species of gastropod

Cubalaskeya cubana is a species of sea snail, a gastropod in the family Cerithiopsidae. It was described by Rolán and Fernández-Garcés, in 2008.
