= Cerithiopsidella blacki =

Scientific classification
- Kingdom: Animalia
- Phylum: Mollusca
- Class: Gastropoda
- Subclass: Caenogastropoda
- Order: incertae sedis
- Family: Cerithiopsidae
- Genus: Cerithiopsidella
- Species: C. blacki

Binomial name
- Cerithiopsidella blacki Marshall, 1978

Species of gastropod

Cerithiopsidella blacki is a species of very small sea snails, marine gastropod molluscs in the family Cerithiopsidae. It was described by Marshall in 1978.
