= Dizoniopsis herberti =

Scientific classification
- Kingdom: Animalia
- Phylum: Mollusca
- Class: Gastropoda
- Subclass: Caenogastropoda
- Order: incertae sedis
- Family: Cerithiopsidae
- Genus: Dizoniopsis
- Species: D. herberti

Binomial name
- Dizoniopsis herberti Jay & Drivas, 2002

Species of gastropod

Dizoniopsis herberti is a species of sea snail, a gastropod in the family Cerithiopsidae. It was described by Jay and Drivas in 2002.
