= Belonimorphis cubensis =

Scientific classification
- Kingdom: Animalia
- Phylum: Mollusca
- Class: Gastropoda
- Subclass: Caenogastropoda
- Order: incertae sedis
- Family: Cerithiopsidae
- Genus: Belonimorphis
- Species: B. cubensis

Binomial name
- Belonimorphis cubensis (Rolán & Espinosa, 1992)

Synonyms
- Horologica cubensis Rolán & Espinosa, 1992 (original combination)

Species of gastropod

Belonimorphis cubensis is a species of sea snail, a gastropod in the family Cerithiopsidae. It was described by Rolán and Espinosa, in 1992.

== Description ==
The maximum recorded shell length is 3.5 mm.

== Habitat ==
Minimum recorded depth is 10 m. Maximum recorded depth is 30 m.
