= Belonimorphis belonimorphis =

Scientific classification
- Kingdom: Animalia
- Phylum: Mollusca
- Class: Gastropoda
- Subclass: Caenogastropoda
- Order: incertae sedis
- Family: Cerithiopsidae
- Genus: Belonimorphis
- Species: B. belonimorphis

Binomial name
- Belonimorphis belonimorphis Jay & Drivas, 2002

Species of gastropod

Belonimorphis belonimorphis is a species of very small sea snail, a marine gastropod mollusk in the family Cerithiopsidae. The species was described by Jay and Drivas in 2002.
