= Alipta crenistria =

Scientific classification
- Kingdom: Animalia
- Phylum: Mollusca
- Class: Gastropoda
- Subclass: Caenogastropoda
- Order: incertae sedis
- Family: Cerithiopsidae
- Genus: Alipta
- Species: A. crenistria

Binomial name
- Alipta crenistria (Suter, 1907)

Synonyms
- Cerithiopsis crenistria Suter, 1907

Species of gastropod

Alipta crenistria is a species of very small sea snail, a marine gastropod mollusc in the family Cerithiopsidae.
