= Cerithiopsidella antefilosa =

Scientific classification
- Kingdom: Animalia
- Phylum: Mollusca
- Class: Gastropoda
- Subclass: Caenogastropoda
- Order: incertae sedis
- Family: Cerithiopsidae
- Genus: Cerithiopsidella
- Species: C. antefilosa

Binomial name
- Cerithiopsidella antefilosa (Bartsch, 1911)

Species of gastropod

Cerithiopsidella antefilosa is a species of very small sea snails, marine gastropod molluscs in the family Cerithiopsidae. It was described by Paul Bartsch in 1911.
