= Mendax trizonalis =

Scientific classification
- Kingdom: Animalia
- Phylum: Mollusca
- Class: Gastropoda
- Subclass: Caenogastropoda
- Order: incertae sedis
- Family: Cerithiopsidae
- Genus: Mendax
- Species: M. trizonalis

Binomial name
- Mendax trizonalis (Odhner, 1924)

Synonyms
- Cerithiopsis trizonalis Odhner, 1924 (original combination); Mendax trizonalis trizonalis (Odhner, 1924) · accepted, alternate representation

Species of gastropod

Mendax trizonalis is a species of small sea snail, a marine gastropod mollusc in the family Cerithiopsidae.

Subspecies

- Mendax trizonalis odhneri (Powell, 1927)
- Mendax trizonalis trizonalis (Odhner, 1924) represented as Mendax trizonalis (Odhner, 1924) (alternate representation
