= Costulopsis albocincta =

Scientific classification
- Kingdom: Animalia
- Phylum: Mollusca
- Class: Gastropoda
- Subclass: Caenogastropoda
- Order: incertae sedis
- Family: Cerithiopsidae
- Genus: Costulopsis
- Species: C. albocincta

Binomial name
- Costulopsis albocincta (Melvill & Standen, 1896)

Synonyms
- Bittium albocinctum Melvill & Standen, 1896 (original combination); Joculator albocinctum (Melvill & Standen, 1896)

Species of gastropod

Costulopsis albocincta is a species of minute sea snails, marine gastropod mollusc in the family Cerithiopsidae.

It was described by Melvill and Standen in 1896.

== Distribution ==
This marine species occurs off the Loyalty Islands.
