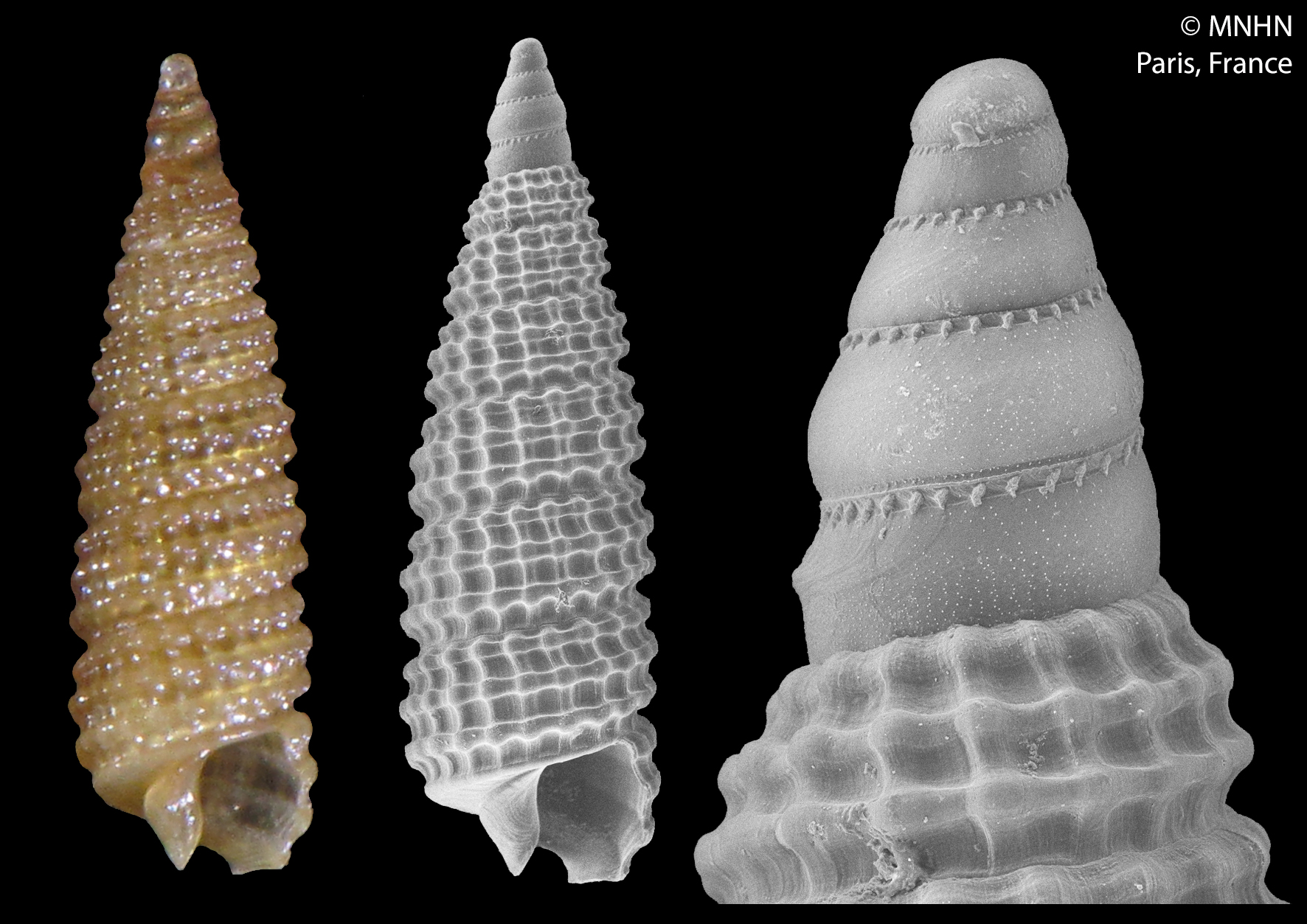
- Synthopsis mactanensis

Scientific classification
- Kingdom: Animalia
- Phylum: Mollusca
- Class: Gastropoda
- Subclass: Caenogastropoda
- Order: incertae sedis
- Superfamily: Triphoroidea
- Family: Cerithiopsidae
- Genus: Synthopsis; Laseron, 1956

Type species
- Synthopsis cylindrica Laseron, 1956

= Synthopsis =

Genus of gastropods

Synthopsis is a genus of very small sea snails, marine gastropod molluscs in the family Cerithiopsidae, the cerithids.

== Species ==
Species within the genus Synthopsis include:

- Synthopsis acuminata Marshall, 1978
- Synthopsis albachiarae Cecalupo & Perugia, 2012
- Synthopsis albatros Cecalupo & Perugia, 2014
- Synthopsis albostriata Cecalupo & Perugia, 2013
- Synthopsis ampulla Cecalupo & Perugia, 2012
- Synthopsis anelauensis Cecalupo & Perugia, 2018
- Synthopsis annachicchiae Cecalupo & Perugia, 2018
- Synthopsis attenuata Cecalupo & Perugia, 2012
- Synthopsis augurellii Cecalupo & Perugia, 2018
- Synthopsis battagliai Cecalupo & Perugia, 2012
- Synthopsis bicincta Cecalupo & Perugia, 2012
- Synthopsis bongiardinoi Cecalupo & Perugia, 2012
- Synthopsis byronensis Cecalupo & Perugia, 2018
- Synthopsis caelata (Powell, 1930)
- Synthopsis cancellata (Laseron, 1951)
- Synthopsis cebuensis Cecalupo & Perugia, 2012
- Synthopsis columnaLaseron, 1956
- Synthopsis cylindricaLaseron, 1956
- Synthopsis decorata Cecalupo & Perugia, 2012
- Synthopsis demissaLaseron, 1956
- Synthopsis dibellai Cecalupo & Perugia, 2019
- Synthopsis difficilis Cecalupo & Perugia, 2017
- Synthopsis eburnea Cecalupo & Perugia, 2014
- Synthopsis elegans Cecalupo & Perugia, 2012
- Synthopsis eleonorae Cecalupo & Perugia, 2017
- Synthopsis enzae Cecalupo & Perugia, 2012
- Synthopsis exilis (Laseron, 1951)
- Synthopsis gratiosa Cecalupo & Perugia, 2012
- Synthopsis inedita Cecalupo & Perugia, 2012
- Synthopsis iohannae (Cecalupo & Perugia, 2012)
- Synthopsis lapernai Cecalupo & Perugia, 2014
- Synthopsis laurae Cecalupo & Perugia, 2012
- Synthopsis lauta Cecalupo & Perugia, 2013
- Synthopsis limpida Cecalupo & Perugia, 2012
- Synthopsis lineata Cecalupo & Perugia, 2014
- Synthopsis lozoueti Cecalupo & Perugia, 2012
- Synthopsis maestratii Cecalupo & Perugia, 2012
- Synthopsis maioi Cecalupo & Perugia, 2021
- Synthopsis memorabilis Cecalupo & Perugia, 2012
- Synthopsis mirabilis Cecalupo & Perugia, 2012
- Synthopsis newirelandensis Cecalupo & Perugia, 2018
- Synthopsis noumeaensis Cecalupo & Perugia, 2017
- Synthopsis nusaensis Cecalupo & Perugia, 2018
- Synthopsis nutzeli Cecalupo & Perugia, 2012
- Synthopsis ouaoensis Cecalupo & Perugia, 2017
- Synthopsis panglaoensis Cecalupo & Perugia, 2012
- Synthopsis placaisae Cecalupo & Perugia, 2013
- Synthopsis plaziati Cecalupo & Perugia, 2012
- Synthopsis praeacuta Cecalupo & Perugia, 2012
- Synthopsis prima Cecalupo & Perugia, 2012
- Synthopsis producta Cecalupo & Perugia, 2012
- Synthopsis quadrii Cecalupo & Perugia, 2012
- Synthopsis querzolai Cecalupo & Perugia, 2013
- Synthopsis radixLaseron, 1956
- Synthopsis rapaensis Cecalupo & Perugia, 2014
- Synthopsis regia Marshall, 1978
- Synthopsis richeri Cecalupo & Perugia, 2017
- Synthopsis robbai Cecalupo & Perugia, 2012
- † Synthopsis ronquerollensis (Gougerot & Le Renard, 1981)
- Synthopsis russoi Cecalupo & Perugia, 2019
- Synthopsis santaluciaensis Poppe & Tagaro, 2026
- Synthopsis sartorei Cecalupo & Perugia, 2012
- Synthopsis sebastianoi Cecalupo & Perugia, 2012
- Synthopsis serenae Cecalupo & Perugia, 2012
- Synthopsis shoujii Cecalupo & Perugia, 2019
- Synthopsis siarensis Cecalupo & Perugia, 2018
- Synthopsis silviae Cecalupo & Perugia, 2012
- Synthopsis similior Cecalupo & Perugia, 2013
- Synthopsis spadai Cecalupo & Perugia, 2017
- Synthopsis spectabilis Cecalupo & Perugia, 2012
- Synthopsis tongoensis Cecalupo & Perugia, 2016
- Synthopsis tumida Cecalupo & Perugia, 2012
- Synthopsis turgida Cecalupo & Perugia, 2012
- Synthopsis turritellata Cecalupo & Perugia, 2012
- Synthopsis uahucaensis Cecalupo & Perugia, 2021
- Synthopsis vallesi Cecalupo & Perugia, 2013
- Synthopsis vaurisi (Jay & Drivas, 2002)
- Synthopsis vavaiensis Cecalupo & Perugia, 2014
- Synthopsis vexillum Cecalupo & Perugia, 2016
- Synthopsis virgula (Laseron, 1951)

Synonyms

- Synthopsis adusta Cecalupo & Perugia, 2018: synonym of Costulopsis adusta (Cecalupo & Perugia, 2018) (original combination)
- Synthopsis ambigua Cecalupo & Perugia, 2013: synonym of Costulopsis ambigua (Cecalupo & Perugia, 2013) (original combination)
- Synthopsis hadfieldi (Jay & Drivas, 2002): synonym of Costulopsis hadfieldi (Jay & Drivas, 2002)
- Synthopsis impedita Cecalupo & Perugia, 2012: synonym of Costulopsis impedita (Cecalupo & Perugia, 2012)
- Synthopsis laguncula Cecalupo & Perugia, 2012: synonym of Joculator laguncula (Cecalupo & Perugia, 2012) (original combination)
- Synthopsis mactanensis Cecalupo & Perugia, 2012: synonym of Costulopsis mactanensis (Cecalupo & Perugia, 2012) (original combination)
- Synthopsis noninii Cecalupo & Perugia, 2012: synonym of Costulopsis noninii (Cecalupo & Perugia, 2012) (original combination)
- Synthopsis tenuicolorata Cecalupo & Perugia, 2012: synonym of Costulopsis tenuicolorata (Cecalupo & Perugia, 2012) (original combination)
