= Joculator melania =

Scientific classification
- Kingdom: Animalia
- Phylum: Mollusca
- Class: Gastropoda
- Subclass: Caenogastropoda
- Order: incertae sedis
- Family: Cerithiopsidae
- Genus: Joculator
- Species: J. melania

Binomial name
- Joculator melania Laseron, 1956

Species of gastropod

Joculator melania is a species of small sea snail, a marine gastropod mollusc in the family Cerithiopsidae. The species was described by Laseron in 1956.
