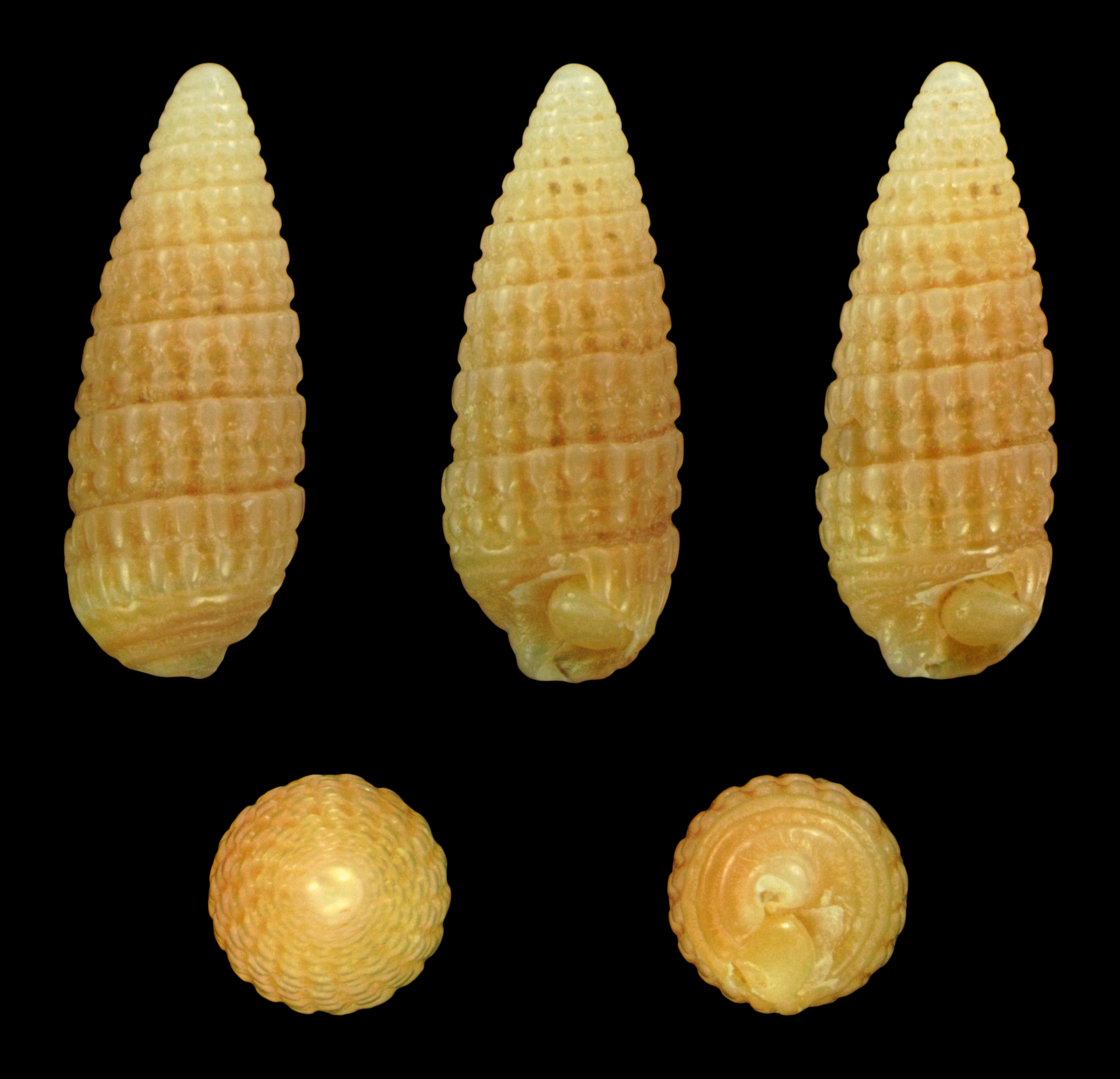

Scientific classification
- Kingdom: Animalia
- Phylum: Mollusca
- Class: Gastropoda
- Subclass: Caenogastropoda
- Order: incertae sedis
- Family: Cerithiopsidae
- Genus: Dizoniopsis
- Species: D. coppolae

Binomial name
- Dizoniopsis coppolae (Aradas, 1870)

= Dizoniopsis coppolae =

Species of gastropod

Dizoniopsis coppolae is a species of sea snail, a gastropod in the family Cerithiopsidae, which is known from European waters, including the Greek Exclusive Economic Zone, Portuguese Exclusive Economic Zone, South West Coast of Apulia, and the Spanish Exclusive Economic Zone. It was described by Aradas, 1870.
