= Costulopsis skolix =

Scientific classification
- Kingdom: Animalia
- Phylum: Mollusca
- Class: Gastropoda
- Subclass: Caenogastropoda
- Order: incertae sedis
- Family: Cerithiopsidae
- Genus: Costulopsis
- Species: C. skolix

Binomial name
- Costulopsis skolix (Jay & Drivas, 2002)

Synonyms
- Joculator skolix Jay & Drivas, 2002 (original combination)

Species of gastropod

Costulopsis skolix is a species of minute sea snail, a marine gastropod mollusc in the family Cerithiopsidae.

The species was described by Jay and Drivas in 2002.
