= Dizoniopsis concatenata =

Scientific classification
- Domain: Eukaryota
- Kingdom: Animalia
- Phylum: Mollusca
- Class: Gastropoda
- Subclass: Caenogastropoda
- Clade: Hypsogastropoda
- Family: Cerithiopsidae
- Genus: Dizoniopsis
- Species: D. concatenata

Binomial name
- Dizoniopsis concatenata (Conti, 1864)

Species of gastropod

Dizoniopsis concatenata is a species of sea snail, a gastropod in the family Cerithiopsidae. It was described by Conti in 1864.
