= Joculator minor =

Scientific classification
- Kingdom: Animalia
- Phylum: Mollusca
- Class: Gastropoda
- Subclass: Caenogastropoda
- Order: incertae sedis
- Family: Cerithiopsidae
- Genus: Joculator
- Species: J. minor

Binomial name
- Joculator minor Laseron, 1956

Species of gastropod

Joculator minor is a species of small sea snail, a marine gastropod mollusc in the family Cerithiopsidae. The species was described by Laseron in 1956.
