= Dizoniopsis apexclarus =

Scientific classification
- Kingdom: Animalia
- Phylum: Mollusca
- Class: Gastropoda
- Subclass: Caenogastropoda
- Order: incertae sedis
- Family: Cerithiopsidae
- Genus: Dizoniopsis
- Species: D. apexclarus

Binomial name
- Dizoniopsis apexclarus Rolán, 2007

Species of gastropod

Dizoniopsis apexclarus is a species of sea snail in the family Cerithiopsidae native to the islands São Tomé, Príncipe and Annobón. It was described by Rolán, in 2007.
