= Synthopsis caelata =

Scientific classification
- Kingdom: Animalia
- Phylum: Mollusca
- Class: Gastropoda
- Subclass: Caenogastropoda
- Order: incertae sedis
- Family: Cerithiopsidae
- Genus: Synthopsis
- Species: S. caelata

Binomial name
- Synthopsis caelata (Powell, 1930)

Species of gastropod

Synthopsis caelata is a species of small sea snail, a marine gastropod mollusc in the family Cerithiopsidae. The species was described by Powell in 1930.
