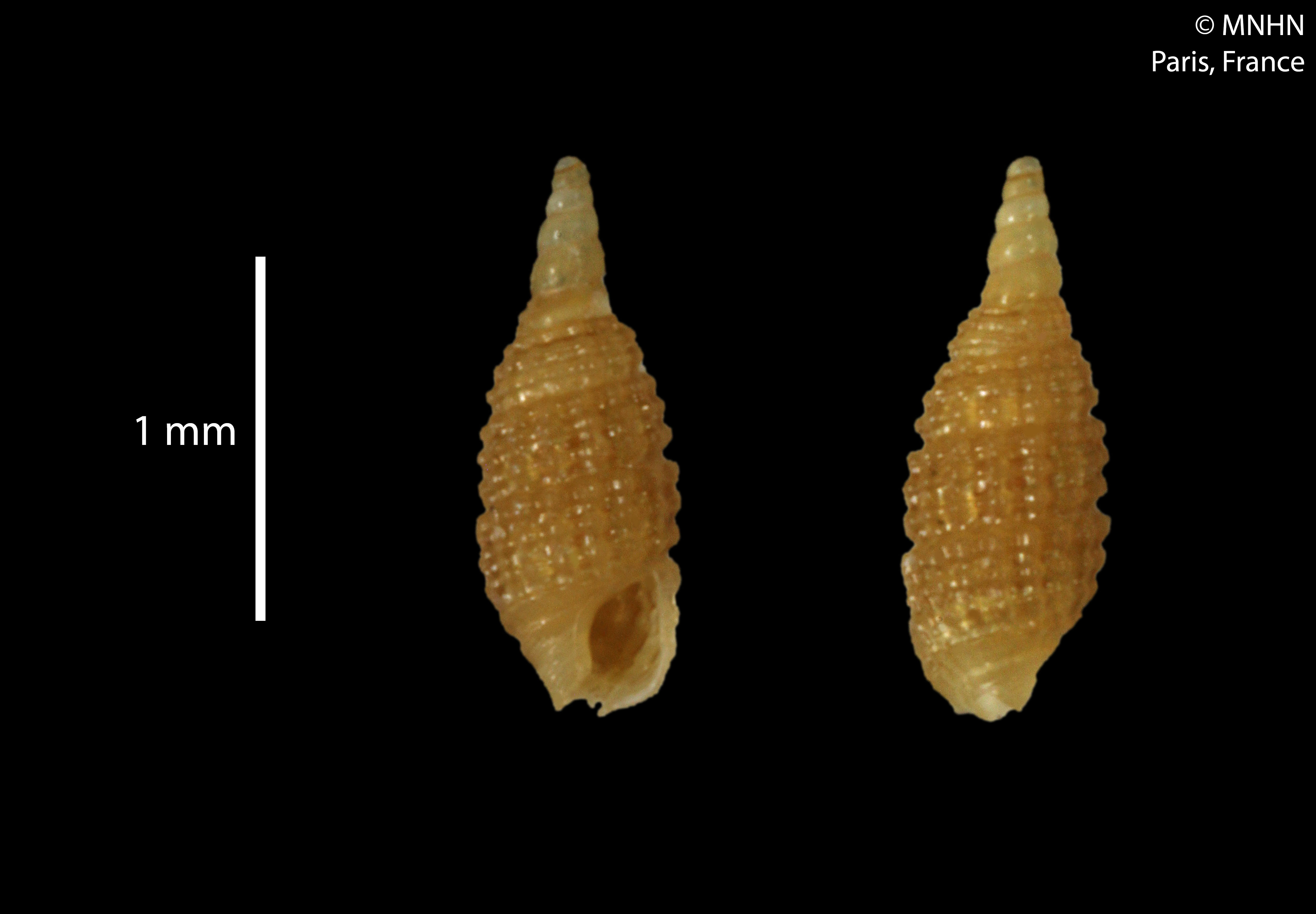
- Shell of Joculator minimus (Specimen at MNHN, Paris)

Scientific classification
- Kingdom: Animalia
- Phylum: Mollusca
- Class: Gastropoda
- Subclass: Caenogastropoda
- Order: incertae sedis
- Family: Cerithiopsidae
- Genus: Joculator
- Species: J. minimus

Binomial name
- Joculator minimus Laseron, 1956

= Joculator minimus =

Species of gastropod

Joculator minimus is a species of small sea snail, a marine gastropod mollusc in the family Cerithiopsidae. The species was described by Laseron in 1956.

== Distribution ==
This marine species occurs off Southern Madagascar and off Queensland, Australia.
