= Dizoniopsis aspicienda =

Scientific classification
- Kingdom: Animalia
- Phylum: Mollusca
- Class: Gastropoda
- Subclass: Caenogastropoda
- Order: incertae sedis
- Family: Cerithiopsidae
- Genus: Dizoniopsis
- Species: D. aspicienda

Binomial name
- Dizoniopsis aspicienda Bouchet, Gofas & Warén, 2010

Species of gastropod

Dizoniopsis aspicienda is a species of sea snail, a gastropod in the family Cerithiopsidae, which is known from the Strait of Gibraltar. It was described by Bouchet, Gofas and Warén, in 2010.
