= Synthopsis iohannae =

Scientific classification
- Kingdom: Animalia
- Phylum: Mollusca
- Class: Gastropoda
- Subclass: Caenogastropoda
- Order: incertae sedis
- Family: Cerithiopsidae
- Genus: Synthopsis
- Species: S. iohannae

Binomial name
- Synthopsis iohannae (Cecalupo & Perugia, 2012)

Synonyms
- Joculator iohannae Cecalupo & Perugia, 2012 (original combination)

Species of gastropod

Synthopsis iohannae is a species of minute sea snail, a marine gastropod mollusc in the family Cerithiopsidae. It was described by Cecalupo and Perugia in 2012.
