= Specula =

Specula is the plural form of speculum and may refer to:

- 86196 Specula, a minor planet
- Specula (gastropod), a genus of minute sea snails, marine gastropod molluscs or micromolluscs in the family Cerithiopsidae
- Specula (watchtower), a watchtower in the Roman times
