= Dizoniopsis bilineata =

Scientific classification
- Domain: Eukaryota
- Kingdom: Animalia
- Phylum: Mollusca
- Class: Gastropoda
- Subclass: Caenogastropoda
- Clade: Hypsogastropoda
- Family: Cerithiopsidae
- Genus: Dizoniopsis
- Species: †D. bilineata

Binomial name
- †Dizoniopsis bilineata (M. Hoernes, 1848)

Synonyms
- †Cerithiopsis bilineata (M. Hoernes, 1848); †Cerithium bilineatum M. Hoernes, 1848

Species of gastropod

Dizoniopsis bilineata is a species of sea snail, a gastropod in the family Cerithiopsidae. It was described by Hoernes in 1848.
