= Synthopsis vaurisi =

Scientific classification
- Kingdom: Animalia
- Phylum: Mollusca
- Class: Gastropoda
- Subclass: Caenogastropoda
- Order: incertae sedis
- Family: Cerithiopsidae
- Genus: Synthopsis
- Species: S. vaurisi

Binomial name
- Synthopsis vaurisi (Jay & Drivas, 2002)

Species of gastropod

Synthopsis vaurisi is a species of sea snail, a gastropod in the family Cerithiopsidae. It was described by Jay and Drivas, in 2002.
