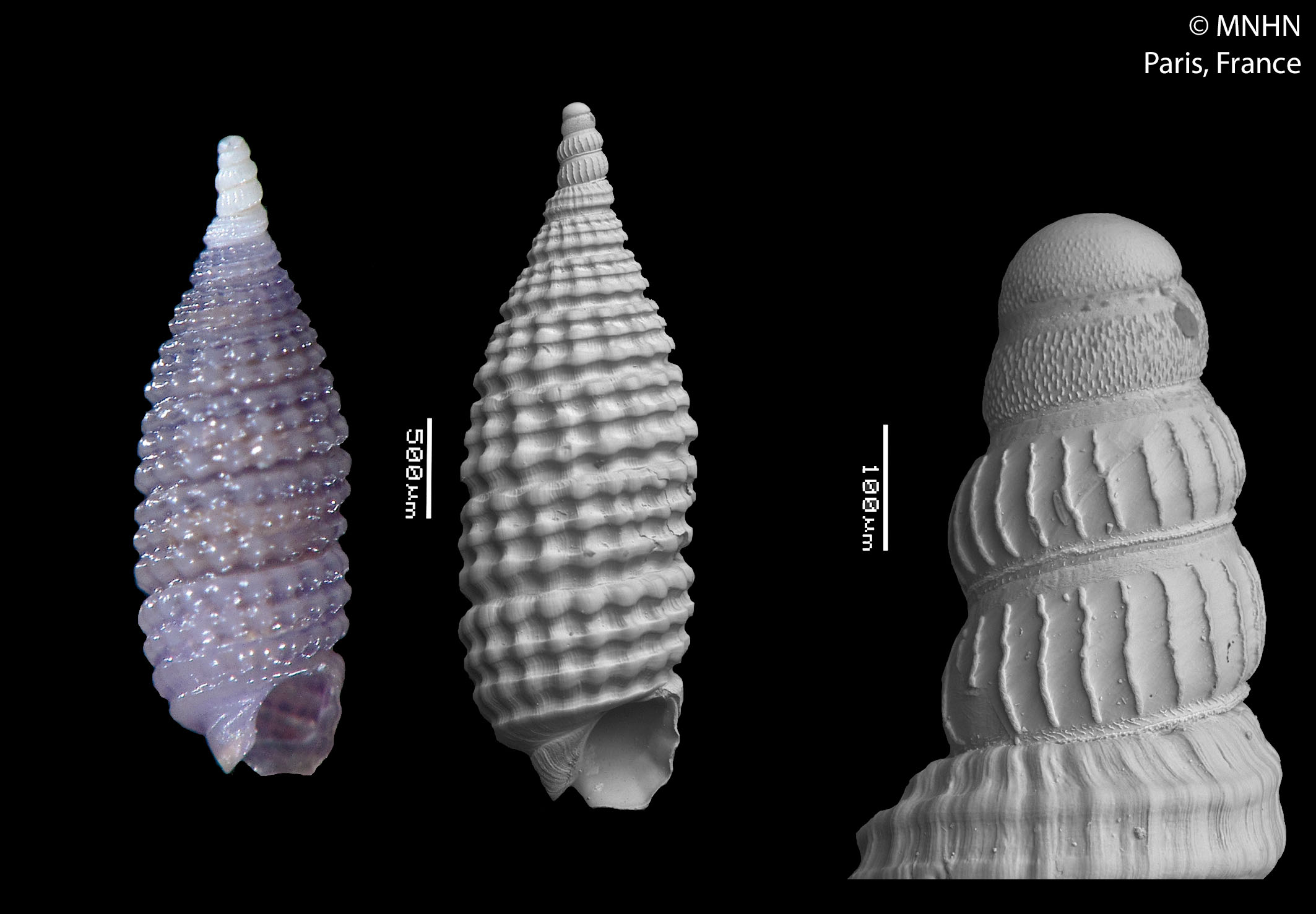
- Shell of Prolixodens amethysta (holotype at MNHN, Paris)

Scientific classification
- Kingdom: Animalia
- Phylum: Mollusca
- Class: Gastropoda
- Subclass: Caenogastropoda
- Order: incertae sedis
- Family: Cerithiopsidae
- Genus: Prolixodens; B. A. Marshall, 1978

Type species
- Cerithiopsis infracolor Laseron, 1951

= Prolixodens =

Genus of gastropods

Prolixodens is a genus of very small sea snails, marine gastropod molluscs in the family Cerithiopsidae.

== Species ==
- Prolixodens alba Cecalupo & Perugia, 2017
- Prolixodens amethysta Cecalupo & Perugia, 2013
- Prolixodens apexcostata (Rolán, Espinosa & Fernández-Garcés, 2007)
- Prolixodens ara (Dall & Bartsch, 1911)
- Prolixodens benthica B. A. Marshall, 1978
- Prolixodens captiosa Cecalupo & Perugia, 2012
- Prolixodens crassa B. A. Marshall, 1978
- Prolixodens dannevigi (Hedley, 1911)
- Prolixodens giampii Cecalupo & Perugia, 2021
- Prolixodens infracolor (Laseron, 1951)
- Prolixodens inopinata (Cecalupo & Perugia, 2012)
- Prolixodens leogattellii Cecalupo & Perugia, 2021
- Prolixodens lutea (Cecalupo & Perugia, 2012)
- Prolixodens martinoi Cecalupo & Perugia, 2021
- Prolixodens memorabilis Cecalupo & Perugia, 2012
- Prolixodens montrouzieri Cecalupo & Perugia, 2017
- Prolixodens nicolayae Jay & Drivas, 2002
- Prolixodens obesa Cecalupo & Perugia, 2017
- Prolixodens obscura (Cecalupo & Perugia, 2012)
- Prolixodens oleagina Cecalupo & Perugia, 2017
- Prolixodens proxima Cecalupo & Perugia, 2014
- Prolixodens scudellarii Cecalupo & Perugia, 2013
- Prolixodens sknips Jay & Drivas, 2002
- Prolixodens splendens Cecalupo & Perugia, 2012
- Prolixodens vannozzii Cecalupo & Perugia, 2021
- Prolixodens vianelloi Cecalupo & Perugia, 2013
- Prolixodens whaaporum Cecalupo & Perugia, 2017
