= Cubalaskeya =

Scientific classification
- Kingdom: Animalia
- Phylum: Mollusca
- Class: Gastropoda
- Subclass: Caenogastropoda
- Order: incertae sedis
- Family: Cerithiopsidae
- Genus: Cubalaskeya; Rolán & Fernández-Garcés, 2008

Type species
- Retilaskeya nivea Faber, 2007

Species
- See text

Genus of gastropods

Cubalaskeya is a genus of minute sea snails, marine gastropod molluscs in the family Cerithiopsidae. This genus was described by Rolan and Fernandez-Garcés, in 2008.

== Species ==
Species in the genus Cubalaskeya include:

- Cubalaskeya cubana Rolán & Fernández-Garcés, 2008
- Cubalaskeya machoi Espinosa, Ortea & Moro, 2008
- Cubalaskeya nivea (Faber, 2007)
