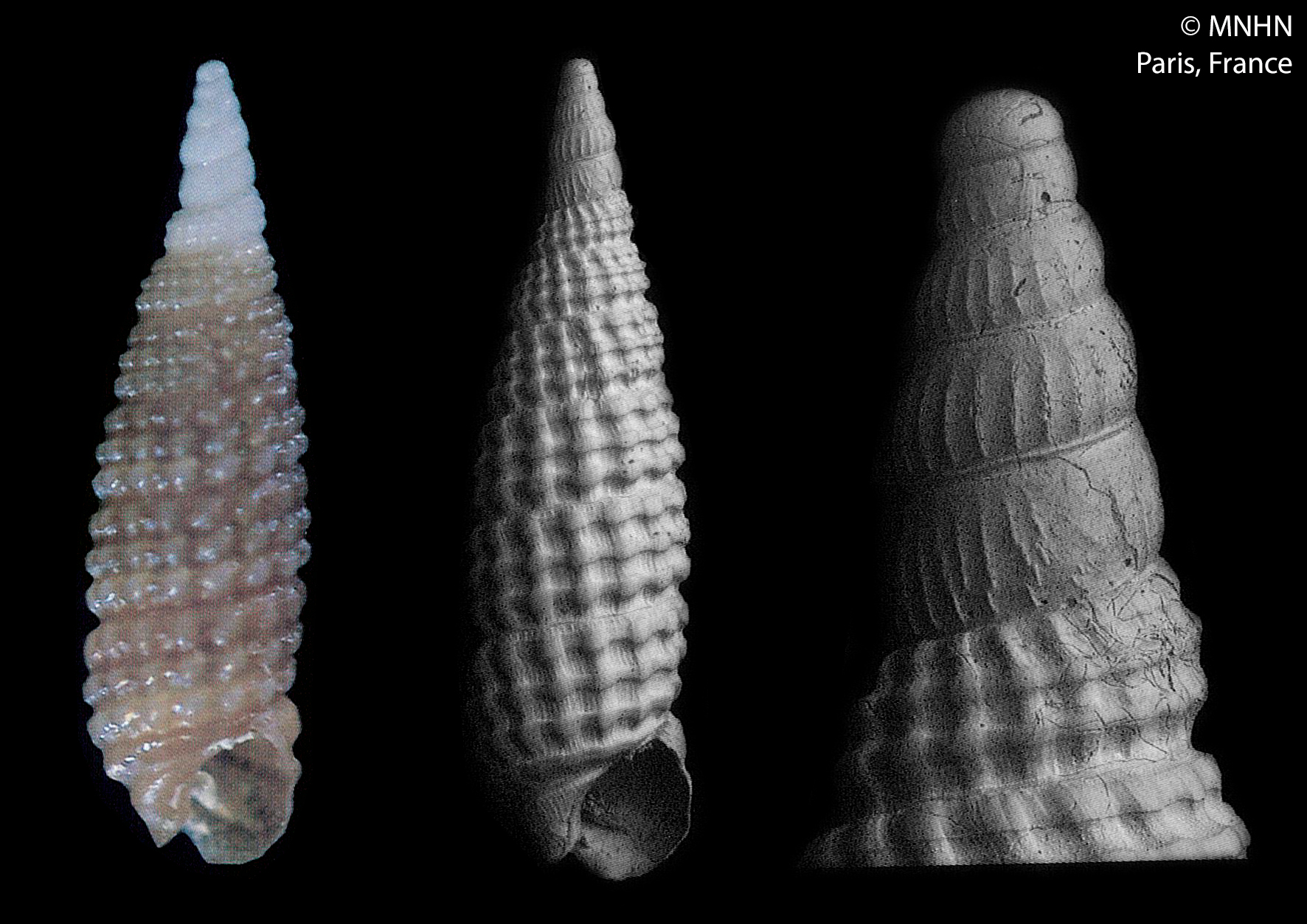
- Shell of Ondulopsis fusca (holotype at MNHN, Paris)

Scientific classification
- Kingdom: Animalia
- Phylum: Mollusca
- Class: Gastropoda
- Subclass: Caenogastropoda
- Order: incertae sedis
- Family: Cerithiopsidae
- Genus: Ondulopsis; Cecalupo & Perugia, 2012

Type species
- Ondulopsis annae Cecalupo & Perugia, 2012

= Ondulopsis =

Genus of gastropods

Ondulopsis is a genus of very small sea snails, marine gastropod molluscs in the family Cerithiopsidae.

== Species ==
- Ondulopsis annae Cecalupo & Perugia, 2012
- Ondulopsis conica Cecalupo & Perugia, 2012
- Ondulopsis fusca Cecalupo & Perugia, 2012
- Ondulopsis intricata Cecalupo & Perugia, 2012
- Ondulopsis tricolor Cecalupo & Perugia, 2012
- Ondulopsis turrita Cecalupo & Perugia, 2012
- Ondulopsis violacea Cecalupo & Perugia, 2012
