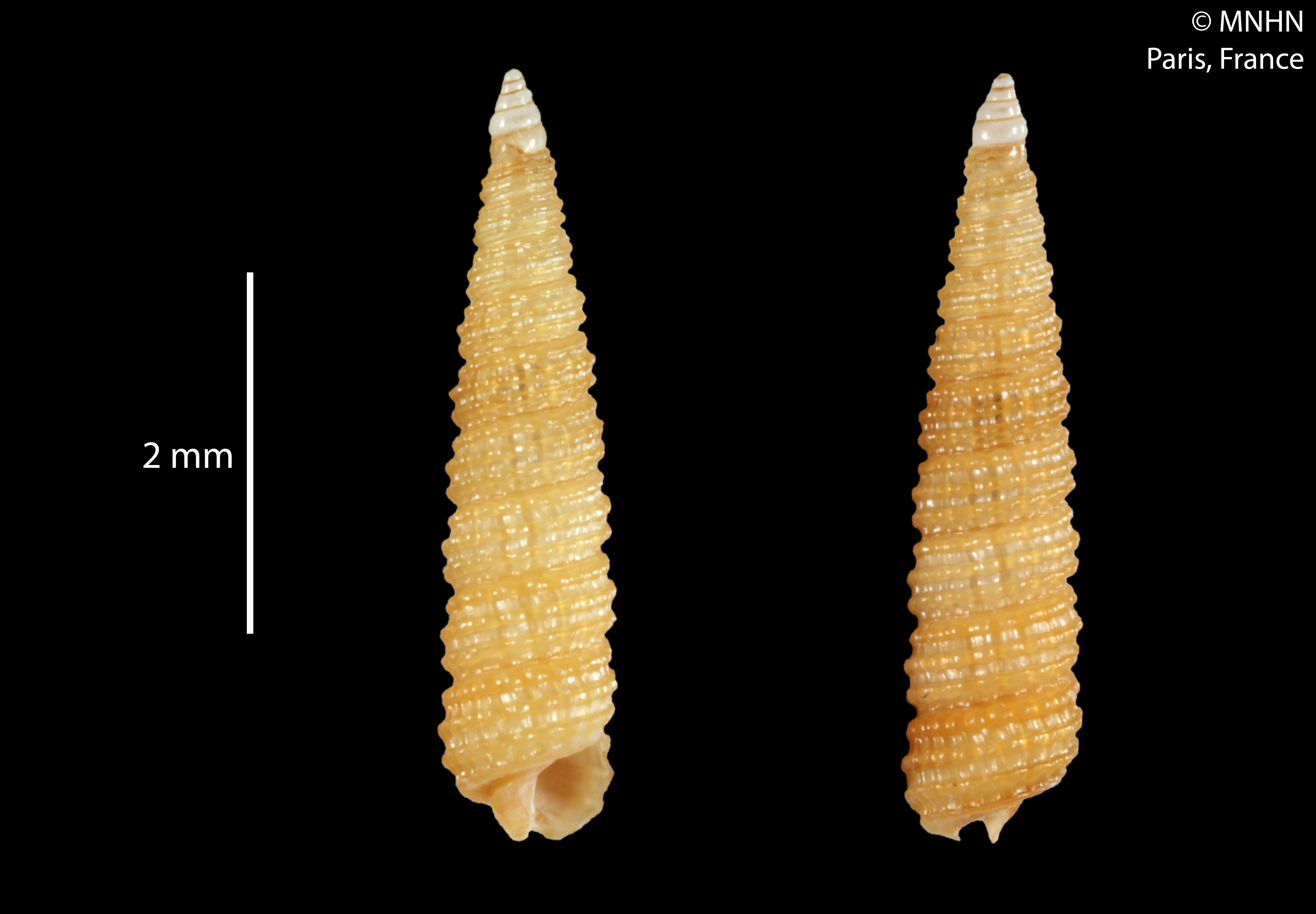
- Shell of Synthopsis hadfieldi (specimen at MNHN, Paris)

Scientific classification
- Kingdom: Animalia
- Phylum: Mollusca
- Class: Gastropoda
- Subclass: Caenogastropoda
- Order: incertae sedis
- Family: Cerithiopsidae
- Genus: Costulopsis
- Species: C. hadfieldi

Binomial name
- Costulopsis hadfieldi (Jay & Drivas, 2002)

Synonymsref name="WoRMS" />
- Cerithiopsis hadfieldi Jay & Drivas, 2002 (original combination); Nanopsis hadfieldi (Jay & Drivas, 2002); Synthopsis hadfieldi (Jay & Drivas, 2002)

= Costulopsis hadfieldi =

Species of gastropod

Costulopsis hadfieldi is a species of sea snail, a gastropod in the family Cerithiopsidae. It was described by Jay and Drivas, in 2002.

== Distribution ==
This marine species occurs off Madagascar.
