= Koilofera =

Scientific classification
- Kingdom: Animalia
- Phylum: Mollusca
- Class: Gastropoda
- Subclass: Caenogastropoda
- Order: incertae sedis
- Family: Cerithiopsidae
- Genus: Koilofera; M. Jay & Drivas, 2002
- Species: K. koilofera

Binomial name
- Koilofera koilofera M. Jay & Drivas, 2002

Genus of molluscs

Koilofera koilofera is a species of small sea snail, a marine gastropod mollusc in the family Cerithiopsidae. The species was described by Jay and Drivas in 2002. It is the only species in the genus Koilofera.
