= Speculum =

The term speculum, Latin for "mirror", and its plural specula, may refer to:

- Speculum (journal), a journal of medieval studies published by the Medieval Academy of America
- Speculum (medical), a medical tool used for examining body cavities
- Speculum feathers, the secondary feathers on the inner part of a duck's wing which are often brightly coloured
- Speculum literature, a medieval genre
- Speculum metal, an alloy containing copper and tin used for making all-metal mirrors
- "Speculum", a song by Adema from Adema (album)

== See also ==
- Specula (disambiguation)
- Spiculum, a Roman weapon
