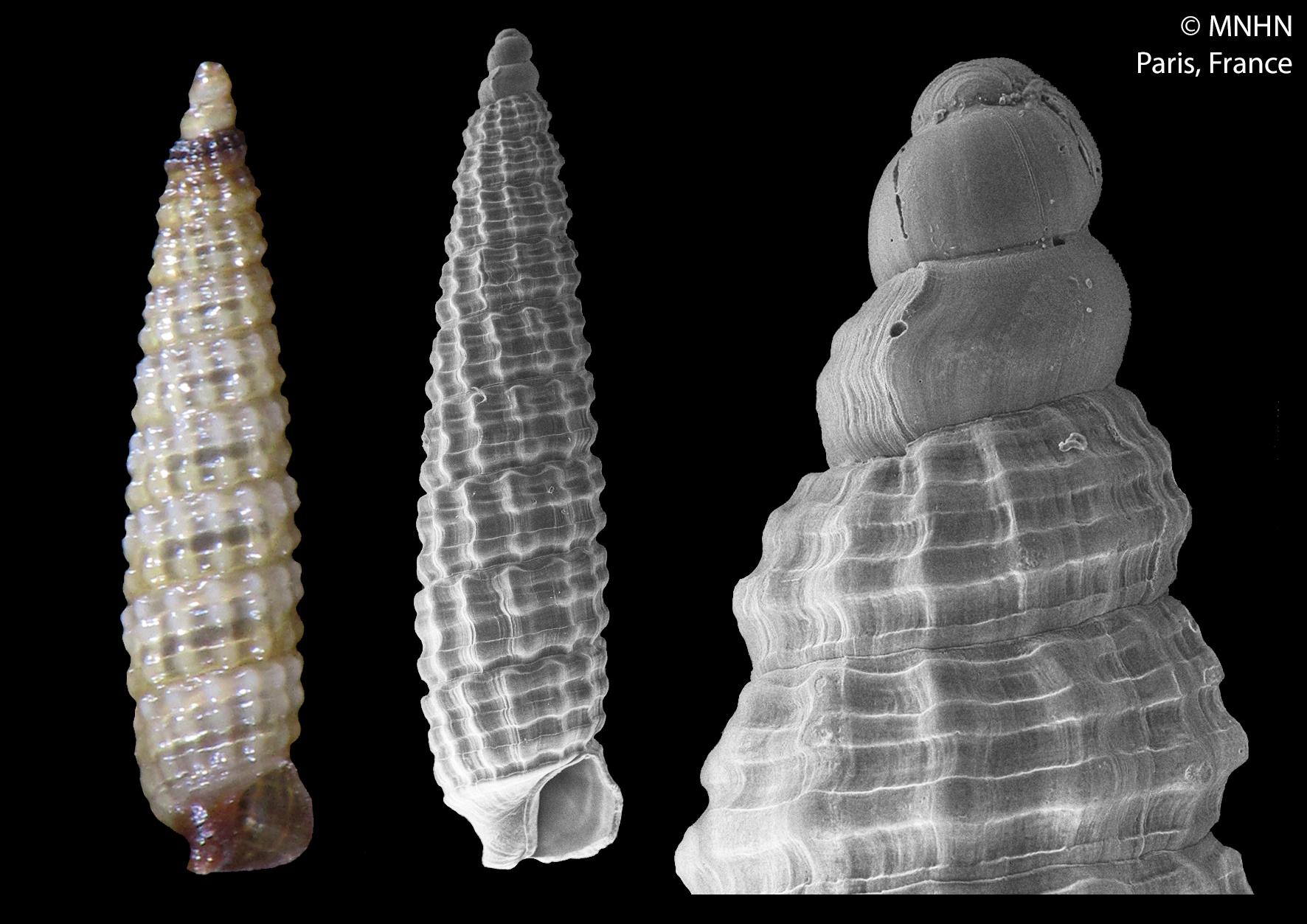
- Specula copiosa

Scientific classification
- Kingdom: Animalia
- Phylum: Mollusca
- Class: Gastropoda
- Subclass: Caenogastropoda
- Order: incertae sedis
- Family: Cerithiopsidae
- Genus: Specula; Finlay, 1926

Type species
- Cerithiopsis styliformis Suter, 1908

= Specula (gastropod) =

Genus of gastropods

Specula is a genus of minute sea snails, marine gastropod molluscs or micromolluscs in the family Cerithiopsidae.

== Species ==
Species in the genus Specula include:

- Specula agamennonei Cecalupo & Perugia, 2019
- Specula albengai Cecalupo & Perugia, 2013
- Specula angelobaraggiai Cecalupo & Perugia, 2021
- Specula bicolor Cecalupo & Perugia, 2012
- Specula bogii Cecalupo & Perugia, 2021
- Specula boholensis Cecalupo & Perugia, 2012
- Specula campbellica (A. W. B. Powell, 1955)
- Specula churamaris Cecalupo & Perugia, 2019
- Specula copiosa Cecalupo & Perugia, 2012
- Specula dagostinoi Cecalupo & Perugia, 2017
- Specula dimatteoi Cecalupo & Perugia, 2017
- Specula dubia Cecalupo & Perugia, 2013
- Specula dumasi Cecalupo & Perugia, 2013
- Specula fragilis Cecalupo & Perugia, 2012
- Specula giamminellii Cecalupo & Perugia, 2014
- Specula giustii Cecalupo & Perugia, 2021
- Specula guttula Cecalupo & Perugia, 2017
- Specula jumeauensis Cecalupo & Perugia, 2021
- Specula laetae Cecalupo & Perugia, 2012
- Specula mammilla (May, 1919)
- Specula menoui Cecalupo & Perugia, 2017
- Specula moalboalensis Cecalupo & Perugia, 2012
- Specula molini Cecalupo & Perugia, 2013
- Specula naoae Cecalupo & Perugia, 2019
- Specula pelorcei Cecalupo & Perugia, 2013
- Specula perplexa Cecalupo & Perugia, 2017
- Specula petitdevoizei Cecalupo & Perugia, 2013
- Specula puillandrei Cecalupo & Perugia, 2013
- Specula pulchella Cecalupo & Perugia, 2012
- Specula pusilla Cecalupo & Perugia, 2013
- Specula queenslandica Laseron, 1956
- Specula regina Cotton, 1951
- Specula retifera (Suter, 1908)
- Specula ruali Cecalupo & Perugia, 2017
- Specula santalensis Cecalupo & Perugia, 2017
- Specula seragakiensis Cecalupo & Perugia, 2019
- Specula servadeii Cecalupo & Perugia, 2017
- Specula solai Cecalupo & Perugia, 2014
- Specula styliformis (Suter, 1908)
- Specula subcastanea Cecalupo & Perugia, 2018
- Specula turbonilloides (Tenison-Woods, 1879)
- Specula vilvilfarei Cecalupo & Perugia, 2013

Species brought into synonymy

- Specula canaliculata (Suter, 1908): synonym of Specula retifera (Suter, 1908)
- Specula dissimilis (Suter, 1908): synonym of Specula styliformis (Suter, 1908)
- † Specula infelix Marwick, 1931: synonym of † Cerithiella infelix (Marwick, 1931) (original combination)
- Specula marginata (Suter, 1908): synonym of Mendax marginata (Suter, 1908)
- Specula odhneri (Powell, 1927) : synonym of Mendax trizonalis odhneri (Powell, 1927)
- Specula sassieri Cecalupo & Perugia, 2020: synonym of Phosinella sagraiana (d'Orbigny, 1842)
- Specula widmeriana Cecalupo & Perugia, 2014 : synonym of Sundaya widmeriana (Cecalupo & Perugia, 2014)
