= Mendax marginatus =

Scientific classification
- Kingdom: Animalia
- Phylum: Mollusca
- Class: Gastropoda
- Subclass: Caenogastropoda
- Order: incertae sedis
- Family: Cerithiopsidae
- Genus: Mendax
- Species: M. marginatus

Binomial name
- Mendax marginatus (Suter, 1908)

Synonyms
- Cerithiopsis marginata Suter, 1908; Specula marginata (Suter, 1908)

Species of gastropod

Mendax marginatus is a species of small sea snail, a marine gastropod mollusc in the family Cerithiopsidae.

== Distribution ==
This marine species is endemic to New Zealand.
