= Zaclys =

Scientific classification
- Kingdom: Animalia
- Phylum: Mollusca
- Class: Gastropoda
- Subclass: Caenogastropoda
- Order: incertae sedis
- Family: Cerithiopsidae
- Genus: Zaclys; Finlay, 1926

Genus of molluscs

Zaclys is a genus of gastropods belonging to the family Cerithiopsidae.

The species of this genus are found in Australia and New Zealand.

Species:

- Zaclys clathrata (Angas, 1871)
- Zaclys murdochi Marshall, 1978
