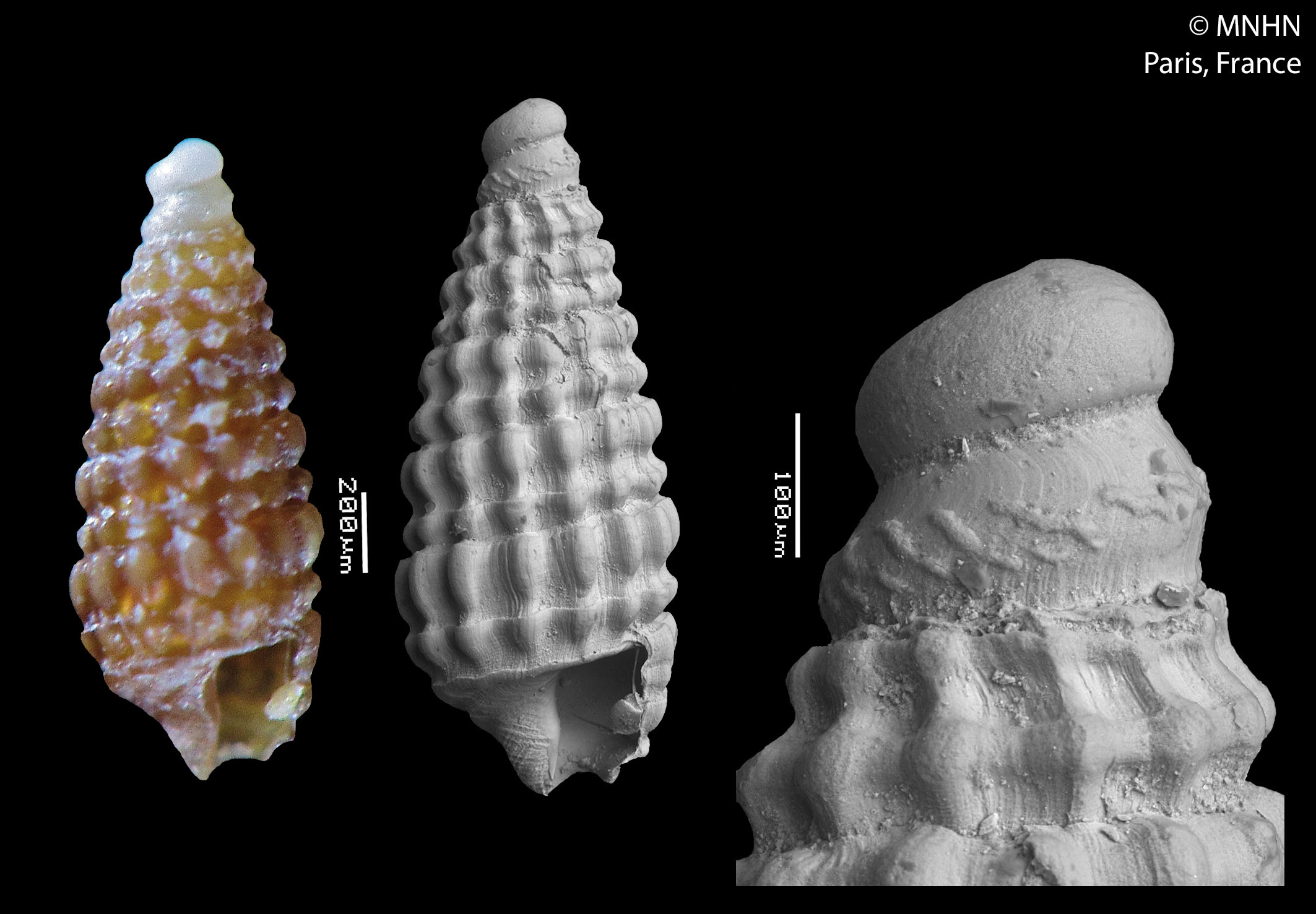
- Shell of Marshallopsis anceps (holotype at MNHN, Paris)

Scientific classification
- Kingdom: Animalia
- Phylum: Mollusca
- Class: Gastropoda
- Subclass: Caenogastropoda
- Order: incertae sedis
- Family: Cerithiopsidae
- Genus: Marshallopsis; Cecalupo & Perugia, 2012

Type species
- Marshallopsis albachiarae Cecalupo & Perugia, 2012

= Marshallopsis =

Genus of gastropods

Marshallopsis is a genus of minute sea snails, marine gastropod molluscs in the family Cerithiopsidae.

== Species ==
Species in the genus Marshallopsis include:

- Marshallopsis aboreensis Cecalupo & Perugia, 2017
- Marshallopsis albachiarae Cecalupo & Perugia, 2012
- Marshallopsis albicans Cecalupo & Perugia, 2012
- Marshallopsis anceps Cecalupo & Perugia, 2013
- Marshallopsis atrata Cecalupo & Perugia, 2012
- Marshallopsis bazzocchii Cecalupo & Perugia, 2014
- Marshallopsis blanda Cecalupo & Perugia, 2012
- Marshallopsis boucheti Cecalupo & Perugia, 2012
- Marshallopsis chirlii Cecalupo & Perugia, 2014
- Marshallopsis flavescens Cecalupo & Perugia, 2013
- Marshallopsis gattellii Cecalupo & Perugia, 2012
- Marshallopsis gofasi Cecalupo & Perugia, 2017
- Marshallopsis granosa Cecalupo & Perugia, 2012
- Marshallopsis jolandae Cecalupo & Perugia, 2013
- Marshallopsis kantori Cecalupo & Perugia, 2013
- Marshallopsis letourneuxi Cecalupo & Perugia, 2014
- Marshallopsis limpida Cecalupo & Perugia, 2012
- Marshallopsis lorenzoi Cecalupo & Perugia, 2012
- Marshallopsis maesta Cecalupo & Perugia, 2012
- Marshallopsis melanesiana Cecalupo & Perugia, 2013
- Marshallopsis nagoensis Cecalupo & Perugia, 2018
- Marshallopsis perinii Cecalupo & Perugia, 2013
- Marshallopsis persicina Cecalupo & Perugia, 2018
- Marshallopsis sabellii Cecalupo & Perugia, 2019
- Marshallopsis spadicea Cecalupo & Perugia, 2018
- Marshallopsis spinosa Cecalupo & Perugia, 2013
- Marshallopsis tahitiensis Cecalupo & Perugia, 2014
- Marshallopsis troendlei Cecalupo & Perugia, 2014
- Marshallopsis turgida Cecalupo & Perugia, 2012
- Marshallopsis tutubaensis Cecalupo & Perugia, 2013
- Marshallopsis utriculus Cecalupo & Perugia, 2017

Species brought into synonymy

- Marshallopsis inopinata Cecalupo & Perugia, 2012: synonym of Prolixodens inopinata (Cecalupo & Perugia, 2012)
- Marshallopsis lutea Cecalupo & Perugia, 2012: synonym of Prolixodens lutea (Cecalupo & Perugia, 2012)
- Marshallopsis obscura Cecalupo & Perugia, 2012: synonym of Prolixodens obscura (Cecalupo & Perugia, 2012)
