= Aliptina =

Scientific classification
- Kingdom: Animalia
- Phylum: Mollusca
- Class: Gastropoda
- Subclass: Caenogastropoda
- Order: incertae sedis
- Family: Cerithiopsidae
- Genus: Aliptina
- Species: A. acheronae

Binomial name
- Aliptina acheronae Marshall, 1978

Genus of molluscs

Aliptina acheronae is a very small species of sea snail in the family Cerithiopsidae, and the only species in the genus Aliptina. It was described by Marshall in 1978.
