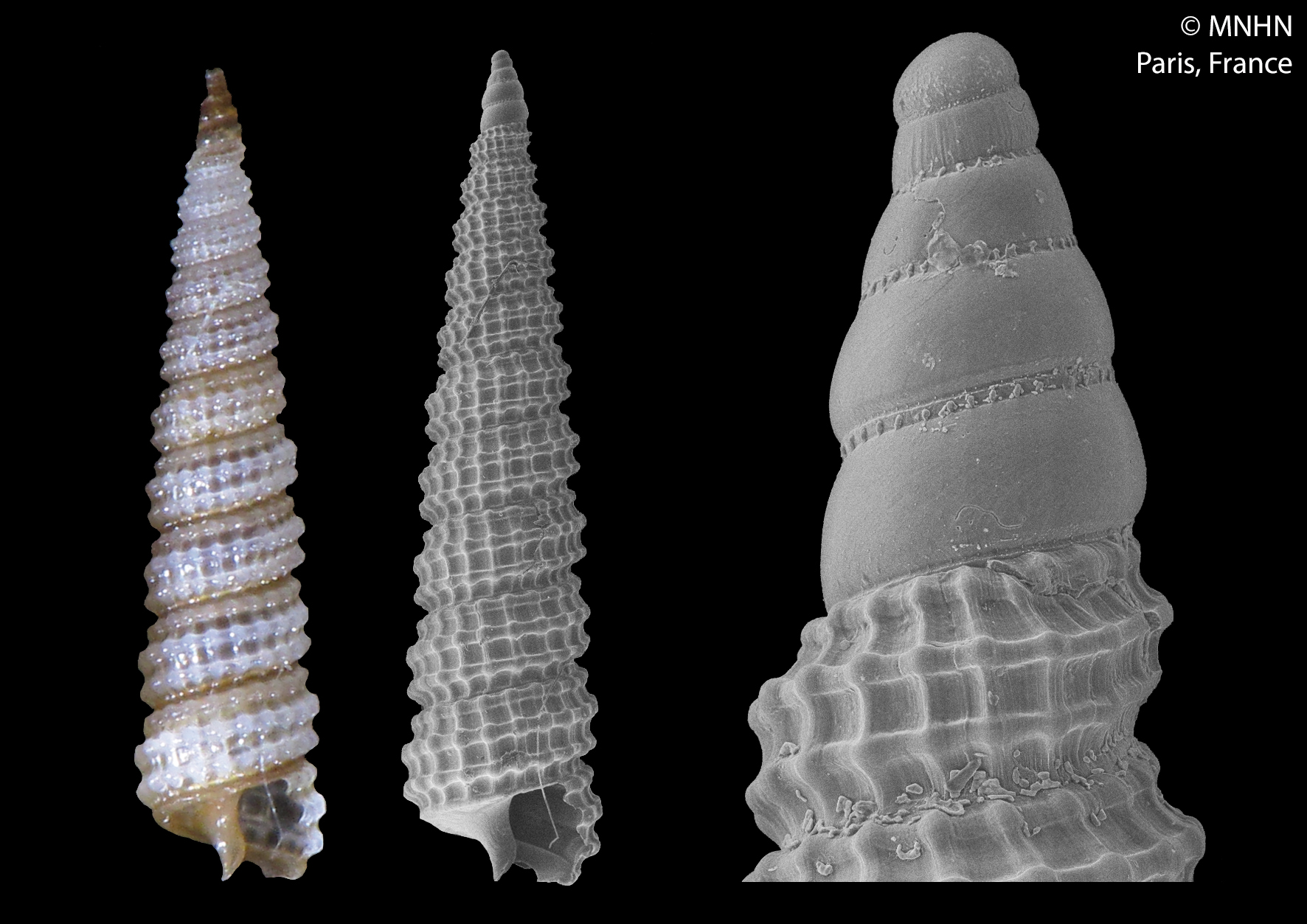
- Shell of Costulopsis poppearum (specimen at MNHN, Paris)

Scientific classification
- Kingdom: Animalia
- Phylum: Mollusca
- Class: Gastropoda
- Subclass: Caenogastropoda
- Order: incertae sedis
- Family: Cerithiopsidae
- Genus: Costulopsis; Cecalupo & Robba, 2019

Type species
- Cerithiopsis tubercularis var. nana Jeffreys, 1867

Synonyms
- Nanopsis Cecalupo & Robba, 2010 (invalid: junior homonym of Nanopsis Henningsmoen, 1954 [Ostracoda]; Costulopsis is a replacement name)

= Costulopsis =

Genus of gastropods

Costulopsis is a genus of minute sea snails, marine gastropod molluscs in the family Cerithiopsidae.

== Species ==
Species in the genus Costulopsis include:

- Costulopsis adusta (Cecalupo & Perugia, 2018)
- Costulopsis albocincta (Melvill & Standen, 1896)
- Costulopsis ambigua (Cecalupo & Perugia, 2013)
- Costulopsis buzzurroi (Cecalupo & Robba, 2010)
- Costulopsis denticulata (Cecalupo & Robba, 2010)
- Costulopsis granata (Kay, 1979)
- Costulopsis hadfieldi (Jay & Drivas, 2002)
- Costulopsis impedita (Cecalupo & Perugia, 2012)
- Costulopsis iuxtafuniculata (Rolán, Espinosa & Fernández-Garcés, 2007)
- Costulopsis mactanensis (Cecalupo & Perugia, 2012)
- Costulopsis myia (Jay & Drivas, 2002)
- Costulopsis nana (Jeffreys, 1867)
- Costulopsis noninii (Cecalupo & Perugia, 2012)
- Costulopsis pickeringae (Jay & Drivas, 2002)
- Costulopsis poppearum (Cecalupo & Perugia, 2012)
- Costulopsis skolix (Jay & Drivas, 2002)
- Costulopsis tenuicolorata (Cecalupo & Perugia, 2012)

Species brought into synonymy

- Costulopsis albovittata (C. B. Adams, 1850): synonym of Cerithiopsis albovittata (C. B. Adams, 1850)
- Costulopsis beneitoi (Rolán, Espinosa & Fernández-Garcés, 2007): synonym of Cerithiopsis beneitoi Rolán, Espinosa & Fernández-Garcés, 2007
- Costulopsis familiarum (Rolán, Espinosa & Fernández-Garcés, 2007): synonym of Cerithiopsis familiarum Rolán, Espinosa & Fernández-Garcés, 2007
- Costulopsis parvada (Rolán, Espinosa & Fernández-Garcés, 2007): synonym of Cerithiopsis parvada Rolán, Espinosa & Fernández-Garcés, 2007
