= Krachiopsis =

Scientific classification
- Kingdom: Animalia
- Phylum: Mollusca
- Class: Gastropoda
- Subclass: Caenogastropoda
- Order: incertae sedis
- Family: Cerithiopsidae
- Genus: Krachiopsis; Smriglio & Mariottini, 1999
- Species: K. giannuzzii

Binomial name
- Krachiopsis giannuzzii Smriglio & Mariottini, 1999

Species of mollusc

Krachiopsis is a genus of minute marine gastropod molluscs in the family Cerithiopsidae. Its only species is Krachiopsis giannuzzii. The species was described by Smriglio and Mariottini in 1999.
