= Alipta =

Scientific classification
- Kingdom: Animalia
- Phylum: Mollusca
- Class: Gastropoda
- Subclass: Caenogastropoda
- Order: incertae sedis
- Family: Cerithiopsidae
- Genus: Alipta; Finlay, 1948

Species
- See text

Genus of gastropods

Alipta is a genus of very small sea snails, marine gastropod molluscs in the family Cerithiopsidae.

== Species ==
Species in the genus Alipta include:

- Alipta crenistria (Suter, 1907)
