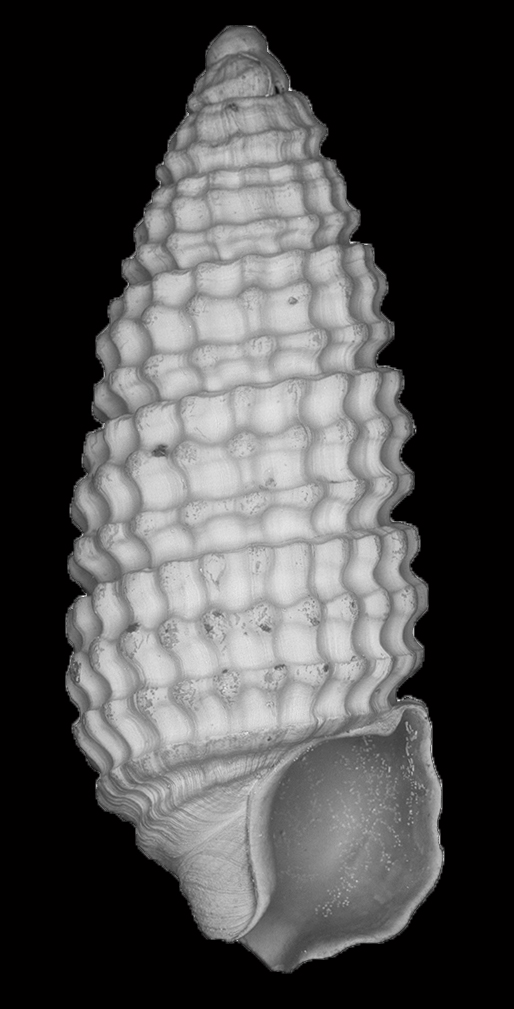
- Shell of Sundaya soubzmaignei (holotype at MNHN, Paris)

Scientific classification
- Kingdom: Animalia
- Phylum: Mollusca
- Class: Gastropoda
- Subclass: Caenogastropoda
- Clade: Hypsogastropoda
- Suborder: Ptenoglossa
- Superfamily: Triphoroidea
- Family: Cerithiopsidae
- Genus: Sundaya; W. R. B. Oliver, 1915

Type species
- Sundaya exquisita W. R. B. Oliver, 1915

= Sundaya =

Genus of gastropods

Sundaya is a genus of sea snails in the family Cerithiopsidae.

== Characteristics ==
(Original description) The shell is pupoid in shape, with an obtuse apex and gently convex sides. The protoconch is minute, consisting of a single whorl. The body whorl contracts anteriorly into a nearly straight siphonal canal and is ornamented with nodulose spiral ribs.

== Species ==
- Sundaya bancheti Cecalupo & Perugia, 2017
- Sundaya bargibanti Cecalupo & Perugia, 2017
- Sundaya ericae Cecalupo & Perugia, 2018
- Sundaya exquisita W. R. B. Oliver, 1915
- Sundaya laboutei Cecalupo & Perugia, 2017
- Sundaya poigounei Cecalupo & Perugia, 2017
- Sundaya pupoides Cecalupo & Perugia, 2024
- Sundaya rigneusae Cecalupo & Perugia, 2017
- Sundaya rufula Cecalupo & Perugia, 2024
- Sundaya spurca Cecalupo & Perugia, 2017
- Sundaya tuberculata Powell, 1927
- Sundaya widmeriana (Cecalupo & Perugia, 2014)

Species brought into synonymy

- Sundaya campbellica A. W. B. Powell, 1955: synonym of Specula campbellica (Powell, 1955)
- Sundaya soubzmaignei Cecalupo & Perugia, 2020: synonym of Cerithiopsis soubzmaignei (Cecalupo & Perugia, 2020) (superseded combination)
