= Belonimorphis =

Scientific classification
- Kingdom: Animalia
- Phylum: Mollusca
- Class: Gastropoda
- Subclass: Caenogastropoda
- Order: incertae sedis
- Family: Cerithiopsidae
- Genus: Belonimorphis; Jay & Drivas, 2002

Type species
- Belonimorphis belonimorphis Jay & Drivas, 2002

Genus of gastropods

Belonimorphis is a small genus of sea snails comprising five species:

- Belonimorphis ballardi Cecalupo & Perugia, 2013
- Belonimorphis belonimorphis Jay & Drivas, 2002
- Belonimorphis cubensis (Rolán & Espinosa, 1992)
- Belonimorphis jayi Cecalupo & Perugia, 2021
- Belonimorphis touhoensis Cecalupo & Perugia, 2017
