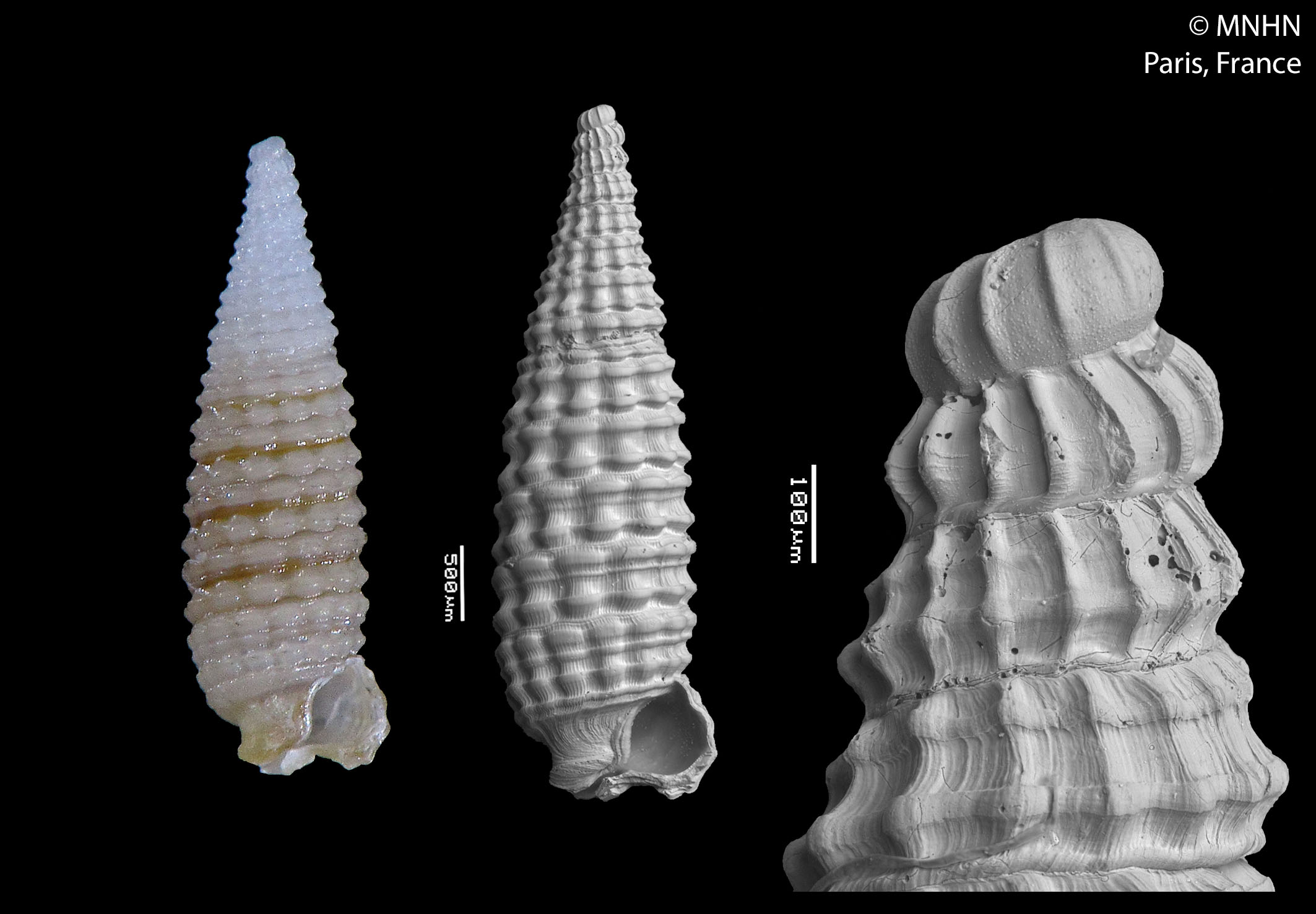
- Shell of Mendax rufulus (holotype at MNHN, Paris)

Scientific classification
- Kingdom: Animalia
- Phylum: Mollusca
- Class: Gastropoda
- Subclass: Caenogastropoda
- Order: incertae sedis
- Family: Cerithiopsidae
- Genus: Mendax; Finlay, 1948

Type species
- Cerithiopsis trizonalis Odhner, 1924

Synonyms
- Specula (Mendax) Finlay, 1926

= Mendax (gastropod) =

Genus of gastropods

Mendax is a genus of very small sea snails, marine gastropod molluscs in the family Cerithiopsidae.

== Species ==
Species in the genus Mendax include:

- Mendax barbarae Cecalupo & Perugia, 2017
- Mendax denatalis Cecalupo & Perugia, 2017
- † Mendax disparilis P. A. Maxwell, 1992
- Mendax marginatus (Suter, 1908)
- Mendax mascarenensis Jay & Drivas, 2002
- Mendax metivieri Jay & Drivas, 2002
- Mendax odhneri (A. W. B. Powell, 1927)
- Mendax penneyi Jay & Drivas, 2002
- Mendax ribesae Jay & Drivas, 2002
- Mendax rufulus Cecalupo & Perugia, 2013
- Mendax samadiae Cecalupo & Perugia, 2021
- Mendax seilaformis Marshall, 1978
- Mendax spiritussanctis Cecalupo & Perugia, 2013
- Mendax subapicinus (Dell, 1956)
- Mendax tenuicostatus Cecalupo & Perugia, 2017
- Mendax theodosiae Jay & Drivas, 2002
- Mendax trizonalis (Odhner, 1924)

Species brought into synonymy

- Mendax attenuatispira Powell, 1937: synonym of Trituba (Paramendax) attenuatispira (Powell, 1937) represented as Trituba attenuatispira (Powell, 1937)
- Mendax duplicarinata Powell, 1940: synonym of Metaxia duplicarinata (Powell, 1940) (original combination)
- Mendax hebetatus Marshall, 1978: synonym of Cerithiella hebetata (B. A. Marshall, 1978) (superseded combination)
- Mendax nucleoproducta Dell, 1956: synonym of Cerithiella nucleoproducta (Dell, 1956) (original combination)
- Mendax trizonaloides Marshall, 1978: synonym of Onchodia trizonaloides (B. A. Marshall, 1978) (superseded combination)
