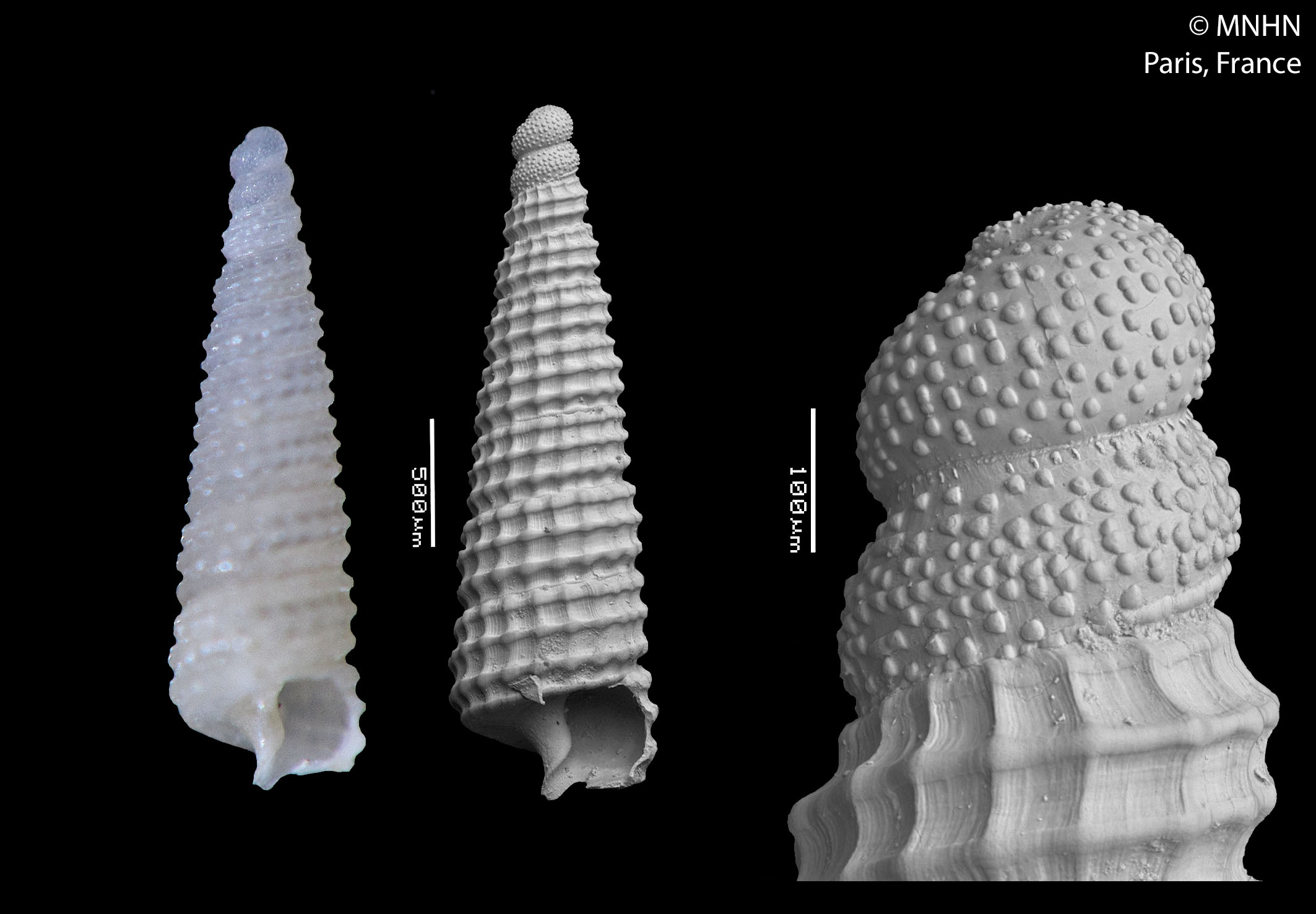
- Shell of Tubercliopsis cataldinii (holotype at MNHN, Paris)

Scientific classification
- Kingdom: Animalia
- Phylum: Mollusca
- Class: Gastropoda
- Subclass: Caenogastropoda
- Order: incertae sedis
- Superfamily: Triphoroidea
- Family: Cerithiopsidae
- Genus: Tubercliopsis; Laseron, 1956

Type species
- Tubercliopsis capricornia Laseron, 1956

= Tubercliopsis =

Genus of gastropods

Tubercliopsis is a genus of very small sea snails, marine gastropod molluscs in the family Cerithiopsidae, the cerithids.

== Species ==
- Tubercliopsis bowenensis Laseron, 1956
- Tubercliopsis capricornia Laseron, 1956
- Tubercliopsis cataldinii Cecalupo & Perugia, 2013
- Tubercliopsis cessicus (Hedley, 1906)
- Tubercliopsis conica Cecalupo & Perugia, 2012
- Tubercliopsis elongata Laseron, 1956
- Tubercliopsis exigua (Laseron, 1951)
- Tubercliopsis filofusca (Laseron, 1951)
- Tubercliopsis georgensis (Laseron, 1951)
- Tubercliopsis lanceolata Cecalupo & Perugia, 2013
- Tubercliopsis lata Laseron, 1956
- Tubercliopsis literalis (Laseron, 1951)
- Tubercliopsis lorenzoi Cecalupo & Perugia, 2012
- Tubercliopsis macalpinei (Laseron, 1951)
- Tubercliopsis maxi Cecalupo & Perugia, 2012
- Tubercliopsis minor Cecalupo & Perugia, 2012
- Tubercliopsis miranda Cecalupo & Perugia, 2012
- Tubercliopsis philippinensis Cecalupo & Perugia, 2012
- Tubercliopsis punicea Laseron, 1956
- Tubercliopsis sebyi Cecalupo & Perugia, 2012
- Tubercliopsis septapilia (Laseron, 1951)
- Tubercliopsis subtilis Cecalupo & Perugia, 2018
- Tubercliopsis violacea Cecalupo & Perugia, 2012

SDynonyms

- Tubercliopsis dannevigi (Hedley, 1911): synonym of Prolixodens dannevigi (Hedley, 1911)
- Tubercliopsis infracolor (Laseron, 1951): synonym of Prolixodens infracolor (Laseron, 1951)
- Tubercliopsis quinquepilia (Laseron, 1951): synonym of Clathropsis quinquepilia (Laseron, 1951)
- Tubercliopsis septipilia [sic]: synonym of Tubercliopsis septapilia (Laseron, 1951) (misspelling)
- Tubercliopsis turgida Cecalupo & Perugia, 2012: synonym of Synthopsis noninii Cecalupo & Perugia, 2012: synonym of Costulopsis noninii (Cecalupo & Perugia, 2012)
