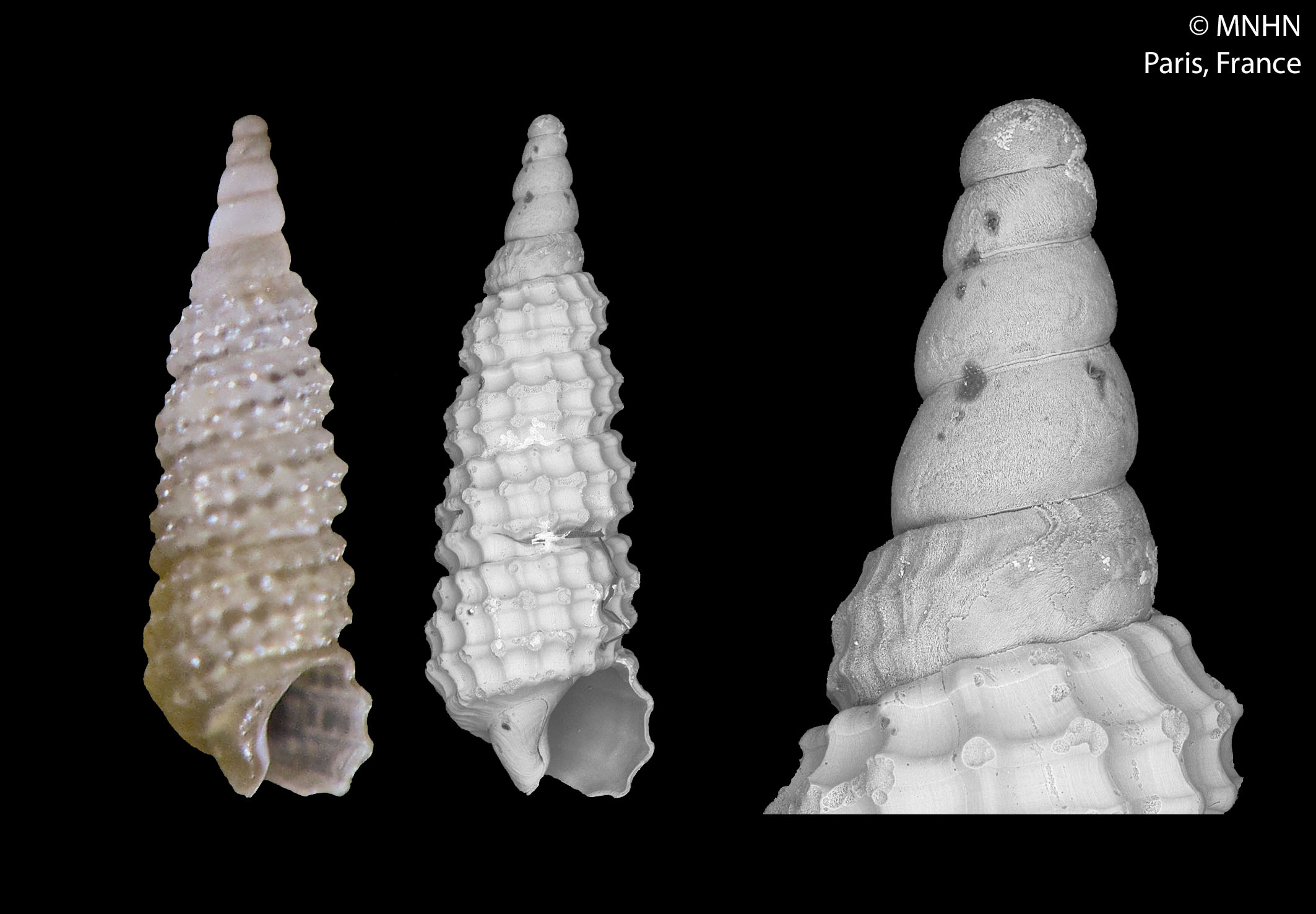
- Shell of Clathropsis abelai (holotype at MNHN, Paris)

Scientific classification
- Kingdom: Animalia
- Phylum: Mollusca
- Class: Gastropoda
- Subclass: Caenogastropoda
- Order: incertae sedis
- Family: Cerithiopsidae
- Genus: Clathropsis; Laseron, 1956

Type species
- Clathropsis impedita Laseron, 1956

= Clathropsis =

Genus of gastropods

Clathropsis is a genus of minute sea snails, marine gastropod molluscs in the family Cerithiopsidae.

== Species ==
Species in the genus Clathropsis include:

- Clathropsis abelai Cecalupo & Perugia, 2014
- Clathropsis acutissima Cecalupo & Perugia, 2013
- Clathropsis adenensis Cecalupo & Perugia, 2023
- Clathropsis albida Cecalupo & Perugia, 2019
- Clathropsis alternata (Laseron, 1951)
- Clathropsis annelaurae Cecalupo & Perugia, 2018
- Clathropsis apexlevis Cecalupo & Perugia, 2017
- Clathropsis araii Cecalupo & Perugia, 2019
- Clathropsis arcangelae Cecalupo & Perugia, 2017
- Clathropsis atimovatae Cecalupo & Perugia, 2014
- Clathropsis berthaultorum Cecalupo & Perugia, 2017
- Clathropsis bicarinata (Laseron, 1951)
- Clathropsis bugeae Cecalupo & Perugia, 2014
- Clathropsis caledonica Cecalupo & Perugia, 2017
- Clathropsis castelinae Cecalupo & Perugia, 2014
- Clathropsis cesairei Cecalupo & Perugia, 2014
- Clathropsis charlesi Cecalupo & Perugia, 2014
- Clathropsis chatenayi Cecalupo & Perugia, 2017
- Clathropsis chinoi Cecalupo & Perugia, 2019
- Clathropsis corbariae Cecalupo & Perugia, 2014
- Clathropsis coronata Cecalupo & Perugia, 2016
- Clathropsis cuspidiformis Cecalupo & Perugia, 2017
- Clathropsis darwinensis Laseron, 1956
- Clathropsis doimanensis Cecalupo & Perugia, 2017
- Clathropsis ellenstrongae Cecalupo & Perugia, 2012
- Clathropsis eugenei Cecalupo & Perugia, 2014
- Clathropsis fulvocincta Cecalupo & Perugia, 2019
- Clathropsis fuzzii Cecalupo & Perugia, 2014
- Clathropsis gemmunziae Cecalupo & Perugia, 2017
- Clathropsis germanai Cecalupo & Perugia, 2018
- Clathropsis gilvusfasciata Cecalupo & Perugia, 2023
- Clathropsis iheyaensis Cecalupo & Perugia, 2019
- Clathropsis impedita Laseron, 1956
- Clathropsis joannotae Cecalupo & Perugia, 2017
- Clathropsis kolasinskiae Cecalupo & Perugia, 2021
- Clathropsis lamyi (Jay & Drivas, 2002)
- Clathropsis laurenti Cecalupo & Perugia, 2017
- Clathropsis lifouensis Cecalupo & Perugia, 2017
- Clathropsis lorenzinii Cecalupo & Perugia, 2012
- Clathropsis luteocincta Cecalupo & Perugia, 2013
- Clathropsis mafeaensis Cecalupo & Perugia, 2013
- Clathropsis marinesqueae Cecalupo & Perugia, 2021
- Clathropsis maritima Laseron, 1956
- Clathropsis marshalli Cecalupo & Perugia, 2017
- Clathropsis matsukii Cecalupo & Perugia, 2019
- Clathropsis mellita Laseron, 1956
- Clathropsis multispirae Cecalupo & Perugia, 2012
- Clathropsis okutanii Cecalupo & Perugia, 2019
- Clathropsis oliverioi Cecalupo & Perugia, 2018
- Clathropsis omanensis Cecalupo & Perugia, 2022
- Clathropsis ornata Cecalupo & Perugia, 2014
- Clathropsis pallens Cecalupo & Perugia, 2012
- Clathropsis payriae Cecalupo & Perugia, 2014
- Clathropsis peculiaris Cecalupo & Perugia, 2014
- Clathropsis pianii Cecalupo & Perugia, 2018
- Clathropsis pinedai Cecalupo & Perugia, 2013
- Clathropsis pulchella Cecalupo & Perugia, 2012
- Clathropsis quaterstriata Cecalupo & Perugia, 2012
- Clathropsis rendai Cecalupo & Perugia, 2018
- Clathropsis repettoi Cecalupo & Perugia, 2018
- Clathropsis semiclara Cecalupo & Perugia, 2012
- Clathropsis serenamirrii Cecalupo & Perugia, 2021
- Clathropsis sparacioi Cecalupo & Perugia, 2018
- Clathropsis subrosea Cecalupo & Perugia, 2013
- Clathropsis suezensis Cecalupo & Perugia, 2023
- Clathropsis tavianii Cecalupo & Perugia, 2018
- Clathropsis thornleyana Laseron, 1956
- Clathropsis tripilia (Laseron, 1951)
- Clathropsis tuanainaii Cecalupo & Perugia, 2014
- Clathropsis turreta Laseron, 1956
- Clathropsis zamamiensis Cecalupo & Perugia, 2019
- Clathropsis zannii Cecalupo & Perugia, 2012

Species brought into synonymy

- Clathropsis poppearum Cecalupo & Perugia, 2012: synonym of Costulopsis poppearum (Cecalupo & Perugia, 2012) (original combination)
