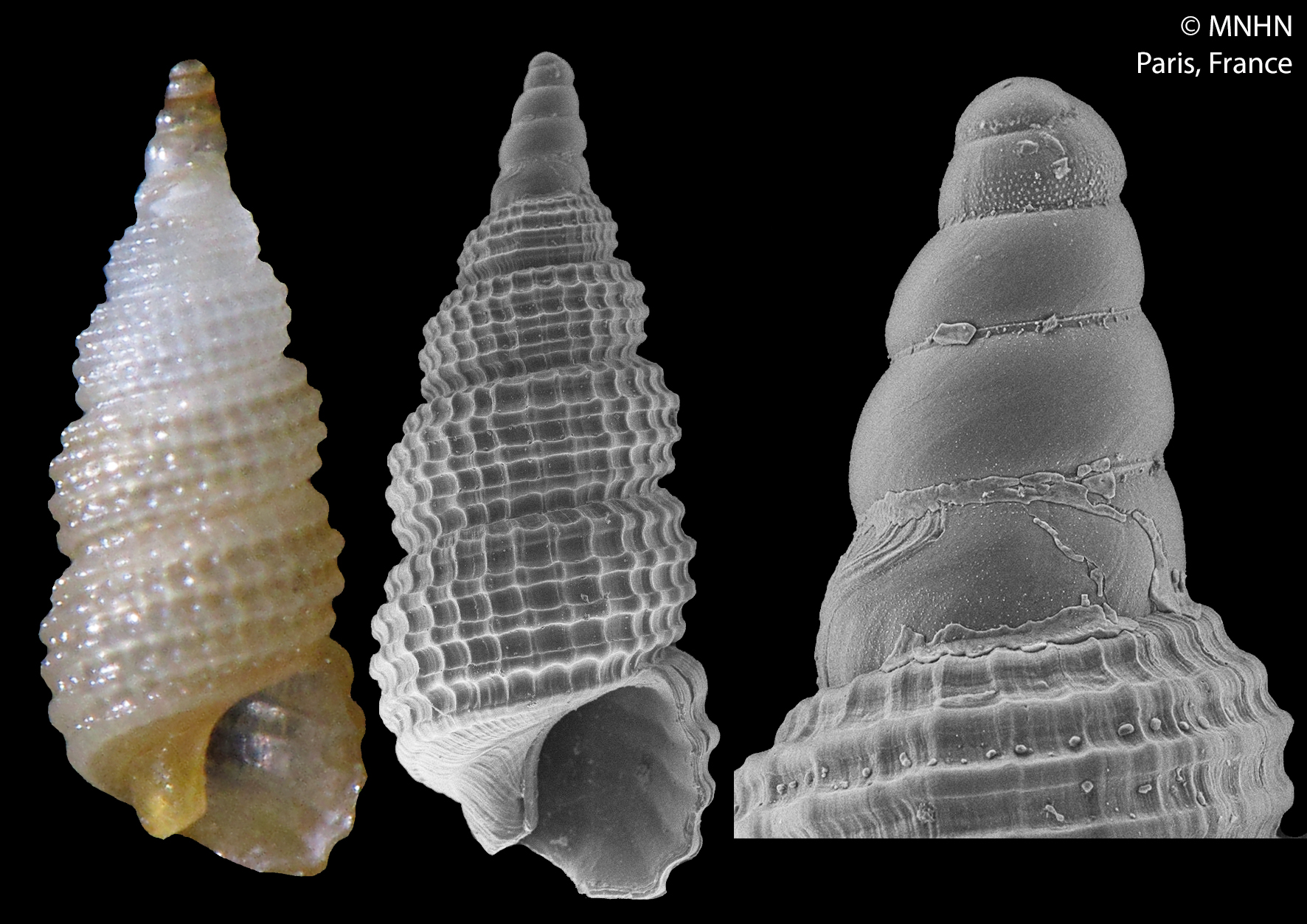
- Shell of Granulopsis thelcterium (specimen at MNHN, Paris)

Scientific classification
- Kingdom: Animalia
- Phylum: Mollusca
- Class: Gastropoda
- Subclass: Caenogastropoda
- Order: incertae sedis
- Family: Cerithiopsidae
- Genus: Granulopsis; Cecalupo & Perugia, 2012

Type species
- Callisteuma thelcterium Tomlin, 1929

Synonyms
- Callisteuma Tomlin, 1929 (invalid: junior homonym of Callisteuma Prout, 1912 [Lepidoptera]; Granulopsis is a replacement name)

= Granulopsis =

Genus of gastropods

Granulopsis is a genus of minute sea snails, marine gastropod molluscs in the family Cerithiopsidae.

== Species ==
Species in the genus Granulopsis include:

- Granulopsis thelcterium (Tomlin, 1929)
- Granulopsis vitisabrinae Cecalupo & Perugia, 2018
