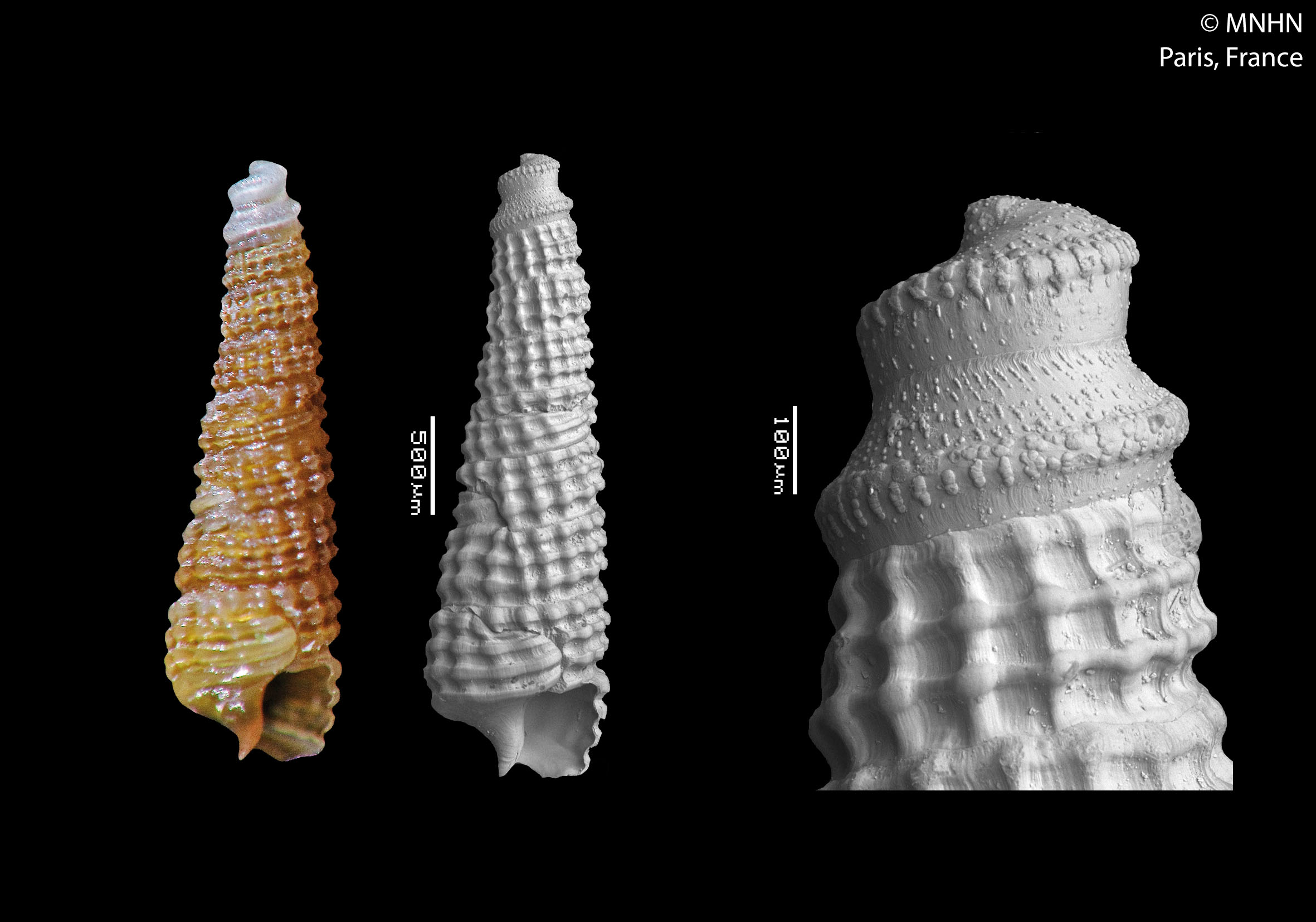
- Shell of Oparopsis floresi (paratype at MNHN, Paris)

Scientific classification
- Kingdom: Animalia
- Phylum: Mollusca
- Class: Gastropoda
- Subclass: Caenogastropoda
- Order: incertae sedis
- Family: Cerithiopsidae
- Genus: Oparopsis; Cecalupo & Perugia, 2015

Type species
- Australopsis floresi Cecalupo & Perugia, 2014

Synonyms
- Australopsis Cecalupo & Perugia, 2014 (invalid: junior homonym of Australopsis Hinz-Schallreuter, 1993 [Ostracoda]; Oparopsis is a replacement name)

= Oparopsis =

Genus of gastropods

Oparopsis is a genus of very small sea snails, marine gastropod molluscs in the family Cerithiopsidae.

== Species ==
- Oparopsis floresi (Cecalupo & Perugia, 2014)
- Oparopsis hikimarum Cecalupo & Perugia, 2019
- Oparopsis nofronii (Amati, 1987)
- Oparopsis tsuzukii Cecalupo & Perugia, 2019
