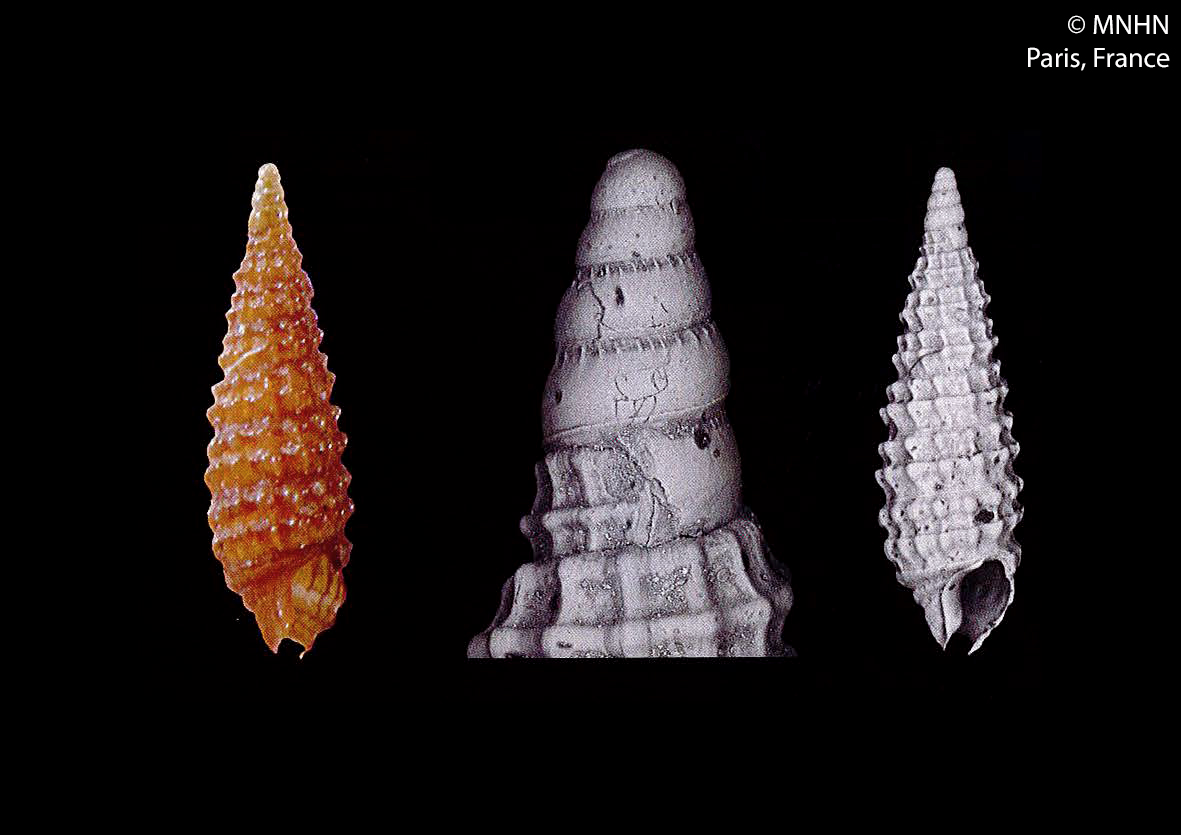
- Shell of Dizoniopsis zannii (holotype at MNHN, Paris)

Scientific classification
- Kingdom: Animalia
- Phylum: Mollusca
- Class: Gastropoda
- Subclass: Caenogastropoda
- Order: incertae sedis
- Family: Cerithiopsidae
- Genus: Dizoniopsis; Sacco, 1895

Type species
- † Cerithium bilineatum Hoernes, 1848

Synonyms
- Cerithiopsis (Dizoniopsis) Sacco, 1895 (original rank)

= Dizoniopsis =

Genus of gastropods

Dizoniopsis is a genus of minute sea snails, marine gastropod molluscs in the family Cerithiopsidae.

This genus was described by Sacco in 1895.

== Species ==
Species in the genus Dizoniopsis include:

- Dizoniopsis abylensis Bouchet, Gofas & Warén, 2010
- Dizoniopsis apexclarus Rolán, 2007
- † Dizoniopsis aquitaniensis (Cossmann & Peyrot, 1922)
- Dizoniopsis aspicienda Bouchet, Gofas & Warén, 2010
- † Dizoniopsis bilineata (Hoernes, 1848)
- † Dizoniopsis bilineatoides Gougerot & Le Renard, 1981
- † Dizoniopsis boucheti Landau, Ceulemans & Van Dingenen, 2018
- † Dizoniopsis brevicaput Lozouet, Lesport & Renard, 2001
- Dizoniopsis concatenata (Conti, 1864)
- Dizoniopsis coppolae (Aradas, 1870)
- Dizoniopsis gothica Jay & Drivas, 2002
- Dizoniopsis herberti Jay & Drivas, 2002
- Dizoniopsis herosae Jay & Drivas, 2002
- Dizoniopsis zannii Cecalupo & Perugia, 2018

Species brought into synonymy

- Dizoniopsis micalii Cecalupo & Villari, 1997: synonym of Cerithiopsis micalii (Cecalupo & Villari, 1997)
- Dizoniopsis pulchella (Jeffreys, 1858): synonym of Cerithiopsis jeffreysi R. B. Watson, 1885
