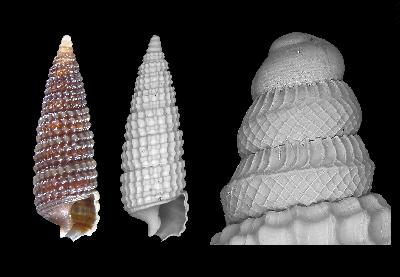
- Shell of Cerithiopsidella caterinae (holotype in MNHN, Paris)

Scientific classification
- Kingdom: Animalia
- Phylum: Mollusca
- Class: Gastropoda
- Subclass: Caenogastropoda
- Order: incertae sedis
- Family: Cerithiopsidae
- Genus: Cerithiopsidella; Bartsch, 1911

Type species
- Cerithiopsis cosmia Bartsch, 1907

Synonyms
- Cerithiopsis (Cerithiopsidella) Bartsch, 1911 (original rank)

= Cerithiopsidella =

Genus of gastropods

Cerithiopsidella is a genus of very small sea snails, marine gastropod molluscs in the family Cerithiopsidae. It was described by Paul Bartsch in 1911.

== Species ==
- Cerithiopsidella alcima (Bartsch, 1911)
- Cerithiopsidella antefilosa (Bartsch, 1911)
- Cerithiopsidella blacki Marshall, 1978
- Cerithiopsidella caterinae Cecalupo & Perugia, 2014
- Cerithiopsidella chiarellii Cecalupo & Perugia, 2018
- Cerithiopsidella cornea Cecalupo & Perugia, 2017
- Cerithiopsidella cosmia (Bartsch, 1907)
- † Cerithiopsidella propria (Laws, 1941)
- † Cerithiopsidella pustulosa Lozouet, 1999
- Cerithiopsidella ziliolii Cecalupo & Perugia, 2012
