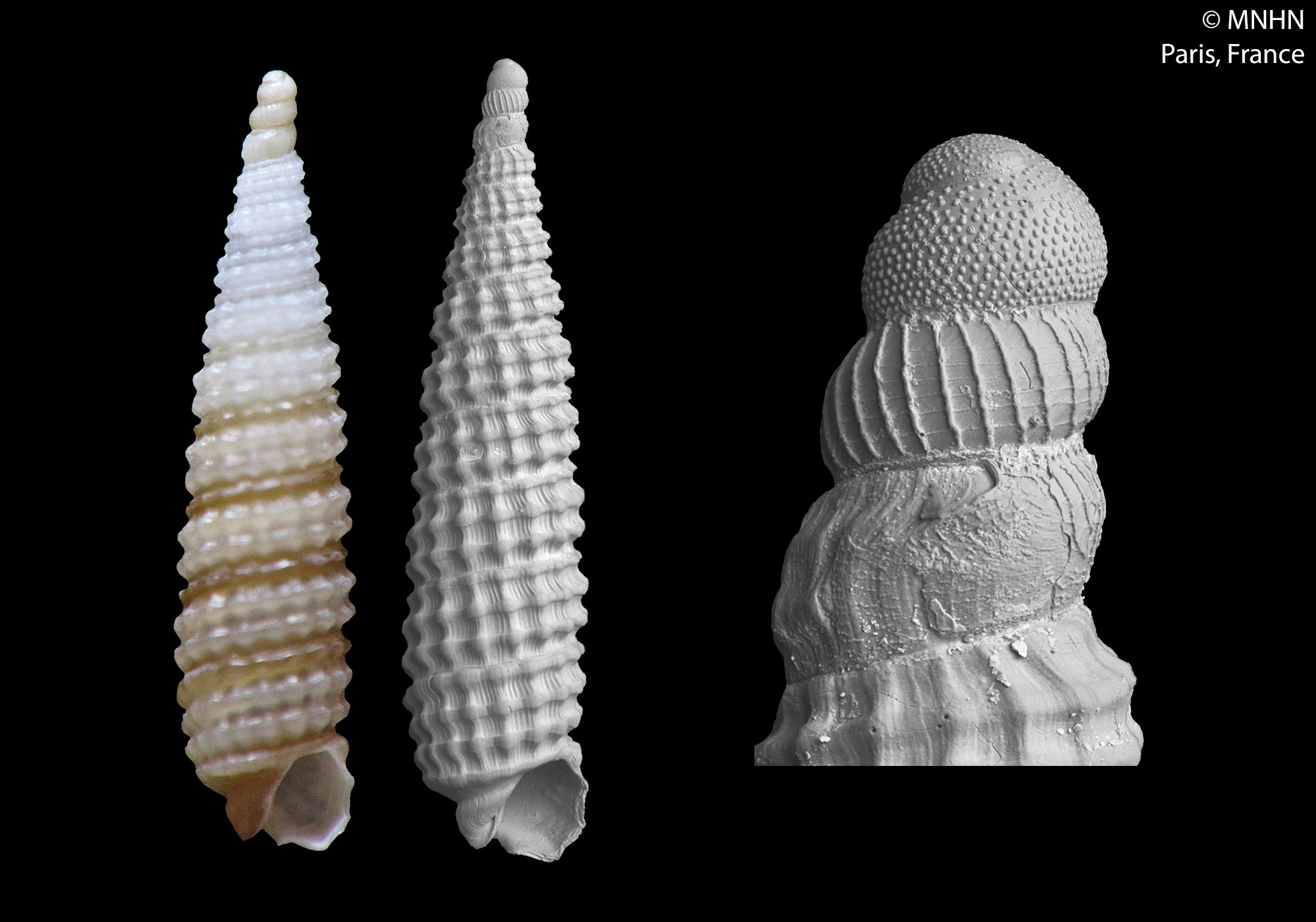
- A shell of Prolixodens whaaporum

Scientific classification
- Kingdom: Animalia
- Phylum: Mollusca
- Class: Gastropoda
- Subclass: Caenogastropoda
- Order: incertae sedis
- Superfamily: Triphoroidea
- Family: Cerithiopsidae; H. Adams & A. Adams, 1854

Synonyms
- Aliptinae B. A. Marshall, 1978 (alternate representation); Cerithiopsinae H. Adams & A. Adams, 1853 (alternate representation); Seilinae Golikov & Starobogatov, 1975 (alternate representation)

= Cerithiopsidae =

Family of gastropods

Cerithiopsidae is a family of very small sea snails in the informal group Ptenoglossa. Members of this family are known as cerithiopsids.

These tiny snails have shells that are very high-spired and consist of multiple whorls.

== Subfamilies ==
The following subfamilies were recognized in the taxonomy of Bouchet & Rocroi (2005):

- Aliptinae Marshall, 1978
- Cerithiopsinae H. Adams & A. Adams, 1853
- Seilinae Golikov & Starobogatov, 1975

== Genera ==
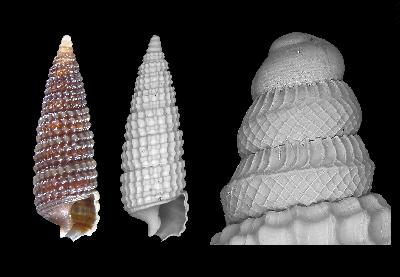
Cerithiopsidella caterinae

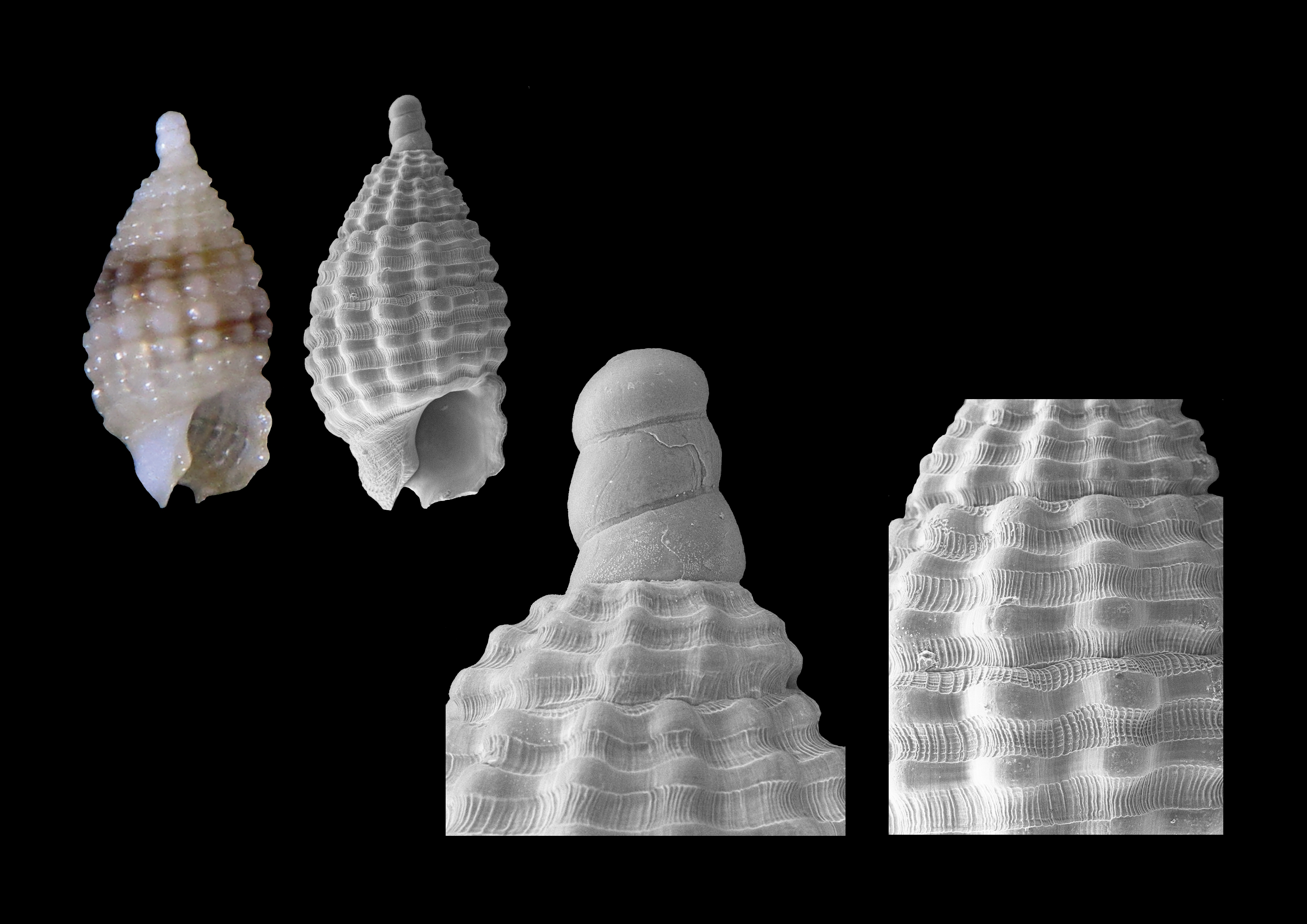
Holotype of Joculator boguszae

As of August 2020, the following genera are included in the family Cerithiopsidae:

- Alipta Finlay, 1927
- Aliptina Marshall, 1978
- Belonimorphis Jay & Drivas, 2002
- Cerithiopsidella Bartsch, 1911
- Cerithiopsilla Thiele, 1912
- Cerithiopsina Bartsch, 1911
- Cerithiopsis Forbes & Hanley, 1850
- Clathropsis Laseron, 1956
- † Cosmocerithium Cossmann, 1906
- Costulopsis Cecalupo & Robba, 2019
- Cubalaskeya Rolan & Fernandez-Garcés, 2008
- † Cyrbasia Harris & Burrows, 1891
- Dizoniopsis Sacco, 1895
- † Dragonia Guzhov, 2019
- Ektonos Bouchet & Warén, 1993
- † Eocolina Chavan, 1952
- Granulopsis Cecalupo & Perugia, 2012
- Horologica Laseron, 1956
- Joculator Hedley, 1909
- Koilofera Jay & Drivas, 2002
- Krachia Baluk, 1975
- Krachiopsis Smriglio & Mariottini, 1999
- Marshallopsis Cecalupo & Perugia, 2012
- Mendax Finlay, 1926
- Onchodia Dall, 1924
- Ondulopsis Cecalupo & Perugia, 2012
- Oparopsis Cecalupo & Perugia, 2015
- Paraseila Laseron, 1951
- Pilaflexis Laseron, 1951
- Potenatomus Laseron, 1956
- Prolixodens Marshall, 1978
- Proseila Thiele, 1929
- Seila A. Adams, 1861
- Seilopsis Tomlin, 1931
- Socienna Finlay, 1927
- Specula Finlay, 1927
- Speculator Warén & Bouchet, 2001
- Sundaya Oliver, 1915
- Spinoseila P. A. Maxwell, 1992
- Synthopsis Laseron, 1956
- Tasmalira Dell, 1956
- † Thereitis Le Renard, 1998
- Tubercliopsis Laseron, 1956
- Zaclys Finlay, 1927

Genera brought into synonymy

- Australopsis Cecalupo & Perugia, 2014: synonym of Oparopsis Cecalupo & Perugia, 2015 (invalid: junior homonym of Australopsis Hinz-Schallreuter, 1993 [Ostracoda]; Oparopsis is a replacement name)
- Callisteuma Tomlin, 1929: synonym of Granulopsis Cecalupo & Perugia, 2012 (invalid: junior homonym of Callisteuma Prout, 1912 [Lepidoptera]; Granulopsis is a replacement name)
- Cinctella Monterosato, 1884: synonym of Seila A. Adams, 1861
- Conciliopsis Laseron, 1956: synonym of Cerithiopsis Forbes & Hanley, 1850
- Granulotriforis Kosuge, 1967: synonym of Trituba (Granulotriforis) Kosuge, 1967 represented as Trituba Jousseaume, 1884
- Hebeseila Finlay, 1926: synonym of Seila (Hebeseila) Finlay, 1926 represented as Seila A. Adams, 1861
- Lyroseila Finlay, 1928: synonym of Seila (Lyroseila) Finlay, 1928 represented as Seila A. Adams, 1861
- Nanopsis Cecalupo & Robba, 2010: synonym of Costulopsis Cecalupo & Robba, 2019 (invalid: junior homonym of Nanopsis Henningsmoen, 1954 [Ostracoda]; Costulopsis is a replacement name)
- Notoseila Finlay, 1926: synonym of Seila (Notoseila) Finlay, 1926 represented as Seila A. Adams, 1861
- † Tembrockia Gründel, 1980 : synonym of † Thereitis Le Renard, 1998 (preoccupied by Tembrockia Glibert & van de Poel, 1967 (Bivalvia); Thereitis Le Renard, 1998 is a replacement name)
