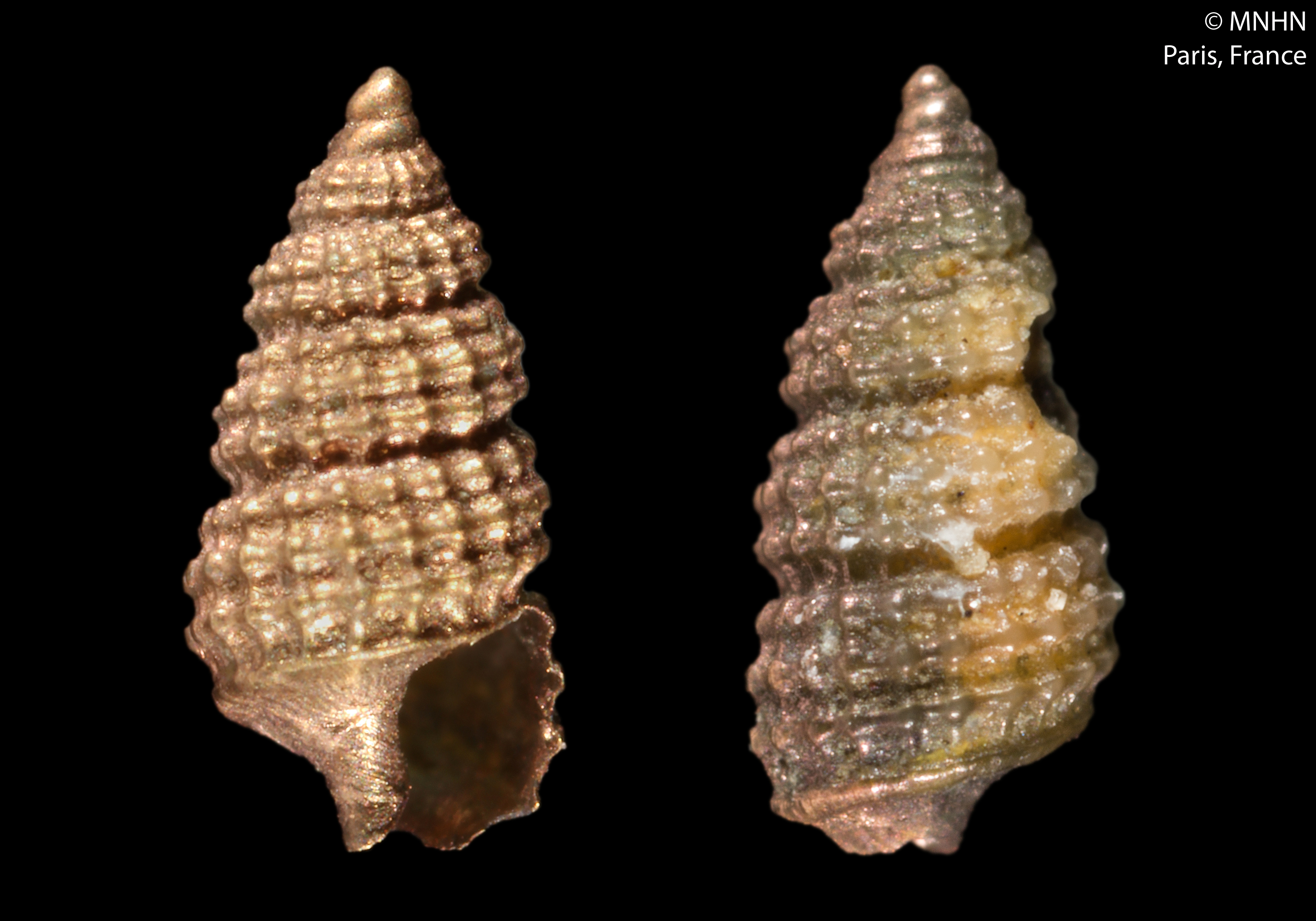
- Shell of Cerithiopsis paucispiralis

Scientific classification
- Domain: Eukaryota
- Kingdom: Animalia
- Phylum: Mollusca
- Class: Gastropoda
- Subclass: Caenogastropoda
- Clade: Hypsogastropoda
- Family: Cerithiopsidae
- Genus: Cerithiopsis; Forbes & Hanley, 1851

Type species
- Murex tubercularis Montagu, 1803

Synonyms
- Conciliopsis Laseron, 1956; Nanopsis Cecalupo & Robba, 2010 (Preoccupied by Nanopsis Freytag, 1974, a genus or subgenus of leafhoppers)

= Cerithiopsis =

Genus of sea snails

Cerithiopsis is a genus of very small sea snails, marine gastropod mollusks or micromollusks in the family Cerithiopsidae.

== Distribution ==
This genus occurs in the Caribbean Sea including Cuba, in the Atlantic Ocean including the Cape Verde islands and Angola and in the Indian Ocean including the Aldabra Atoll.

== Species ==
Species within the genus Cerithiopsis include:

- Cerithiopsis abjecta Preston, 1905
- Cerithiopsis abreojosensis Bartsch, 1911
- Cerithiopsis academicorum Rolán & Espinosa, 1996
- Cerithiopsis acontium Dall, 1889
- Cerithiopsis aequatorialis Thiele, 1925
- † Cerithiopsis aequicincta Suter, 1917
- Cerithiopsis agulhasensis Thiele, 1925
- Cerithiopsis aimen Rolán & Espinosa, 1996
- Cerithiopsis alabastrula (Mörch, 1876)
- Cerithiopsis albovittata (C. B. Adams, 1850)
- Cerithiopsis alfredensis Bartsch, 1915
- Cerithiopsis althea Dall, 1927
- Cerithiopsis altiusae Cecalupo & Perugia, 2020
- Cerithiopsis amabilis (Bayle, 1880)
- Cerithiopsis anaitis Bartsch, 1918
- † Cerithiopsis andreae Schnetler & M. S. Nielsen, 2018
- Cerithiopsis annae Cecalupo & Buzzurro, 2005
- Cerithiopsis antemunda Bartsch, 1911
- Cerithiopsis apexcostata Rolán, Espinosa, Fernández-Garcés, 2007
- Cerithiopsis apicicosta May, 1920
- Cerithiopsis apicina Dall, 1927
- Cerithiopsis aquilum Rehder, 1980
- Cerithiopsis ara Dall & Bartsch, 1911
- Cerithiopsis aralia Olsson & Harbison, 1953
- Cerithiopsis arga Kay, 1979
- Cerithiopsis argentea Dall, 1927
- Cerithiopsis arnoldi Bartsch, 1911
- Cerithiopsis atalaya Watson, 1885
- Cerithiopsis aurea Bartsch, 1911
- Cerithiopsis baculiformis Thiele, 1925
- Cerithiopsis baculum A. Adams, 1861
- Cerithiopsis bakeri Bartsch, 1917
- Cerithiopsis bakisi Cecalupo & Perugia, 2020
- Cerithiopsis balaustium Figueira & Pimenta, 2008
- Cerithiopsis barleei Jeffreys, 1867
- Cerithiopsis barthelati Cecalupo & Perugia, 2020
- Cerithiopsis beneitoi Rolán, Espinosa & Fernández-Garcés, 2007
- Cerithiopsis berryi Bartsch, 1911
- Cerithiopsis bicolor Bartsch, 1911
- Cerithiopsis bilineata (Hoernes, 1848)
- Cerithiopsis blandi Deshayes in Vignal, 1900
- † Cerithiopsis boanderseni Schnetler & M. S. Nielsen, 2018
- Cerithiopsis boucheti Jay & Drivas, 2002
- Cerithiopsis bouchonorum Cecalupo & Perugia, 2020
- Cerithiopsis boutrini Cecalupo & Perugia, 2020
- Cerithiopsis bristolae Baker, Hanna & Strong, 1938
- Cerithiopsis brivalae Cecalupo & Perugia, 2020
- Cerithiopsis brugneauxae Cecalupo & Perugia, 2020
- Cerithiopsis brunnea Thiele, 1930
- Cerithiopsis brunneoflavida Preston, 1905
- † Cerithiopsis burkevillensis Dall, 1913
- Cerithiopsis buzzurroi (Cecalupo & Robba, 2010)
- Cerithiopsis cabritensis Cecalupo & Perugia, 2020
- Cerithiopsis caelata (Gould, 1849)
- Cerithiopsis capixaba Figueira & Pimenta, 2008
- Cerithiopsis caribbaea (Gabb, 1881)
- Cerithiopsis carlottae Cecalupo & Perugia, 2018
- Cerithiopsis carpenteri Bartsch, 1911
- Cerithiopsis carrota (Laseron, 1956)
- Cerithiopsis ceac Rolán & Fernández-Garcés, 2010
- Cerithiopsis cerea Carpenter, 1857
- † Cerithiopsis cerithiopsoides Landau, Ceulemans & Van Dingenen, 2018
- Cerithiopsis cesta Bartsch, 1911
- Cerithiopsis chambardi Cecalupo & Perugia, 2020
- Cerithiopsis charlottensis Bartsch, 1917
- Cerithiopsis cinereoflava (Mörch, 1876)
- Cerithiopsis columna Carpenter, 1864
- Cerithiopsis cruzana Usticke, 1959
- Cerithiopsis curtata Bartsch, 1911
- Cerithiopsis dannyi Cecalupo & Perugia, 2020
- Cerithiopsis decora Dall, 1927
- Cerithiopsis demaziereae Cecalupo & Perugia, 2020
- Cerithiopsis desjobertae Cecalupo & Perugia, 2020
- Cerithiopsis denticulata (Cecalupo & Robba, 2010)
- Cerithiopsis destrugesi (de Folin, 1867)
- Cerithiopsis diadema Monterosato, 1874
- Cerithiopsis dilata Rolán, Espinosa, Fernández-Garcés, 2007
- Cerithiopsis diomedeae Bartsch, 1911
- Cerithiopsis docata Dall, 1927
- Cerithiopsis dominguezi Rolán & Espinosa, 1996
- Cerithiopsis domlamyi Cecalupo & Perugia, 2020
- Cerithiopsis dubreuili Cecalupo & Perugia, 2020
- Cerithiopsis eiseni Strong & Hertlein, 1939
- Cerithiopsis electrina Hedley, 1899
- Cerithiopsis elima Dall, 1927
- Cerithiopsis eliza Dall, 1927
- Cerithiopsis elsa Dall, 1927
- † Cerithiopsis emilieae Schnetler & M. S. Nielsen, 2018
- † Cerithiopsis eopachus Lozouet, Lesport & Renard, 2001
- Cerithiopsis erna Bartsch, 1915
- † Cerithiopsis esterae Landau, Ceulemans & Van Dingenen, 2018
- Cerithiopsis etiennei Cecalupo & Perugia, 2020
- Cerithiopsis eutrapela Melvill & Standen, 1896
- Cerithiopsis euxinica Milaschewitsch, 1916
- Cerithiopsis exquisita G.B. Sowerby III, 1897
- Cerithiopsis familiarum Rolán, Espinosa & Fernández-Garcés, 2007
- Cerithiopsis fasciata Golikov & Gulbin, 1978
- Cerithiopsis fayalensis Watson, 1880
- Cerithiopsis flava (C. B. Adams, 1850)
- Cerithiopsis flavida Golikov & Gulbin, 1978
- Cerithiopsis floridana Dall, 1892
- Cerithiopsis fosterae Melvill & Standen, 1896
- Cerithiopsis foveolata (Sowerby III, 1892)
- Cerithiopsis fraseri Bartsch, 1921
- Cerithiopsis fuscoflava Rolán & Espinosa, 1996
- Cerithiopsis fusiformis (C. B. Adams, 1850)
- Cerithiopsis galapagensis Bartsch, 1911
- Cerithiopsis gemmulosa (C. B. Adams, 1850)
- Cerithiopsis georgiana Dall, 1927
- Cerithiopsis gissleri Strong & Hertlein, 1939
- Cerithiopsis giuliafassioae Cecalupo & Perugia, 2020
- Cerithiopsis gloriosa Bartsch, 1911
- Cerithiopsis gordaensis Rolán & Fernández-Garcés, 2010
- Cerithiopsis greenii (C.B. Adams, 1839)
- Cerithiopsis greppii Buzzurro & Cecalupo, 2005
- Cerithiopsis grippi Bartsch, 1917
- Cerithiopsis guanacastensis Hertlein & Strong, 1951
- Cerithiopsis guatulcoensis Hertlein & Strong, 1951
- Cerithiopsis guitarti Espinosa & Ortea, 2001
- Cerithiopsis halia Bartsch, 1911
- Cerithiopsis hielardae Cecalupo & Perugia, 2020
- Cerithiopsis hedista Melvill & Standen, 1896
- Cerithiopsis hero Bartsch, 1911
- Cerithiopsis honora Dall, 1927
- Cerithiopsis inespazosae Rolán & Gori, 2013
- Cerithiopsis inespazosae Rolán & Gori, 2013
- Cerithiopsis infrequens (C.B. Adams, 1852)
- Cerithiopsis ingens (Bartsch, 1907)
- † Cerithiopsis inopinus Hoerle, 1972
- Cerithiopsis insignis E.A. Smith, 1906
- Cerithiopsis io Dall & Bartsch, 1911
- Cerithiopsis iochrous Jay & Drivas, 2002
- Cerithiopsis iontha Bartsch, 1911
- Cerithiopsis iota (C. B. Adams, 1845)
- Cerithiopsis iudithae Reitano & Buzzurro, 2006
- Cerithiopsis iuxtafuniculata Rolán, Espinosa & Fernández-Garcés, 2007
- Cerithiopsis janira Bartsch in Golikov & Scarlato, 1967
- Cerithiopsis jeffreysi Watson, 1885
- Cerithiopsis jousseaumei Jay & Drivas, 2002
- Cerithiopsis kinoi Baker, Hanna & Strong, 1938
- Cerithiopsis krisbergi Rolán & Fernández-Garcés, 2007
- Cerithiopsis ladae Prkic & Buzzurro, 2007
- Cerithiopsis lamyi Jay & Drivas, 2002
- Cerithiopsis lata (C. B. Adams, 1850)
- Cerithiopsis leipha Dall, 1927
- Cerithiopsis leopardus Rolán & Gori, 2013
- † Cerithiopsis luiseae Schnetler & M. S. Nielsen, 2018
- Cerithiopsis magellanica Bartsch, 1911
- Cerithiopsis matara Dall, 1889
- Cerithiopsis mathildaeformis Melvill, 1906
- Cerithiopsis melvilli Jay & Drivas, 2002
- Cerithiopsis merida Dall, 1927
- Cerithiopsis micalii (Cecalupo & Villari, 1997)
- Cerithiopsis michellegalli Cecalupo & Perugia, 2020
- Cerithiopsis michezae Cecalupo & Perugia, 2020
- Cerithiopsis minima (Brusina, 1865)
- Cerithiopsis minutissima Thiele, 1925
- † Cerithiopsis mira Landau, Ceulemans & Van Dingenen, 2018
- Cerithiopsis montereyensis Bartsch, 1911
- Cerithiopsis montezumai Strong & Hertlein, 1939
- Cerithiopsis morelosensis Rolán & Fernández-Garcés, 2010
- Cerithiopsis movilla Dall & Bartsch, 1911
- † Cerithiopsis mucro (Laws, 1939) †
- Cerithiopsis natachae Cecalupo & Perugia, 2020
- Cerithiopsis nana Jeffreys, 1867
- Cerithiopsis neglecta (C.B. Adams, 1852)
- Cerithiopsis niasensis Thiele, 1925
- Cerithiopsis nina Bartsch, 1915
- Cerithiopsis nofronii Amati, 1987
- Cerithiopsis nutzeli Jay & Drivas, 2002
- Cerithiopsis oaxacana Hertlein & Strong, 1951
- Cerithiopsis oculisfictis Prkic & Mariottini, 2010
- Cerithiopsis oliviergrosi Cecalupo & Perugia, 2020
- Cerithiopsis onealensis Bartsch, 1921
- Cerithiopsis orientalis Preston, 1905
- Cerithiopsis oxys Bartsch, 1911
- Cerithiopsis pallida Golikov, 1988
- Cerithiopsis pandangensis Thiele, 1925
- Cerithiopsis paramoea Bartsch, 1911
- Cerithiopsis parvada Rolán, Espinosa & Fernández-Garcés, 2007
- Cerithiopsis paucispiralis Rolán & Fernandes, 1989
- Cerithiopsis pedroana Bartsch, 1907
- Cerithiopsis pennecae Cecalupo & Perugia, 2020
- Cerithiopsis perigaudae Cecalupo & Perugia, 2020
- Cerithiopsis perlata (Monterosato, 1889)
- Cerithiopsis perrini Hertlein & Strong, 1951
- Cerithiopsis pesa Dall & Bartsch, 1911
- Cerithiopsis petala Dall, 1927
- Cerithiopsis petanii Prkic & Mariottini, 2010
- Cerithiopsis piaseckii Cecalupo & Perugia, 2020
- Cerithiopsis pickeringae Jay & Drivas, 2002
- Cerithiopsis porteri Baker, Hanna & Strong, 1938
- Cerithiopsis portoi Rolán & Espinosa, 1996
- † Cerithiopsis postuloclathrata Darragh, 2017
- Cerithiopsis powelli Marshall, 1978
- Cerithiopsis prieguei Rolán & Espinosa, 1996
- Cerithiopsis pseudomovilla Rolán & Espinosa, 1996
- Cerithiopsis pulcherrima Melvill, 1896
- Cerithiopsis pulchresculpta Cachia, Mifsud & Sammut, 2004
- Cerithiopsis pulvis (Issel, 1869)
- Cerithiopsis pupiformis Carpenter, 1857
- Cerithiopsis rabilleri Cecalupo & Perugia, 2020
- Cerithiopsis recourti Cecalupo & Perugia, 2020
- Cerithiopsis redferni Cecalupo & Perugia, 2020
- Cerithiopsis rostaingi Cecalupo & Perugia, 2020
- Cerithiopsis rubricincta Melvill, 1896
- † Cerithiopsis saepta (Marwick, 1931)
- Cerithiopsis satisnodosa Rolán & Fernández-Garcés, 2010
- Cerithiopsis scalaris (Locard, 1892)
- Cerithiopsis seddonae Jay & Drivas, 2002
- Cerithiopsis serina Dall, 1927
- Cerithiopsis shepstonensis Tomlin, 1923
- † Cerithiopsis simulator (Laws, 1939)
- Cerithiopsis singularis Rolán & Fernández-Garcés, 2013
- Cerithiopsis sorex Carpenter, 1857
- Cerithiopsis soror Thiele, 1925
- Cerithiopsis spongicola Habe, 1960
- Cerithiopsis stejnegeri Dall, 1884
- Cerithiopsis stephensae Bartsch, 1909
- Cerithiopsis stylifera Thiele, 1930
- Cerithiopsis subgloriosa Baker, Hanna & Strong, 1938
- Cerithiopsis subreticulata (Dunker, 1860)
- Cerithiopsis sumatrensis Thiele, 1925
- Cerithiopsis susieae Rolán & Krisberg, 2014
- Cerithiopsis sykesii Melvill, 1896
- Cerithiopsis tarruellasi Peñas & Rolán, 2006
- † Cerithiopsis temperans (Marwick, 1931)
- Cerithiopsis tenthrenois (Melvill, 1896)
- Cerithiopsis tubercularis (Montagu, 1803)
- Cerithiopsis tuberculoides Carpenter, 1857
- Cerithiopsis tumida (Bartsch, 1907)
- Cerithiopsis vanhyningi Bartsch, 1918
- Cerithiopsis vicola Dall & Bartsch, 1911
- † Cerithiopsis vignali Cossmann & Perot, 1922
- Cerithiopsis vinca Olsson & Harbison, 1953
- Cerithiopsis virginica Henderson & Bartsch, 1914
- Cerithiopsis warmkae Jong & Coomans, 1988
- Cerithiopsis wayae Jay & Drivas, 2002
- Cerithiopsis willetti Bartsch, 1921

Species brought into synonymy

- Subgenus Cerithiopsis (Joculator) Hedley, 1909: synonym of Joculator Hedley, 1909
- Subgenus Cerithiopsis (Metaxia) Monterosato, 1884: synonym of Metaxia Monterosato, 1884
- Subgenus Cerithiopsis (Seila) A. Adams, 1861: synonym of Seila A. Adams, 1861
- Cerithiopsis acies Suter, 1908: synonym of Zaclys sarissa (Murdoch, 1905)
- Cerithiopsis adamsi Bartsch, 1911: synonym of Cerithiopsina adamsi (Bartsch, 1911)
- Cerithiopsis amblytera Watson, 1880: synonym of Cerithiella amblytera (Watson, 1880)
- Cerithiopsis balteata Watson, 1881: synonym of Horologica balteata (Watson, 1881)
- Cerithiopsis barleii: synonym of Cerithiopsis barleei Jeffreys, 1867
- Cerithiopsis bermudensis Verrill & Bush, 1900: synonym of Metaxia rugulosa (C. B. Adams, 1850)
- Cerithiopsis bicolor (C. B. Adams, 1845): synonym of Retilaskeya bicolor (C. B. Adams, 1845)
- Cerithiopsis bizonalis Jeffreys, 1885: synonym of Cerithiella metula (Lovén, 1846)
- Cerithiopsis buijsei Jong & Coomans, 1988: synonym of Cerithiopsis lata (C. B. Adams, 1850)
- Cerithiopsis canaliculata Suter, 1908: synonym of Specula retifera (Suter, 1908)
- Cerithiopsis concinna Sykes, 1925: synonym of Narrimania concinna (Sykes, 1925)
- Cerithiopsis cosmia Bartsch, 1907: synonym of Cerithiopsidella cosmia (Bartsch, 1907)
- Cerithiopsis costulatus (Møller, 1842): synonym of Eumetula arctica (Mørch, 1857)
- Cerithiopsis crenistria Suter, 1907: synonym of Alipta crenistria (Suter, 1907)
- Cerithiopsis crystallina Dall, 1881: synonym of Varicopeza crystallina (Dall, 1881)
- Cerithiopsis cynthia Bartsch, 1911: synonym of Cerithiopsis iota (C. B. Adams, 1845)
- Cerithiopsis diegensis Bartsch, 1911: synonym of Cerithiopsida diegensis (Bartsch, 1911)
- Cerithiopsis emersonii (C.B. Adams, 1839): synonym of Retilaskeya emersonii (C.B. Adams, 1839)
- Cerithiopsis excelsum Yokoyama, 1928: synonym of Orectospira shikoensis (Yokoyama, 1928)
- Cerithiopsis geniculosus Hedley, 1911: synonym of Altispecula geniculosa (Hedley, 1911)
- Cerithiopsis hadfieldi Jay & Drivas, 2002: synonym of Synthopsis hadfieldi (Jay & Drivas, 2002)
- Cerithiopsis infracolor Laseron, 1951: synonym of Prolixodens infracolor (Laseron, 1951)
- Cerithiopsis marginata Suter, 1908: synonym of Mendax marginata (Suter, 1908)
- Cerithiopsis metaxae (delle Chiaje, 1828): synonym of Metaxia metaxa (delle Chiaje, 1828)
- Cerithiopsis nana Mayer, 1864: synonym of Bittium nanum (Mayer, 1864)
- Cerithiopsis oculisfictis Prkic & Mariottini, 2010: synonym of Cerithiopsis tubercularis (Montagu, 1803)
- Cerithiopsis peilei E.A. Smith, 1910: synonym of Seilopsis peilei (E.A. Smith, 1910)
- Cerithiopsis pulchella Jeffreys, 1858: synonym of Cerithiopsis jeffreysi Watson, 1885
- Cerithiopsis ridicula Watson, 1886: synonym of Joculator ridiculus (Watson, 1886)
- Cerithiopsis sarissa Murdoch, 1905: synonym of Zaclys sarissa (Murdoch, 1905)
- Cerithiopsis semipicta Gould, 1861: synonym of Joculator semipictus (Gould, 1861)
- Cerithiopsis shikoensis Yokoyama, 1928: synonym of Orectospira shikoensis (Yokoyama, 1928)
- Cerithiopsis signa Bartsch, 1921: synonym of Cerithiopsina signa (Bartsch, 1921)
- Cerithiopsis sigsbeana Dall, 1881: synonym of Cerithiella sigsbeana (Dall, 1881)
- Cerithiopsis sinon (Bayle, 1880): synonym of Royella sinon (Bayle, 1880)
- Cerithiopsis styliformis Suter, 1908: synonym of Specula styliformis (Suter, 1908)
- Cerithiopsis subantarctica Suter, 1908: synonym of Zaclys sarissa (Murdoch, 1905)
- Cerithiopsis tribulationis Hedley, 1909: synonym of Joculator tribulationis (Hedley, 1909)
- Cerithiopsis trizonalis Odhner, 1924: synonym of Mendax trizonalis (Odhner, 1924)
- Cerithiopsis turbonilloides Dautzenberg & H. Fischer, 1896: synonym of Ektonos turbonilloides (Dautzenberg & Fischer H., 1896)
- Cerithiopsis turrigera Watson, 1886: synonym of Joculator turriger (Watson, 1886)
- Cerithiopsis valeriae Giusti Fr., 1987: synonym of Onchodia valeriae (Giusti Fr., 1987)
- Cerithiopsis westiana Hedley, 1909: synonym of Horologica westiana (Hedley, 1909)
