= Melvilli =

Melvilli may refer to:

- Abyssochrysos melvilli, species of sea snail
- Carenzia melvilli, species of sea snail
- Cerithiopsis melvilli, species of sea snail
- Comitas melvilli, species of sea snail
- Conus melvilli, species of sea snail
- Marginella melvilli, species of sea snail
- Medusafissurella melvilli, species of sea snail
- Micropleurotoma melvilli, species of sea snail
- Paradrillia melvilli, species of sea snail
- Parmaphorella melvilli, species of sea snail
- Turbonilla melvilli, species of sea snail
- Turrilatirus melvilli, species of sea snail
