= Cerithiopsis acontium =

Scientific classification
- Domain: Eukaryota
- Kingdom: Animalia
- Phylum: Mollusca
- Class: Gastropoda
- Subclass: Caenogastropoda
- Clade: Hypsogastropoda
- Family: Cerithiopsidae
- Genus: Cerithiopsis
- Species: C. acontium

Binomial name
- Cerithiopsis acontium W. H. Dall, 1889

Species of gastropod

Cerithiopsis acontium is a species of very small sea snail, a marine gastropod mollusk in the family Cerithiopsidae. This species was described by the American malacologist William Healey Dall in 1889.

== Description ==
The maximum recorded shell length is 8 mm.

== Habitat ==
Minimum recorded depth is 183 m. Maximum recorded depth is 183 m.
