= Cerithiopsis caribbaea =

Scientific classification
- Domain: Eukaryota
- Kingdom: Animalia
- Phylum: Mollusca
- Class: Gastropoda
- Subclass: Caenogastropoda
- Clade: Hypsogastropoda
- Family: Cerithiopsidae
- Genus: Cerithiopsis
- Species: C. caribbaea

Binomial name
- Cerithiopsis caribbaea (Gabb, 1881)

Species of gastropod

Cerithiopsis caribbaea is a species of sea snail, a gastropod in the family Cerithiopsidae. It was described by Gabb in 1881.
