= Cerithiopsis pulchresculpta =

Scientific classification
- Domain: Eukaryota
- Kingdom: Animalia
- Phylum: Mollusca
- Class: Gastropoda
- Subclass: Caenogastropoda
- Clade: Hypsogastropoda
- Family: Cerithiopsidae
- Genus: Cerithiopsis
- Species: C. pulchresculpta

Binomial name
- Cerithiopsis pulchresculpta Cachia, Mifsud & Sammut, 2004

Species of gastropod

Cerithiopsis pulchresculpta is a species of sea snail, a gastropod in the family Cerithiopsidae. It was described by Cachia, Mifsud, and Sammut, 2004.
