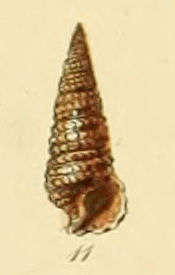

Scientific classification
- Domain: Eukaryota
- Kingdom: Animalia
- Phylum: Mollusca
- Class: Gastropoda
- Subclass: Caenogastropoda
- Clade: Hypsogastropoda
- Family: Cerithiopsidae
- Genus: Cerithiopsis
- Species: C. tubercularis

Binomial name
- Cerithiopsis tubercularis (Montagu, 1803)

Synonyms
- Cerithiopsis oculisfictis Prkic & Mariottini, 2010; Cerithium pygmaeum Philippi, 1844; Cerithiopsis aciculata Locard & Caziot, 1900; Murex tubercularis Montagu, 1803

= Cerithiopsis tubercularis =

Species of gastropod

Cerithiopsis tubercularis is a species of sea snail, a gastropod in the family Cerithiopsidae, It was described by Montagu, in 1803.

== Distribution ==
This species is known from the northeastern Atlantic Ocean, the Azores, Cape Verde and European waters, including the Mediterranean Sea.
