= Cerithiopsis iudithae =

Scientific classification
- Domain: Eukaryota
- Kingdom: Animalia
- Phylum: Mollusca
- Class: Gastropoda
- Subclass: Caenogastropoda
- Clade: Hypsogastropoda
- Family: Cerithiopsidae
- Genus: Cerithiopsis
- Species: C. iudithae

Binomial name
- Cerithiopsis iudithae Reitano & Buzzurro, 2006

Species of gastropod

Cerithiopsis iudithae is a species of sea snail, a gastropod in the family Cerithiopsidae. It was described by Reitano and Buzzurro in 2006.
