= Cerithiopsis ladae =

Scientific classification
- Domain: Eukaryota
- Kingdom: Animalia
- Phylum: Mollusca
- Class: Gastropoda
- Subclass: Caenogastropoda
- Clade: Hypsogastropoda
- Family: Cerithiopsidae
- Genus: Cerithiopsis
- Species: C. ladae

Binomial name
- Cerithiopsis ladae Prkic & Buzzurro, 2007

Species of gastropod

Cerithiopsis ladae is a species of sea snail, a gastropod in the family Cerithiopsidae. It was described by Prkic and Buzzurro in 2007.
