= Cerithiopsis althea =

Scientific classification
- Domain: Eukaryota
- Kingdom: Animalia
- Phylum: Mollusca
- Class: Gastropoda
- Subclass: Caenogastropoda
- Clade: Hypsogastropoda
- Family: Cerithiopsidae
- Genus: Cerithiopsis
- Species: C. althea

Binomial name
- Cerithiopsis althea Dall, 1927

Species of gastropod

Cerithiopsis althea is a species of very small sea snail, a marine gastropod mollusk in the family Cerithiopsidae. This species was described by William Healey Dall in 1927.

== Description ==
The maximum recorded shell length is 8.5 mm (0.33 in).

== Habitat ==
Minimum recorded depth is 538 m (1,765 ft). Maximum recorded depth is 538 m (1,765 ft).
