= Cerithiopsis warmkae =

Scientific classification
- Domain: Eukaryota
- Kingdom: Animalia
- Phylum: Mollusca
- Class: Gastropoda
- Subclass: Caenogastropoda
- Clade: Hypsogastropoda
- Family: Cerithiopsidae
- Genus: Cerithiopsis
- Species: C. warmkae

Binomial name
- Cerithiopsis warmkae Jong & Coomans, 1988

Species of gastropod

Cerithiopsis warmkae is a species of sea snail, a gastropod in the family Cerithiopsidae. It was described by Jong and Coomans, in 1988.

== Description ==
The maximum recorded shell length is 5 mm.

== Habitat ==
Minimum recorded depth is 58 m. Maximum recorded depth is 58 m.
