= Cerithiopsis cruzana =

Scientific classification
- Domain: Eukaryota
- Kingdom: Animalia
- Phylum: Mollusca
- Class: Gastropoda
- Subclass: Caenogastropoda
- Clade: Hypsogastropoda
- Family: Cerithiopsidae
- Genus: Cerithiopsis
- Species: C. cruzana

Binomial name
- Cerithiopsis cruzana Usticke, 1959

Species of gastropod

Cerithiopsis cruzana is a species of sea snail, a gastropod in the family Cerithiopsidae, which is known from the Caribbean Sea and the Gulf of Mexico. It was described by Usticke in 1959.

== Description ==
The maximum recorded shell length is 5 mm.

== Habitat ==
Minimum recorded depth is 55 m. Maximum recorded depth is 101 m.
