= Cerithiopsis parvada =

Scientific classification
- Kingdom: Animalia
- Phylum: Mollusca
- Class: Gastropoda
- Subclass: Caenogastropoda
- Order: incertae sedis
- Family: Cerithiopsidae
- Genus: Cerithiopsis
- Species: C. parvada

Binomial name
- Cerithiopsis parvada Rolán, Espinosa, Fernández-Garcés, 2007

Synonyms
- Costulopsis parvada (Rolán, Espinosa & Fernández-Garcés, 2007); Nanopsis parvada (Rolán, Espinosa & Fernández-Garcés, 2007)

Species of gastropod

Nanopsis parvada is a species of sea snail, a gastropod in the family Cerithiopsidae. It was described by Rolán, Espinosa, and Fernández-Garcés, in 2007.
