= Cerithiopsis gemmulosa =

Scientific classification
- Kingdom: Animalia
- Phylum: Mollusca
- Class: Gastropoda
- Subclass: Caenogastropoda
- Order: incertae sedis
- Family: Cerithiopsidae
- Genus: Cerithiopsis
- Species: C. gemmulosa

Binomial name
- Cerithiopsis gemmulosa (C. B. Adams, 1850)

Species of gastropod

Cerithiopsis gemmulosa is a species of sea snail, a gastropod in the family Cerithiopsidae, which is known from the Gulf of Mexico and the Caribbean Sea. It was described by C. B. Adams, in 1850.

== Description ==
The maximum recorded shell length is 5.3 mm.

== Habitat ==
Minimum recorded depth is 0 m. Maximum recorded depth is 91 m.
