= Cerithiopsis nana =

Scientific classification
- Kingdom: Animalia
- Phylum: Mollusca
- Class: Gastropoda
- Subclass: Caenogastropoda
- Order: incertae sedis
- Family: Cerithiopsidae
- Genus: Cerithiopsis
- Species: C. nana

Binomial name
- Cerithiopsis nana Jeffreys, 1867

Synonyms
- Cerithiopsis tubercularis var. nana Jeffreys, 1867 (original rank as variety); Nanopsis nana (Jeffreys, 1867)

Species of gastropod

Cerithiopsis nana is a species of minute sea snail, a marine gastropod mollusc in the family Cerithiopsidae.

The species was described by Jeffreys in 1867.

== Distribution ==
This species occurs in the Mediterranean Sea off Italy and in the Atlantic Ocean off Portugal.
