= Cerithiopsis petanii =

Scientific classification
- Kingdom: Animalia
- Phylum: Mollusca
- Class: Gastropoda
- Subclass: Caenogastropoda
- Order: incertae sedis
- Family: Cerithiopsidae
- Genus: Cerithiopsis
- Species: C. petanii

Binomial name
- Cerithiopsis petanii Prkic & Mariottini, 2010

Species of gastropod

Cerithiopsis petanii is a species of sea snail, a gastropod in the family Cerithiopsidae.

It was described by J. Prkic and P. Mariottini in 2010, and is known from Croatia.
