= Cerithiopsis aimen =

Scientific classification
- Kingdom: Animalia
- Phylum: Mollusca
- Class: Gastropoda
- Subclass: Caenogastropoda
- Order: incertae sedis
- Family: Cerithiopsidae
- Genus: Cerithiopsis
- Species: C. aimen

Binomial name
- Cerithiopsis aimen Rolán & Espinosa, 1996

Species of gastropod

Cerithiopsis aimen is a species of very small sea snail, a marine gastropod mollusk in the family Cerithiopsidae. This species was described by Emilio Rolán and José Espinosa in 1996.

== Description ==
The maximum recorded shell length is 3.2 mm.

== Habitat ==
Minimum recorded depth is 23 m. Maximum recorded depth is 42 m.
