= Cerithiopsis vicola =

Scientific classification
- Kingdom: Animalia
- Phylum: Mollusca
- Class: Gastropoda
- Subclass: Caenogastropoda
- Order: incertae sedis
- Family: Cerithiopsidae
- Genus: Cerithiopsis
- Species: C. vicola

Binomial name
- Cerithiopsis vicola Dall & Bartsch, 1911

Species of gastropod

Cerithiopsis vicola is a species of sea snail, a gastropod in the family Cerithiopsidae, which is known from the Gulf of Mexico. It was described by Dall and Bartsch, in 1911.

== Description ==
The maximum recorded shell length is 2.9 mm.

== Habitat ==
Minimum recorded depth is 6 m. Maximum recorded depth is 6 m.
