= Cerithiopsis merida =

Scientific classification
- Kingdom: Animalia
- Phylum: Mollusca
- Class: Gastropoda
- Subclass: Caenogastropoda
- Order: incertae sedis
- Family: Cerithiopsidae
- Genus: Cerithiopsis
- Species: C. merida

Binomial name
- Cerithiopsis merida Dall, 1927

Species of gastropod

Cerithiopsis merida is a species of sea snail, a gastropod in the family Cerithiopsidae. It was described by Dall in 1927.

== Description ==
The maximum recorded shell length is 3.6 mm.

== Habitat ==
Minimum recorded depth is 538 m. Maximum recorded depth is 538 m.
