= Cerithiopsis beneitoi =

Scientific classification
- Kingdom: Animalia
- Phylum: Mollusca
- Class: Gastropoda
- Subclass: Caenogastropoda
- Order: incertae sedis
- Family: Cerithiopsidae
- Genus: Cerithiopsis
- Species: C. beneitoi

Binomial name
- Cerithiopsis beneitoi Rolán, Espinosa, Fernández-Garcés, 2007

Synonyms
- Costulopsis beneitoi (Rolán, Espinosa & Fernández-Garcés, 2007); Nanopsis beneitoi (Rolán, Espinosa & Fernández-Garcés, 2007) (basionym)

Species of gastropod

Cerithiopsis beneitoi is a species of sea snail, a gastropod in the family Cerithiopsidae, known from the Gulf of Mexico and described by Rolán, Espinosa and Fernández-Garcés in 2007.
