= Cerithiopsis io =

Scientific classification
- Kingdom: Animalia
- Phylum: Mollusca
- Class: Gastropoda
- Subclass: Caenogastropoda
- Order: incertae sedis
- Family: Cerithiopsidae
- Genus: Cerithiopsis
- Species: C. io

Binomial name
- Cerithiopsis io Dall & Bartsch, 1911

Species of gastropod

Cerithiopsis io is a species of sea snail, a gastropod in the family Cerithiopsidae, which is known from the Caribbean Sea and the Gulf of Mexico. It was described by Dall and Paul Bartsch in 1911.

== Description ==
The maximum recorded shell length is 2.3 mm.

== Habitat ==
Minimum recorded depth is 5.4 m. Maximum recorded depth is 6 m.
