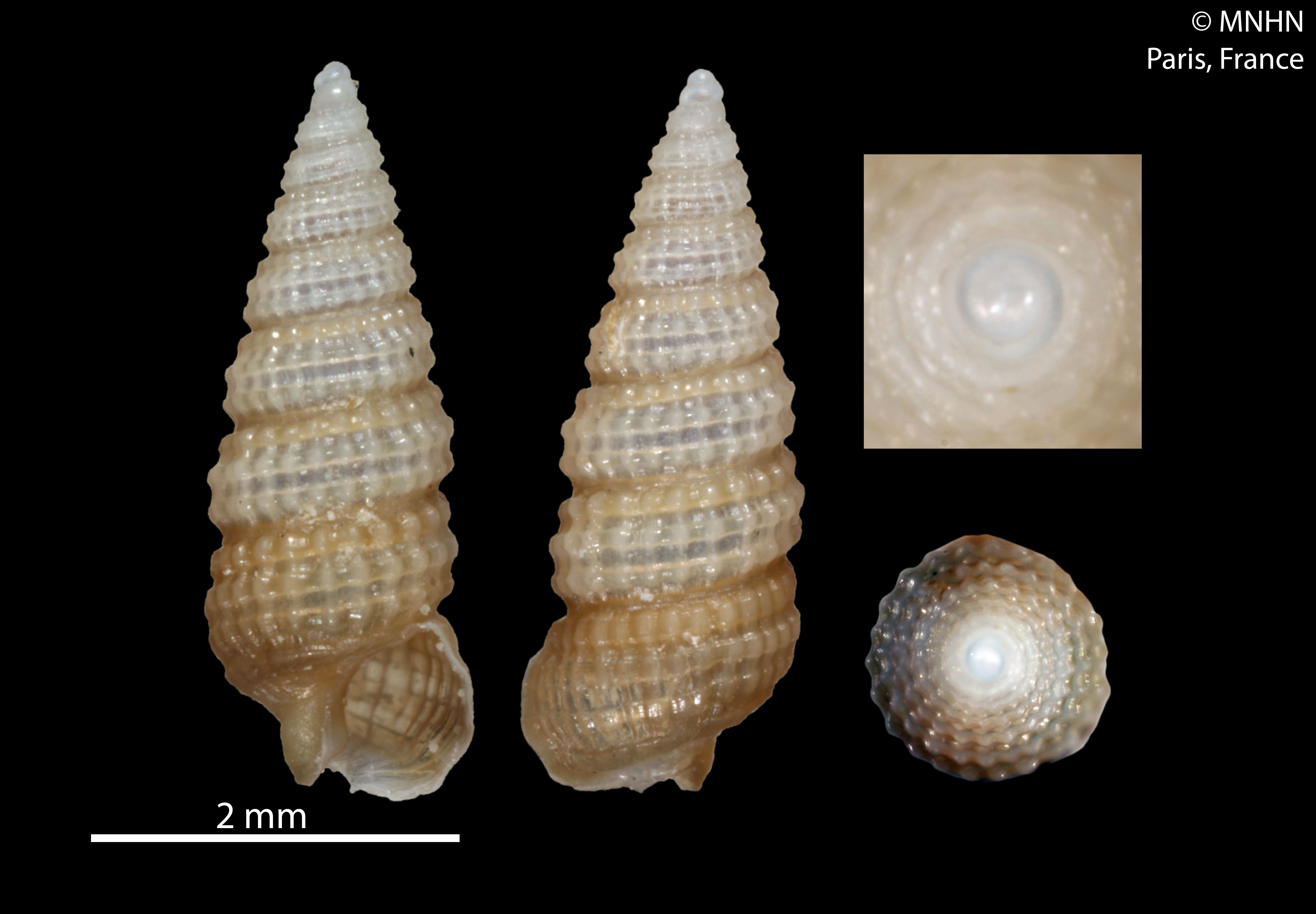

Scientific classification
- Kingdom: Animalia
- Phylum: Mollusca
- Class: Gastropoda
- Subclass: Caenogastropoda
- Order: incertae sedis
- Family: Cerithiopsidae
- Genus: Cerithiopsis
- Species: C. morelosensis

Binomial name
- Cerithiopsis morelosensis Rolán & Fernández-Garcés, 2010

= Cerithiopsis morelosensis =

Species of gastropod

Cerithiopsis morelosensis is a species of sea snail, a gastropod in the family Cerithiopsidae. It was described by Rolán and Fernández-Garcés, in 2010.

== Distribution ==
This marine species occurs off Yucatan, Mexico.
