= Cerithiopsis perlata =

Scientific classification
- Kingdom: Animalia
- Phylum: Mollusca
- Class: Gastropoda
- Subclass: Caenogastropoda
- Order: incertae sedis
- Family: Cerithiopsidae
- Genus: Cerithiopsis
- Species: C. perlata

Binomial name
- Cerithiopsis perlata (Monterosato, 1889)

Species of gastropod

Cerithiopsis perlata is a species of sea snail, a gastropod in the family Cerithiopsidae, which is known from European waters. It was described by Monterosato, in 1889.
