= Cerithiopsis pseudomovilla =

Scientific classification
- Kingdom: Animalia
- Phylum: Mollusca
- Class: Gastropoda
- Subclass: Caenogastropoda
- Order: incertae sedis
- Family: Cerithiopsidae
- Genus: Cerithiopsis
- Species: C. pseudomovilla

Binomial name
- Cerithiopsis pseudomovilla Rolán & Espinosa, 1996

Species of gastropod

Cerithiopsis pseudomovilla is a species of sea snail, a gastropod in the family Cerithiopsidae, which is known from the Caribbean Sea and the Gulf of Mexico. It was described by Rolán and Espinosa, in 1996.

== Description ==
The maximum recorded shell length is 4.7 mm.

== Habitat ==
Minimum recorded depth is 0 m. Maximum recorded depth is 20 m.
