= Cerithiopsis balaustium =

Scientific classification
- Kingdom: Animalia
- Phylum: Mollusca
- Class: Gastropoda
- Subclass: Caenogastropoda
- Order: incertae sedis
- Family: Cerithiopsidae
- Genus: Cerithiopsis
- Species: C. balaustium

Binomial name
- Cerithiopsis balaustium Figueira & Pimenta, 2008

Species of gastropod

Cerithiopsis balaustium is a species of sea snail, a gastropod in the family Cerithiopsidae. It was described by Figueira and Pimenta in 2008.
