= Cerithiopsis flava =

Scientific classification
- Kingdom: Animalia
- Phylum: Mollusca
- Class: Gastropoda
- Subclass: Caenogastropoda
- Order: incertae sedis
- Family: Cerithiopsidae
- Genus: Cerithiopsis
- Species: C. flava

Binomial name
- Cerithiopsis flava (C. B. Adams, 1850)

Species of gastropod

Cerithiopsis flava is a species of sea snail, a gastropod in the family Cerithiopsidae, which is known from the Caribbean Sea and the Gulf of Mexico. It was described by C. B. Adams in 1850.

== Description ==
The maximum recorded shell length is 3.8 mm.

== Habitat ==
Minimum recorded depth is 11 m. Maximum recorded depth is 101 m.
