= Cerithiopsis micalii =

Scientific classification
- Kingdom: Animalia
- Phylum: Mollusca
- Class: Gastropoda
- Subclass: Caenogastropoda
- Order: incertae sedis
- Family: Cerithiopsidae
- Genus: Cerithiopsis
- Species: C. micalii

Binomial name
- Cerithiopsis micalii (Cecalupo & Villari, 1997)

Species of gastropod

Cerithiopsis micalii is a species of sea snail, a gastropod in the family Cerithiopsidae, which is known from European waters. It was described by Cecalupo and Villari, in 1997.
