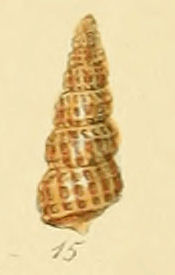

Scientific classification
- Kingdom: Animalia
- Phylum: Mollusca
- Class: Gastropoda
- Subclass: Caenogastropoda
- Order: incertae sedis
- Family: Cerithiopsidae
- Genus: Cerithiopsis
- Species: C. jeffreysi

Binomial name
- Cerithiopsis jeffreysi Watson, 1885

= Cerithiopsis jeffreysi =

Species of gastropod

Cerithiopsis jeffreysi is a species of sea snail, a gastropod in the family Cerithiopsidae, which is known from the Caribbean Sea and European oceans. It was described by Watson in 1885.
