= Cerithiopsis antemunda =

Scientific classification
- Kingdom: Animalia
- Phylum: Mollusca
- Class: Gastropoda
- Subclass: Caenogastropoda
- Order: incertae sedis
- Family: Cerithiopsidae
- Genus: Cerithiopsis
- Species: C. antemunda

Binomial name
- Cerithiopsis antemunda Bartsch, 1911

Species of gastropod

Cerithiopsis antemunda is a species of very small sea snails, marine gastropod molluscs in the family Cerithiopsidae. It was described by Bartsch in 1911.
