= Cerithiopsis cinereoflava =

Scientific classification
- Kingdom: Animalia
- Phylum: Mollusca
- Class: Gastropoda
- Subclass: Caenogastropoda
- Order: incertae sedis
- Family: Cerithiopsidae
- Genus: Cerithiopsis
- Species: C. cinereoflava

Binomial name
- Cerithiopsis cinereoflava (Mörch, 1876)

Species of gastropod

Cerithiopsis cinereoflava is a species of sea snail, a gastropod in the family Cerithiopsidae. It was described by Mörch in 1876.
