= Cerithiopsis academicorum =

Scientific classification
- Kingdom: Animalia
- Phylum: Mollusca
- Class: Gastropoda
- Subclass: Caenogastropoda
- Order: incertae sedis
- Family: Cerithiopsidae
- Genus: Cerithiopsis
- Species: C. academicorum

Binomial name
- Cerithiopsis academicorum Rolán & Espinosa, 1996

Species of gastropod

Cerithiopsis academicorum is a species of very small sea snail, a marine gastropod mollusk in the family Cerithiopsidae. This species is known from the Caribbean Sea and the Gulf of Mexico. It was described by Emilio Rolán and José Espinosa in 1996.

== Description ==
The maximum recorded shell length is 4 mm (0.16 in).

== Habitat ==
Minimum recorded depth is 1 m (3 ft 3 in). Maximum recorded depth is 40 m (130 ft).
