= Cerithiopsis apexcostata =

Scientific classification
- Kingdom: Animalia
- Phylum: Mollusca
- Class: Gastropoda
- Subclass: Caenogastropoda
- Order: incertae sedis
- Family: Cerithiopsidae
- Genus: Cerithiopsis
- Species: C. apexcostata

Binomial name
- Cerithiopsis apexcostata Rolán, Espinosa, Fernández-Garcés, 2007

Species of gastropod

Cerithiopsis apexcostata is a species of very small sea snail, a marine gastropod mollusc in the family Cerithiopsidae. This species was described by Emilio Rolán, José Espinosa, and Fernández-Garcés in 2007.
