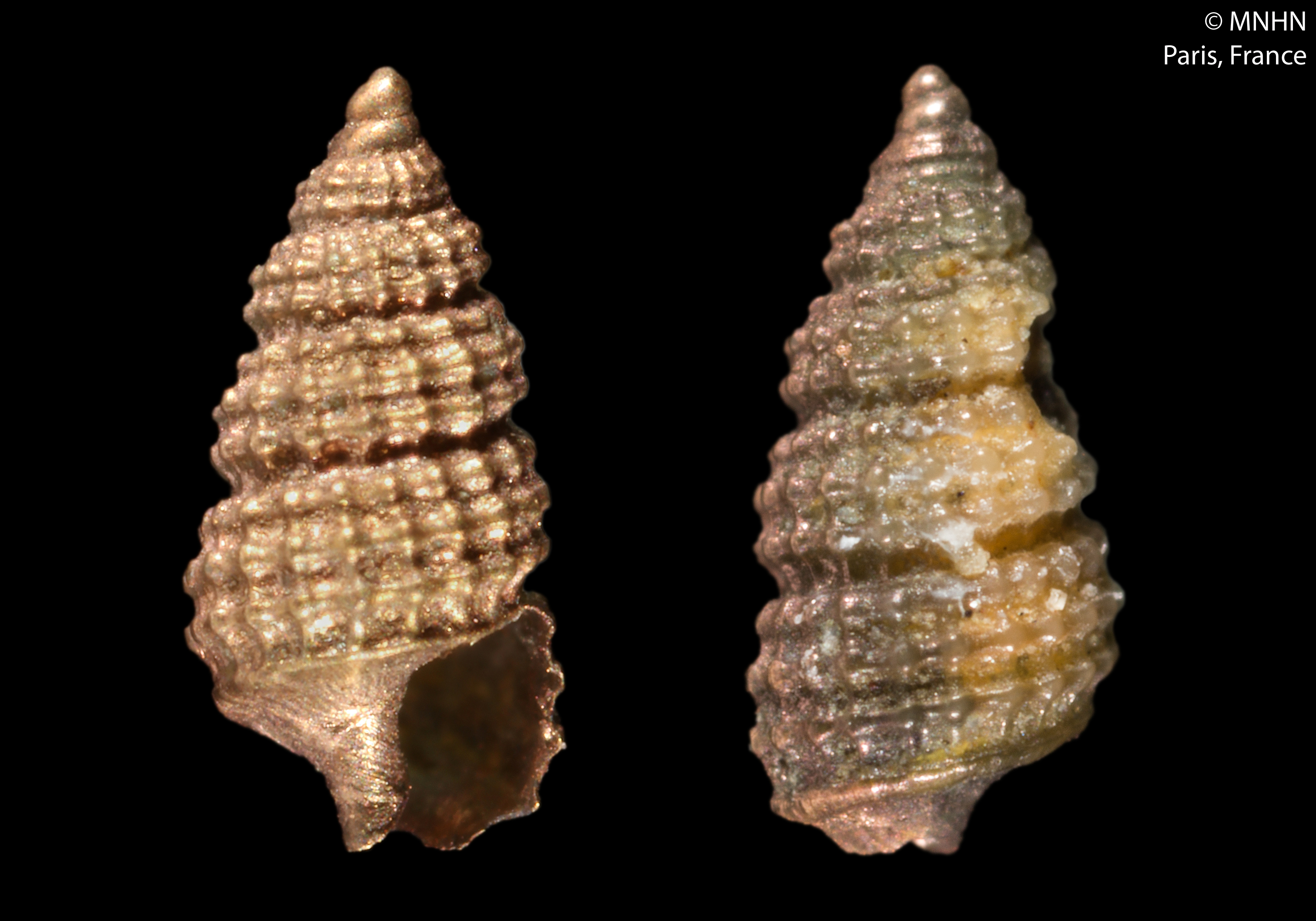
- Shell of Cerithiopsis paucispiralis (paratype at MNHN, Paris)

Scientific classification
- Kingdom: Animalia
- Phylum: Mollusca
- Class: Gastropoda
- Subclass: Caenogastropoda
- Order: incertae sedis
- Family: Cerithiopsidae
- Genus: Cerithiopsis
- Species: C. paucispiralis

Binomial name
- Cerithiopsis paucispiralis Rolán & Fernandes, 1989

= Cerithiopsis paucispiralis =

Species of gastropod

Cerithiopsis paucispiralis is a species of sea snail, a gastropod in the family Cerithiopsidae, which is known from around Cape Verde. It was described by Rolán and Fernandes, in 1989.
