= Cerithiopsis pesa =

Scientific classification
- Kingdom: Animalia
- Phylum: Mollusca
- Class: Gastropoda
- Subclass: Caenogastropoda
- Order: incertae sedis
- Family: Cerithiopsidae
- Genus: Cerithiopsis
- Species: C. pesa

Binomial name
- Cerithiopsis pesa Dall & Bartsch, 1911

Species of gastropod

Cerithiopsis pesa is a species of sea snail, a gastropod in the family Cerithiopsidae. It was described by Dall and Bartsch, in 1911.
