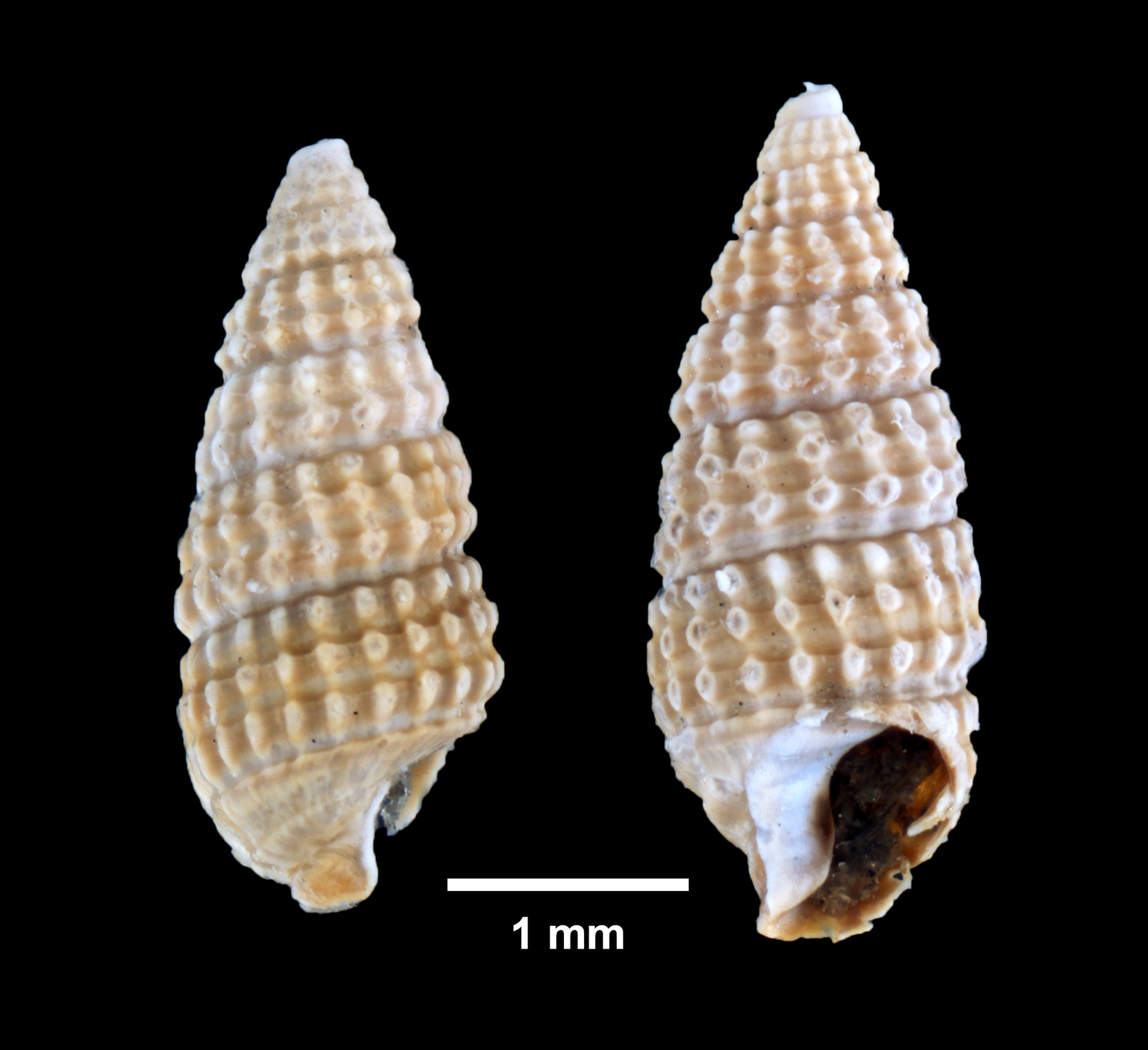

Scientific classification
- Kingdom: Animalia
- Phylum: Mollusca
- Class: Gastropoda
- Subclass: Caenogastropoda
- Order: incertae sedis
- Family: Cerithiopsidae
- Genus: Cerithiopsis
- Species: C. greenii

Binomial name
- Cerithiopsis greenii (C. B. Adams, 1839)

= Cerithiopsis greenii =

Species of gastropod

Cerithiopsis greenii is a species of sea snail, a gastropod in the family Cerithiopsidae, which is known from the Caribbean Sea, Gulf of Mexico, Gulf of Maine, and the northwestern Atlantic Ocean. It was described by C.B. Adams in 1839.

== Description ==
The maximum recorded shell length is 4.6 mm.

== Habitat ==
This species lives in marine environments. The minimum recorded depth for this species is 0 m; maximum recorded depth is 75 m.

== Life cycle & mating behavior ==
Members of the order Neotaenioglossa are mostly gonochoric and broadcast spawners. Starting as embryos they develop into planktonic trocophore larvae and later into juvenile veligers before becoming fully grown adults.
