= Cerithiopsina =

Scientific classification
- Kingdom: Animalia
- Phylum: Mollusca
- Class: Gastropoda
- Subclass: Caenogastropoda
- Order: incertae sedis
- Family: Cerithiopsidae
- Genus: Cerithiopsina; Bartsch, 1911

Type species
- † Cerithiopsis necropolitana Bartsch, 1911

Synonyms
- Cerithiopsis (Cerithiopsina) Bartsch, 1911 (original rank)

Genus of gastropods

Cerithiopsina is a genus of very small sea snails, marine gastropod molluscs in the family Cerithiopsidae. It was described by Paul Bartsch in 1911.

== Species ==
- Cerithiopsina adamsi (Bartsch, 1911)
- † Cerithiopsina necropolitana (Bartsch, 1911)
- Cerithiopsina signa (Bartsch, 1921)
