= Cerithiopsis bakeri =

Scientific classification
- Kingdom: Animalia
- Phylum: Mollusca
- Class: Gastropoda
- Subclass: Caenogastropoda
- Order: incertae sedis
- Family: Cerithiopsidae
- Genus: Cerithiopsis
- Species: C. bakeri

Binomial name
- Cerithiopsis bakeri Bartsch, 1917

Species of gastropod

Cerithiopsis bakeri is a species of very small sea snails, marine gastropod molluscs in the family Cerithiopsidae. It was described by Paul Bartsch in 1917. Cerithiopsis bakeri has been found near the Gulf of Mexico and California.
