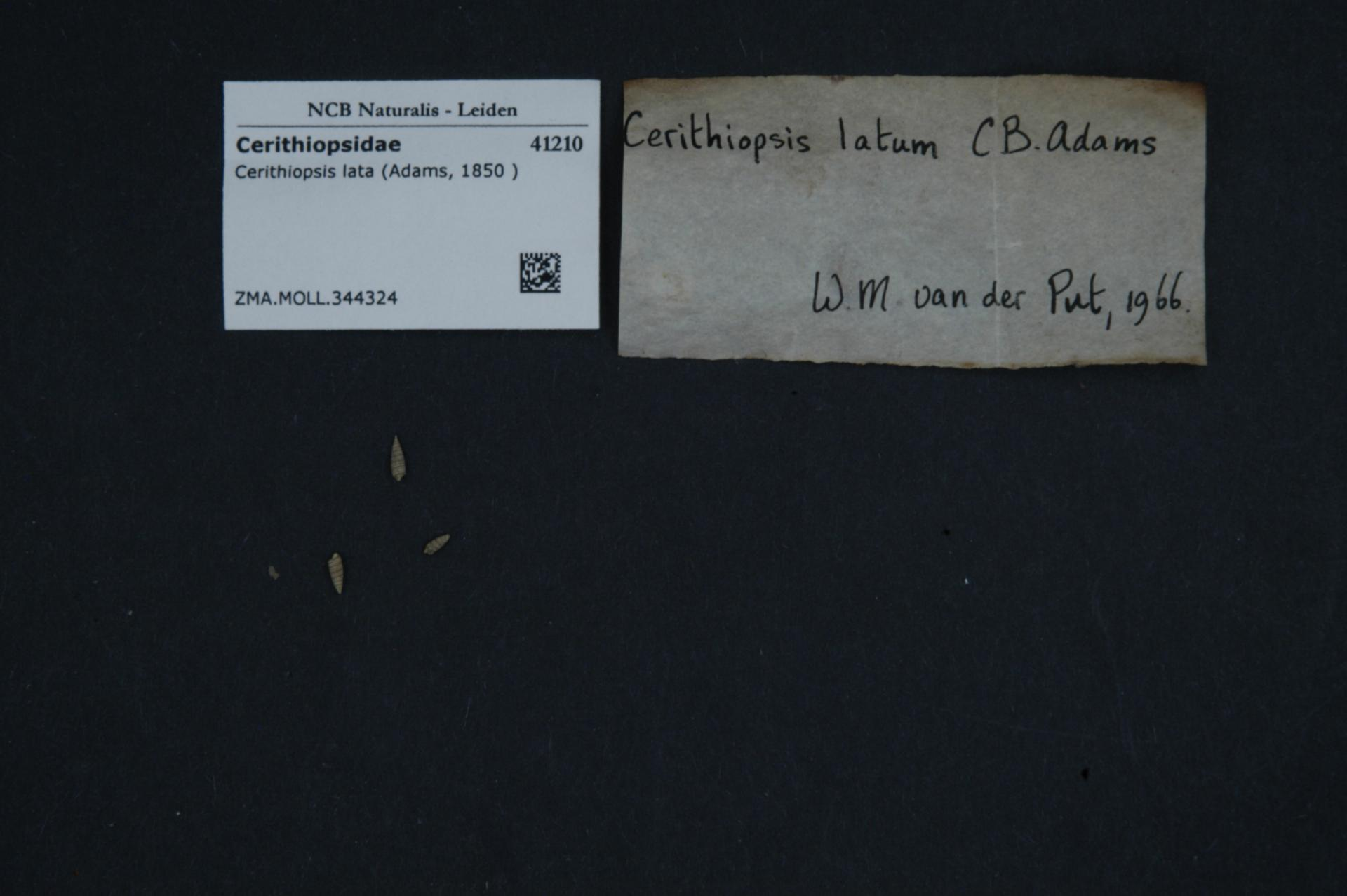
- Cerithiopsis lata

Scientific classification
- Kingdom: Animalia
- Phylum: Mollusca
- Class: Gastropoda
- Subclass: Caenogastropoda
- Order: incertae sedis
- Family: Cerithiopsidae
- Genus: Cerithiopsis
- Species: C. lata

Binomial name
- Cerithiopsis lata (C. B. Adams, 1850)

= Cerithiopsis lata =

Species of gastropod

Cerithiopsis lata is a species of sea snail, a gastropod in the family Cerithiopsidae, which is known from the Caribbean Sea and the Gulf of Mexico. It was originally described by C.B. Adams in 1850.

== Description ==
The maximum recorded shell length is 3.3 mm.

== Habitat ==
Minimum recorded depth is 0 m. Maximum recorded depth is 44 m.
