= Cerithiopsis blandi =

Scientific classification
- Kingdom: Animalia
- Phylum: Mollusca
- Class: Gastropoda
- Subclass: Caenogastropoda
- Order: incertae sedis
- Family: Cerithiopsidae
- Genus: Cerithiopsis
- Species: C. blandi

Binomial name
- Cerithiopsis blandi Deshayes in Vignal, 1900

Species of gastropod

Cerithiopsis blandi is a species of sea snail, a gastropod in the family Cerithiopsidae, which is known from around Madagascar. It was described by Deshayes in Vignal, in 1900.
