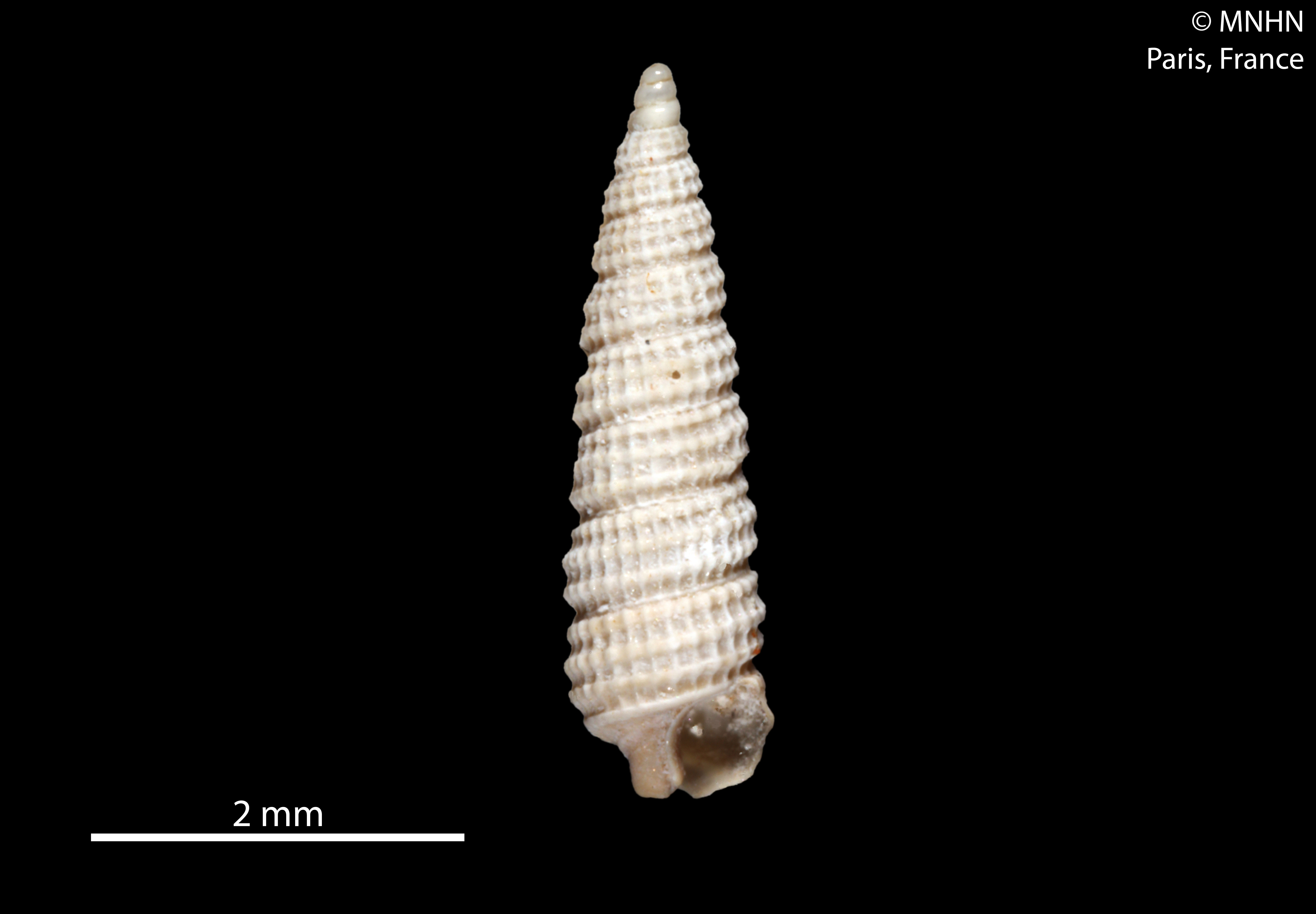
- Shell of Cerithiopsis gordaensis (paratype at MNHN, Paris)

Scientific classification
- Kingdom: Animalia
- Phylum: Mollusca
- Class: Gastropoda
- Subclass: Caenogastropoda
- Order: incertae sedis
- Family: Cerithiopsidae
- Genus: Cerithiopsis
- Species: C. gordaensis

Binomial name
- Cerithiopsis gordaensis Rolán & Fernández-Garcés, 2010

= Cerithiopsis gordaensis =

Species of gastropod

Cerithiopsis gordaensis is a species of sea snail, a gastropod in the family Cerithiopsidae. It was described by Rolán and Fernández-Garcés in 2010.

== Distribution ==
This marine species occurs off Cuba.
