= Cerithiopsis capixaba =

Scientific classification
- Kingdom: Animalia
- Phylum: Mollusca
- Class: Gastropoda
- Subclass: Caenogastropoda
- Order: incertae sedis
- Family: Cerithiopsidae
- Genus: Cerithiopsis
- Species: C. capixaba

Binomial name
- Cerithiopsis capixaba Figueira & Pimenta, 2008

Species of gastropod

Cerithiopsis capixaba is a species of sea snail, a gastropod in the family Cerithiopsidae. It was described by Jay and Drivas in 2002.
