= Cerithiopsis albovittata =

Scientific classification
- Kingdom: Animalia
- Phylum: Mollusca
- Class: Gastropoda
- Subclass: Caenogastropoda
- Order: incertae sedis
- Family: Cerithiopsidae
- Genus: Cerithiopsis
- Species: C. albovittata

Binomial name
- Cerithiopsis albovittata (C. B. Adams, 1850)

Synonyms
- Cerithium albovittatum C. B. Adams, 1850 (basionym); Costulopsis albovittata (C. B. Adams, 1850); Nanopsis albovittata (C. B. Adams, 1850)

Species of gastropod

Cerithiopsis albovittata is a species of very small sea snail, a marine gastropod mollusk in the family Cerithiopsidae. It was described by Charles Baker Adams in 1850.

== Description ==
The maximum recorded shell length is 4 mm.

== Distribution ==
This species is known from the Caribbean Sea, the Gulf of Mexico and the Lesser Antilles.

== Habitat ==
Minimum recorded depth is 11 m. Maximum recorded depth is 11 m.
