= Cerithiopsis aralia =

Scientific classification
- Kingdom: Animalia
- Phylum: Mollusca
- Class: Gastropoda
- Subclass: Caenogastropoda
- Order: incertae sedis
- Family: Cerithiopsidae
- Genus: Cerithiopsis
- Species: C. aralia

Binomial name
- Cerithiopsis aralia Olsson & Harbison, 1953

Species of gastropod

Cerithiopsis aralia is a species of sea snail, a gastropod in the family Cerithiopsidae, which is known from the Gulf of Mexico. It was described by Olsson and Harbison in 1953.

== Description ==
The maximum recorded shell length is 3.3 mm.

== Habitat ==
Minimum recorded depth is 15 m. Maximum recorded depth is 101 m.
