= Cerithiopsis iota =

Scientific classification
- Kingdom: Animalia
- Phylum: Mollusca
- Class: Gastropoda
- Subclass: Caenogastropoda
- Order: incertae sedis
- Family: Cerithiopsidae
- Genus: Cerithiopsis
- Species: C. iota

Binomial name
- Cerithiopsis iota (C. B. Adams, 1845)

Species of mollusc

Cerithiopsis iota is a species of sea snail, a gastropod in the family Cerithiopsidae, which is known from the Gulf of Mexico. It was described by C. B. Adams in 1845.

== Description ==
The maximum recorded shell length is 5 mm.

== Habitat ==
Minimum recorded depth is 7 m. Maximum recorded depth is 115 m.
