= Cerithiopsis denticulata =

Scientific classification
- Kingdom: Animalia
- Phylum: Mollusca
- Class: Gastropoda
- Subclass: Caenogastropoda
- Order: incertae sedis
- Family: Cerithiopsidae
- Genus: Cerithiopsis
- Species: C. denticulata

Binomial name
- Cerithiopsis denticulata (Cecalupo & Robba, 2010)

Synonyms
- Nanopsis denticulata Cecalupo & Robba, 2010

Species of gastropod

Cerithiopsis denticulata is a species of minute sea snail, a marine gastropod mollusc in the family Cerithiopsidae.

The species was described by Cecalupo and Robba in 2010.
