= Cerithiopsis tenthrenois =

Scientific classification
- Kingdom: Animalia
- Phylum: Mollusca
- Class: Gastropoda
- Subclass: Caenogastropoda
- Order: incertae sedis
- Family: Cerithiopsidae
- Genus: Cerithiopsis
- Species: C. tenthrenois

Binomial name
- Cerithiopsis tenthrenois (Melvill, 1896)

Species of gastropod

Cerithiopsis tenthrenois is a species of sea snail, a gastropod in the family Cerithiopsidae, which is known from European waters, including the Mediterranean Sea. It was described by Melvill, in 1896.
