= Cerithiopsis tarruellasi =

Scientific classification
- Kingdom: Animalia
- Phylum: Mollusca
- Class: Gastropoda
- Subclass: Caenogastropoda
- Order: incertae sedis
- Family: Cerithiopsidae
- Genus: Cerithiopsis
- Species: C. tarruellasi

Binomial name
- Cerithiopsis tarruellasi Peñas & Rolán, 2006

Species of gastropod

Cerithiopsis tarruellasi is a species of sea snail, a gastropod in the family Cerithiopsidae. It was described by Peñas and Rolán, in 2006.
