= Cerithiopsis annae =

Scientific classification
- Kingdom: Animalia
- Phylum: Mollusca
- Class: Gastropoda
- Subclass: Caenogastropoda
- Order: incertae sedis
- Family: Cerithiopsidae
- Genus: Cerithiopsis
- Species: C. annae

Binomial name
- Cerithiopsis annae Cecalupo & Buzzurro, 2005

Species of gastropod

Cerithiopsis annae is a species of very small sea snail, a marine gastropod mollusk in the family Cerithiopsidae. This species was described by Cecalupo and Buzzurro in 2005.
