= Cerithiopsis fayalensis =

Scientific classification
- Kingdom: Animalia
- Phylum: Mollusca
- Class: Gastropoda
- Subclass: Caenogastropoda
- Order: incertae sedis
- Family: Cerithiopsidae
- Genus: Cerithiopsis
- Species: C. fayalensis

Binomial name
- Cerithiopsis fayalensis Watson, 1880

Species of gastropod

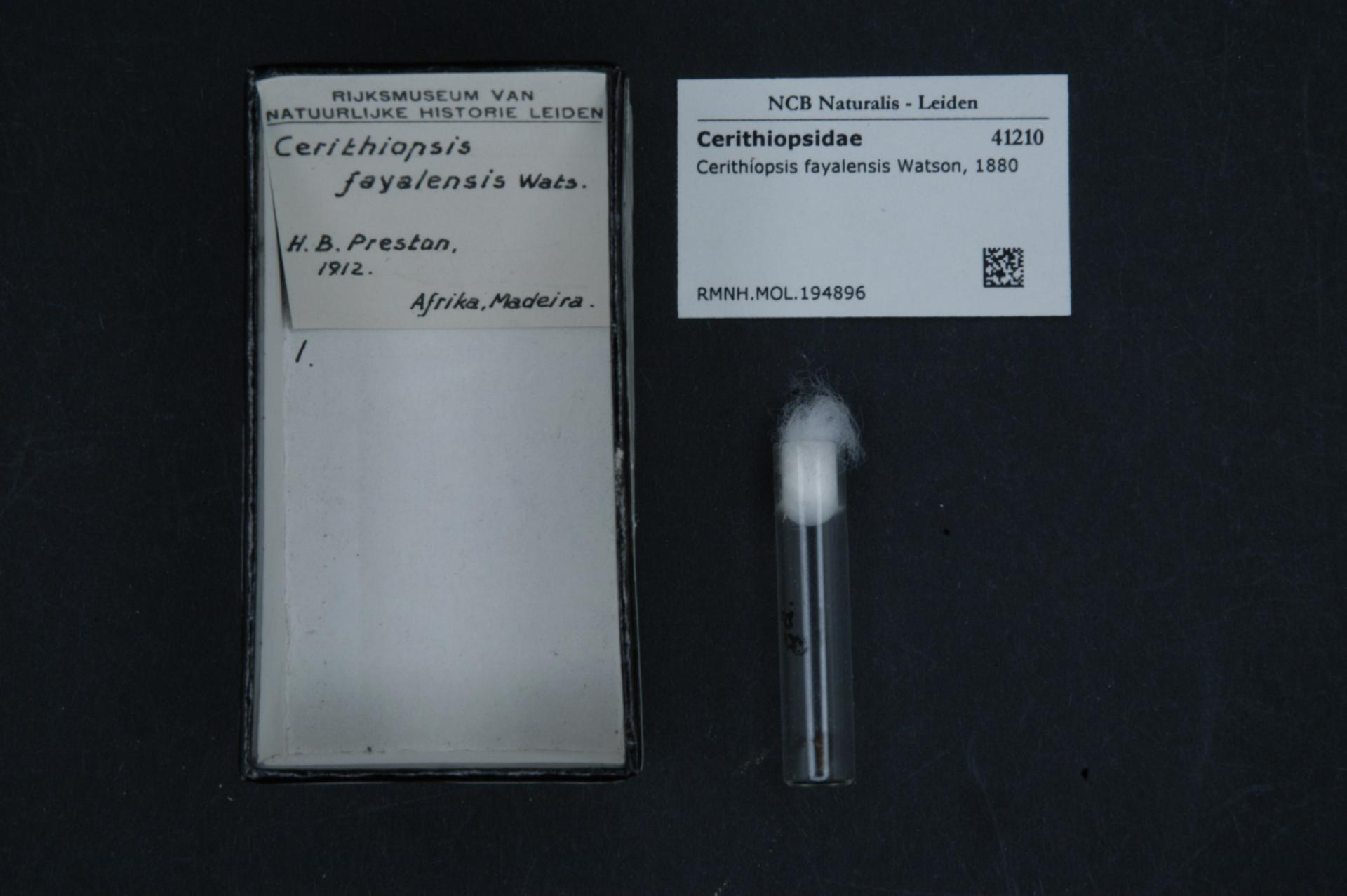

Cerithiopsis fayalensis is a species of sea snail, a gastropod in the family Cerithiopsidae, which is known from the southwestern coast of Apulia, Italy. It was described by Watson in 1880.
