= Cerithiopsis wayae =

Scientific classification
- Kingdom: Animalia
- Phylum: Mollusca
- Class: Gastropoda
- Subclass: Caenogastropoda
- Order: incertae sedis
- Family: Cerithiopsidae
- Genus: Cerithiopsis
- Species: C. wayae

Binomial name
- Cerithiopsis wayae Jay & Drivas, 2002

Species of gastropod

Cerithiopsis wayae is a species of sea snail, a gastropod in the family Cerithiopsidae. It was described by Jay and Drivas, in 2002.
