= Cerithiopsis alabastrula =

Scientific classification
- Kingdom: Animalia
- Phylum: Mollusca
- Class: Gastropoda
- Subclass: Caenogastropoda
- Order: incertae sedis
- Family: Cerithiopsidae
- Genus: Cerithiopsis
- Species: C. alabastrula

Binomial name
- Cerithiopsis alabastrula (Mörch, 1876)

Species of gastropod

Cerithiopsis alabastrula is a species of very small sea snail, a marine gastropod mollusk in the family Cerithiopsidae. This species was described by Otto Andreas Lowson Mörch in 1876.
