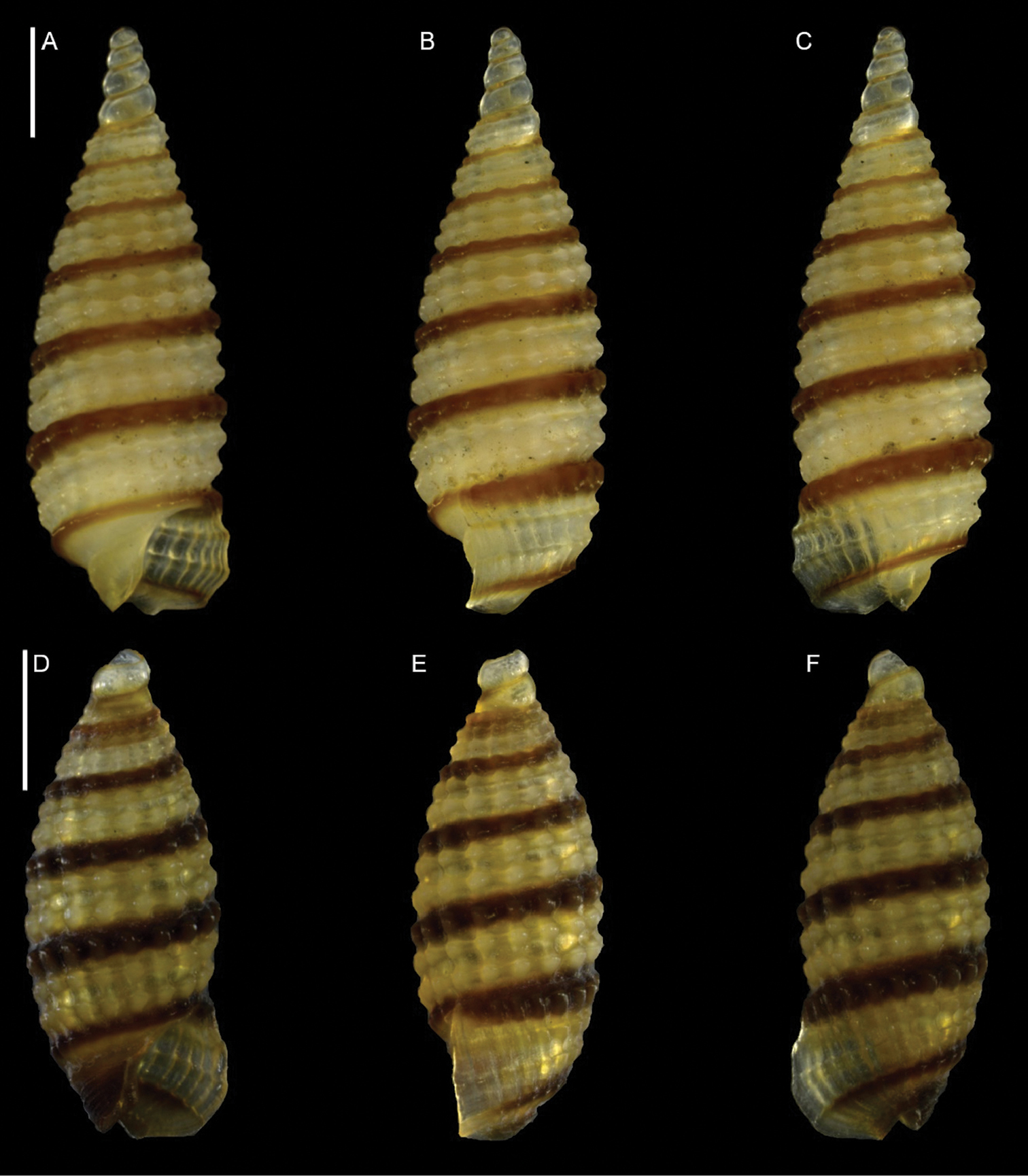

Scientific classification
- Kingdom: Animalia
- Phylum: Mollusca
- Class: Gastropoda
- Subclass: Caenogastropoda
- Order: incertae sedis
- Family: Cerithiopsidae
- Genus: Cerithiopsis
- Species: C. pulvis

Binomial name
- Cerithiopsis pulvis Issel, 1869

Synonyms
- Cerithiopsis pulvis (Issel, 1869); Nanopsis pulvis (Issel, 1869)

= Cerithiopsis pulvis =

Species of gastropod

Cerithiopsis pulvis is a species of sea snail, a gastropod in the family Cerithiopsidae, which is known from European waters, including the Mediterranean Sea. It was described by Issel, in 1869.

== Distribution ==
This species occurs in the North Atlantic Ocean; as an alien species in the Mediterranean Sea (off Lebanon)
