= Cerithiopsis magellanica =

Scientific classification
- Kingdom: Animalia
- Phylum: Mollusca
- Class: Gastropoda
- Subclass: Caenogastropoda
- Order: incertae sedis
- Family: Cerithiopsidae
- Genus: Cerithiopsis
- Species: C. magellanica

Binomial name
- Cerithiopsis magellanica Bartsch, 1911

Species of gastropod

Cerithiopsis magellanica is a species of sea snail, a gastropod in the family Cerithiopsidae. It was described by Bartsch, 1911.

== Description ==
The maximum recorded shell length is 8.5 mm.

== Habitat ==
Minimum recorded depth is 112 m. Maximum recorded depth is 112 m.
