= Cerithiopsis matara =

Scientific classification
- Kingdom: Animalia
- Phylum: Mollusca
- Class: Gastropoda
- Subclass: Caenogastropoda
- Order: incertae sedis
- Family: Cerithiopsidae
- Genus: Cerithiopsis
- Species: C. matara

Binomial name
- Cerithiopsis matara Dall, 1889

Species of gastropod

Cerithiopsis matara is a species of sea snail, a gastropod in the family Cerithiopsidae, which is known from the United Kingdom Exclusive Economic Zone. It was described by Dall in 1889.

== Description ==
The maximum recorded shell length is 9.8 mm.

== Habitat ==
Minimum recorded depth is 183 m. Maximum recorded depth is 183 m.
