= Cerithiopsis vanhyningi =

Scientific classification
- Kingdom: Animalia
- Phylum: Mollusca
- Class: Gastropoda
- Subclass: Caenogastropoda
- Order: incertae sedis
- Family: Cerithiopsidae
- Genus: Cerithiopsis
- Species: C. vanhyningi

Binomial name
- Cerithiopsis vanhyningi Bartsch, 1918

Species of gastropod

Cerithiopsis vanhyningi is a species of sea snail, a gastropod in the family Cerithiopsidae, which is known from the Gulf of Mexico and the Caribbean Sea. It was described by Bartsch, in 1918.

== Description ==
The maximum recorded shell length is 3 mm.

== Habitat ==
Minimum recorded depth is 15 m. Maximum recorded depth is 15 m.
