= Cerithiopsis greppii =

Scientific classification
- Kingdom: Animalia
- Phylum: Mollusca
- Class: Gastropoda
- Subclass: Caenogastropoda
- Order: incertae sedis
- Family: Cerithiopsidae
- Genus: Cerithiopsis
- Species: C. greppii

Binomial name
- Cerithiopsis greppii Buzzurro & Cecalupo, 2005

Species of gastropod

Cerithiopsis greppii is a species of sea snail, a gastropod in the family Cerithiopsidae. It was described by Buzzurro and Cecalupo, in 2005 .
