= Cerithiopsis barleei =

Scientific classification
- Kingdom: Animalia
- Phylum: Mollusca
- Class: Gastropoda
- Subclass: Caenogastropoda
- Order: incertae sedis
- Family: Cerithiopsidae
- Genus: Cerithiopsis
- Species: C. barleei

Binomial name
- Cerithiopsis barleei Jeffreys, 1867

Synonyms
- Cerithiopsis acuminata Hallgass, 1985 (synonym); Cerithiopsis barleii (misspelling); Cerithiopsis contigua Monterosato, 1878

Species of gastropod

Cerithiopsis barleei is a species of minute sea snail, a marine gastropod mollusc in the family Cerithiopsidae. This species is known from Cape Verde, in the Mediterranean Sea, and in the European part of the Atlantic Ocean. It was described by Jeffreys in 1867.
