= Cerithiopsis argentea =

Scientific classification
- Kingdom: Animalia
- Phylum: Mollusca
- Class: Gastropoda
- Subclass: Caenogastropoda
- Order: incertae sedis
- Family: Cerithiopsidae
- Genus: Cerithiopsis
- Species: C. argentea

Binomial name
- Cerithiopsis argentea Dall, 1927

Species of gastropod

Cerithiopsis argentea is a species of sea snail, a gastropod in the family Cerithiopsidae. It was described by Dall in 1927.

== Description ==
The maximum recorded shell length is 5.5 mm (0.22 in).

== Habitat ==
Minimum recorded depth is 805 m (2,641 ft). Maximum recorded depth is 805 m (2,641 ft).
