= Cerithiopsis floridana =

Scientific classification
- Kingdom: Animalia
- Phylum: Mollusca
- Class: Gastropoda
- Subclass: Caenogastropoda
- Order: incertae sedis
- Family: Cerithiopsidae
- Genus: Cerithiopsis
- Species: C. floridana

Binomial name
- Cerithiopsis floridana Dall, 1892

Species of gastropod

Cerithiopsis floridana is a species of sea snail, a gastropod in the family Cerithiopsidae, which is known from the Gulf of Mexico. It was described by Dall in 1892.
