= Cerithiopsis vinca =

Scientific classification
- Kingdom: Animalia
- Phylum: Mollusca
- Class: Gastropoda
- Subclass: Caenogastropoda
- Order: incertae sedis
- Family: Cerithiopsidae
- Genus: Cerithiopsis
- Species: C. vinca

Binomial name
- Cerithiopsis vinca (Melvill, 1896)

Species of gastropod

Cerithiopsis vinca is a species of sea snail, a gastropod in the family Cerithiopsidae, which is known from the Gulf of Mexico. It was described by Olsson and Harbison, in 1953.

== Description ==
The maximum recorded shell length is 5.4 mm.

== Habitat ==
Minimum recorded depth is 0 m. Maximum recorded depth is 4 m.
