= Cerithiopsis serina =

Scientific classification
- Kingdom: Animalia
- Phylum: Mollusca
- Class: Gastropoda
- Subclass: Caenogastropoda
- Order: incertae sedis
- Family: Cerithiopsidae
- Genus: Cerithiopsis
- Species: C. serina

Binomial name
- Cerithiopsis serina Dall, 1927

Species of gastropod

Cerithiopsis serina is a species of sea snail, a gastropod in the family Cerithiopsidae. It was described by Dall in 1927.

== Description ==
The maximum recorded shell length is 4.5 mm.

== Habitat ==
Minimum recorded depth is 538 m. Maximum recorded depth is 805 m.
