= Cerithiopsis diadema =

Scientific classification
- Kingdom: Animalia
- Phylum: Mollusca
- Class: Gastropoda
- Subclass: Caenogastropoda
- Order: incertae sedis
- Family: Cerithiopsidae
- Genus: Cerithiopsis
- Species: C. diadema

Binomial name
- Cerithiopsis diadema Monterosato, 1874

Species of gastropod

Cerithiopsis diadema is a species of sea snail, a gastropod in the family Cerithiopsidae, which is known from European oceans. It was described by Monterosato in 1874.
