= Cerithiopsis apicina =

Scientific classification
- Kingdom: Animalia
- Phylum: Mollusca
- Class: Gastropoda
- Subclass: Caenogastropoda
- Order: incertae sedis
- Family: Cerithiopsidae
- Genus: Cerithiopsis
- Species: C. apicina

Binomial name
- Cerithiopsis apicina Dall, 1927

Species of gastropod

Cerithiopsis apicina is a species of very small sea snail, a marine gastropod mollusk or micromollusk in the family Cerithiopsidae. This species was described by William Healy Dall in 1927.

== Description ==
The maximum recorded shell length is 5.5 mm.

== Habitat ==
Minimum recorded depth is 805 m. Maximum recorded depth is 805 m.
