= Cerithiopsis nofronii =

Scientific classification
- Kingdom: Animalia
- Phylum: Mollusca
- Class: Gastropoda
- Subclass: Caenogastropoda
- Order: incertae sedis
- Family: Cerithiopsidae
- Genus: Cerithiopsis
- Species: C. nofronii

Binomial name
- Cerithiopsis nofronii Amati, 1987

Species of gastropod

Cerithiopsis nofronii is a species of sea snail, a gastropod in the family Cerithiopsidae, which is known from European waters. It was described by Amati in 1987.

== Description ==
Original description: "Small shell of an elongated cone shape, with a slightly cyrtoconoid profile, solid, light brownish colour. Mushroom-shaped protoconch made up of 2.2 whorls, angled due to the presence of a conspicuous central carena beginning immediately after the first half whorl; under the optical microscope (x40) a punctiform microsculpture over the whole surface can be seen. Teleoconch made up of 5/6 convex whorls, sculptured axially, on the body whorl, by 15/18 slightly prosocline riblets. These riblets are intersected by 3 spiral equally raised cordlets, the adapical one always being less developed. The crossing of the two sculptures creates small nodules, quadrangular interspaces, wider than the riblets both axially and spirally. Base limited superiorly by a spiral cordlet, smooth on the inferior part; rotund-quadrangular mouth, curved columella, short siphonal canal. Operculum and soft parts unknown. Maximum dimensions: Height 3.35 mm -Diameter 1.05 mm."

== Distribution ==
"Mediterranean (North and Central Tyrrhenean, Alboran Sea)
in the infra-circalittoral plains at 22-280 metres."
