= Cerithiopsis virginica =

Scientific classification
- Kingdom: Animalia
- Phylum: Mollusca
- Class: Gastropoda
- Subclass: Caenogastropoda
- Order: incertae sedis
- Family: Cerithiopsidae
- Genus: Cerithiopsis
- Species: C. virginica

Binomial name
- Cerithiopsis virginica Henderson & Bartsch, 1914

Species of gastropod

Cerithiopsis virginica is a species of sea snail, a gastropod in the family Cerithiopsidae, which is known from the northwestern Atlantic Ocean. It was described by Henderson and Bartsch, in 1914.
