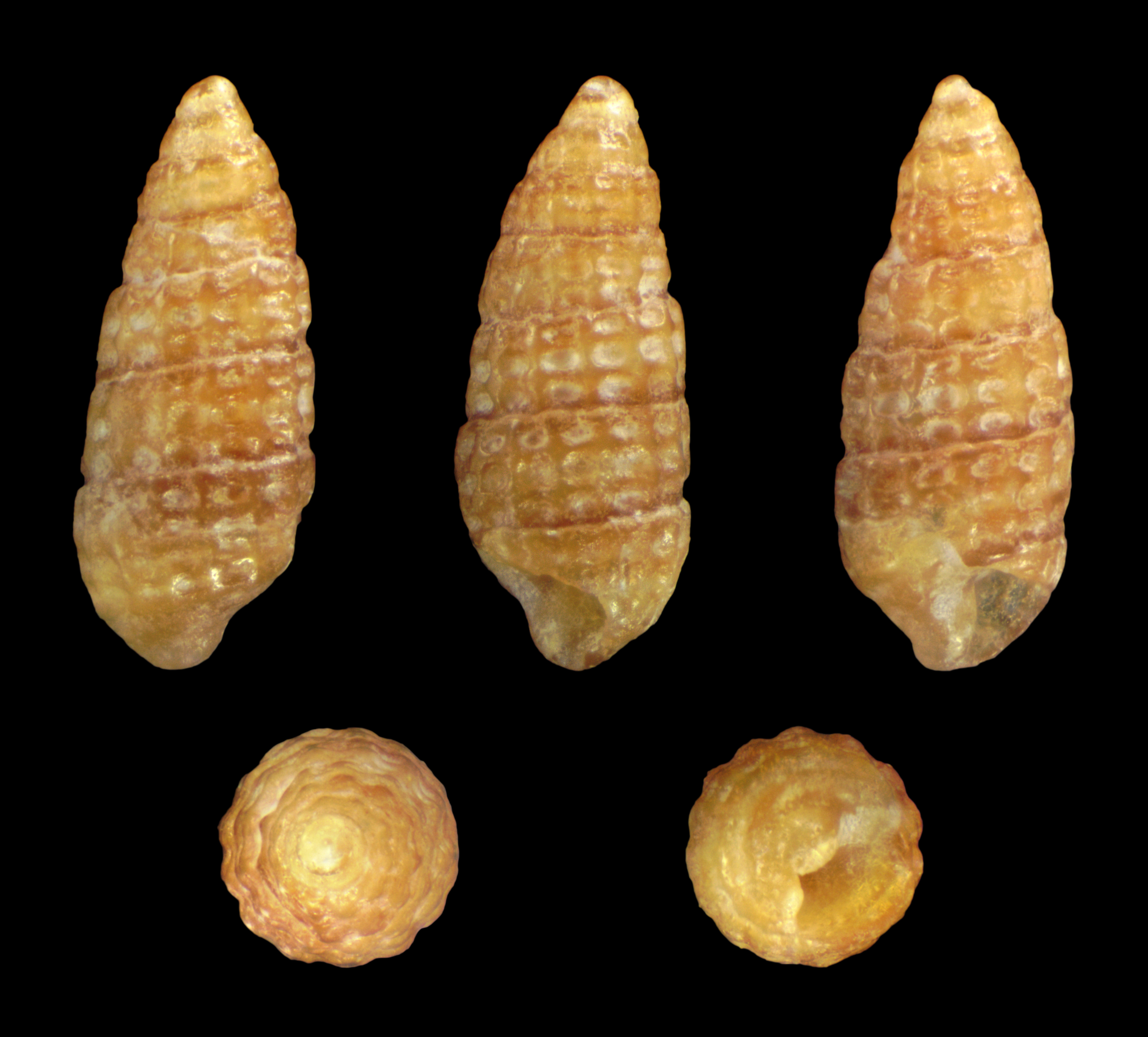

Scientific classification
- Kingdom: Animalia
- Phylum: Mollusca
- Class: Gastropoda
- Subclass: Caenogastropoda
- Order: incertae sedis
- Family: Cerithiopsidae
- Genus: Cerithiopsis
- Species: C. minima

Binomial name
- Cerithiopsis minima (Brusina, 1865)

= Cerithiopsis minima =

Species of gastropod

Cerithiopsis minima is a species of sea snail, a gastropod in the family Cerithiopsidae, which is known from the Atlantic and Pacific Ocean. It was described by Brusina in 1865.
