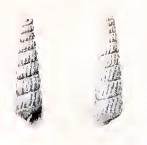
- Apertural and abapertural view of a shell of Turbonilla melvilli

Scientific classification
- Kingdom: Animalia
- Phylum: Mollusca
- Class: Gastropoda
- Family: Pyramidellidae
- Genus: Turbonilla
- Species: T. melvilli

Binomial name
- Turbonilla melvilli Dautzenberg, 1912

Synonyms
- Turbonilla aartseni Schander, 1994

= Turbonilla melvilli =

Species of gastropod

Turbonilla melvilli is a species of sea snail, a marine gastropod mollusk in the family Pyramidellidae, the pyrams and their allies.

This species was named for Mr. Cosmo Melvill, Malacological Society of London.

== Description ==
The white shell has an elongate-conic shape. Its length measures 2.8 mm. The three whorls of the protoconch are smooth and heterostrophic, i. e. coiled in the opposite direction to the whorls of the teleoconch. The teleoconch contains 8 whorls separated by a pronounced suture. These whorls are marked by slightly sigmoid, oblique, axial ribs. The intercostal spaces are wider than the ribs and become abruptly limited at the periphery. The body whorl contains 15 ribs that gradually fade out at the base. The aperture is subquadrangular. The outer lip is thin and almost straight. The slender columella is straight. and not twisted. The base of the shell is well rounded.

== Distribution ==
This species occurs in the Atlantic Ocean off West Africa.
