= Cerithiopsina signa =

Scientific classification
- Kingdom: Animalia
- Phylum: Mollusca
- Class: Gastropoda
- Subclass: Caenogastropoda
- Order: incertae sedis
- Family: Cerithiopsidae
- Genus: Cerithiopsina
- Species: C. signa

Binomial name
- Cerithiopsina signa (Bartsch, 1921)

Species of gastropod

Cerithiopsina signa is a species of very small sea snails, marine gastropod molluscs in the family Cerithiopsidae. It was described by Bartsch in 1921.
