= Joculator ridiculus =

Scientific classification
- Kingdom: Animalia
- Phylum: Mollusca
- Class: Gastropoda
- Subclass: Caenogastropoda
- Order: incertae sedis
- Family: Cerithiopsidae
- Genus: Joculator
- Species: J. ridiculus

Binomial name
- Joculator ridiculus (Watson, 1886)

Species of gastropod

Joculator ridiculus is a species of small sea snail, a marine gastropod mollusc in the family Cerithiopsidae. The species was described by Watson in 1886.
