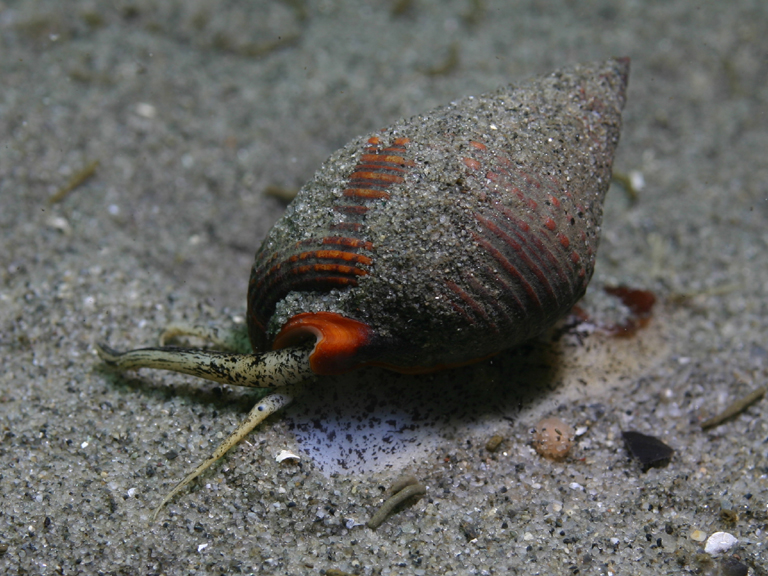
- A live channeled basket snail in situ

Scientific classification
- Kingdom: Animalia
- Phylum: Mollusca
- Class: Gastropoda
- Subclass: Caenogastropoda
- Order: Neogastropoda
- Family: Nassariidae
- Genus: Nassarius
- Species: N. fossatus

Binomial name
- Nassarius fossatus (Gould, 1850)

Synonyms
- Buccinum elegans Reeve, 1842; Buccinum fossatum Gould, 1850; Nassa morleti Crosse, 1867; Nassa reevei A. Adams, 1852

= Nassarius fossatus =

Species of gastropod

Nassarius fossatus, the channeled basket snail, is a species of sea snail, a marine gastropod mollusc in the family Nassariidae, the nassa mud snails or dog whelks. It is native to the west coast of North America where it is found on mudflats on the foreshore and on sand and mud in shallow water.

== Description ==
This is one of the largest mud snails in the genus and has a robust shell that can reach nearly 5 cm (2 in) long. The width of the body whorl of the spirally coiled shell is about half the total length of the shell and there are about six further whorls of diminishing size. There is a distinctive transverse groove on the lowermost portion of the body whorl. The surface of the shell is sculpted with fine axial ribs and spiral ridges, giving it a basket-like texture. The aperture is less than half the diameter of the shell and can be closed by a horny operculum. There is a siphonal notch at the edge of the aperture through which a breathing siphon can be extended. The lip of the aperture is finely toothed at the margin and slightly ridged inside. The columella (the central supporting structure around which the shell is coiled) is thickened at the aperture and is usually orange. The rest of the shell surface is grayish-brown or ashy gray and is matte in appearance.

== Distribution and habitat ==
This species is native to the coasts adjoining the northeastern Pacific Ocean. Its range extends from Vancouver Island to Baja California. It is found intertidally on mudflats and also subtidally on sandy and muddy substrates to a depth of about 18 m (59 ft).

== Behavior ==
Nassarius fossatus is a predator and scavenger. When the tide is out it crawls across the surface of the mud leaving a distinctive trail. It is able to detect odors with its long proboscis and when it finds something edible, it winds its foot round it and rasps at the surface with its radula. A dead fish in a creek has been found to attract snails from as far away as 30 m (98 ft) downstream. N. fossatus can similarly detect the approach of a predator such as the starfish Pisaster brevispinus. Its reaction is either to crawl away rapidly, rocking its shell from side to side, or do a spectacular flip or series of flips, catapulting itself with its muscular foot.

Nassarius fossatus lays its eggs on eelgrass or some other solid object on the surface of the mudflats. First it cleans a portion of leaf blade with its radula, then it forms a fold in its foot connecting its genital pore with its mucous pedal gland. The egg mass passes along this fold and the pedal gland is used to cement the egg capsule to the leaf blade. This process takes about ten minutes, during which time the snail's body and shell oscillate from side to side. After this, the snail moves forward slightly and repeats the process, eventually producing a series of flattened capsules that overlap each other giving a shingled effect. A typical egg string may contain 45 eggs and be 6 cm (2.4 in) long.
