= Joculator tribulationis =

Scientific classification
- Kingdom: Animalia
- Phylum: Mollusca
- Class: Gastropoda
- Subclass: Caenogastropoda
- Order: incertae sedis
- Family: Cerithiopsidae
- Genus: Joculator
- Species: J. tribulationis

Binomial name
- Joculator tribulationis (Hedley, 1909)

Species of gastropod

Joculator tribulationis is a species of minute sea snail, a marine gastropod mollusc in the family Cerithiopsidae. The species was described by Hedley in 1909.
