= Trochocerithium shikoensis =

Scientific classification
- Kingdom: Animalia
- Phylum: Mollusca
- Class: Gastropoda
- Subclass: Caenogastropoda
- Order: incertae sedis
- Family: Plesiotrochidae
- Genus: Trochocerithium
- Species: T. shikoense

Binomial name
- Trochocerithium shikoense (Yokoyama, 1928)

Synonyms
- List: Cerithiopsis excelsum Yokoyama, 1928; Cerithiopsis shikoensis Yokoyama, 1928; Orectospira shikoensis (Yokoyama, 1928); †Trochocerithium gloriamaris Beets, 1950

Species of gastropod

Trochocerithium shikoensis is a species of sea snail, a marine gastropod mollusk in the family Plesiotrochidae.
