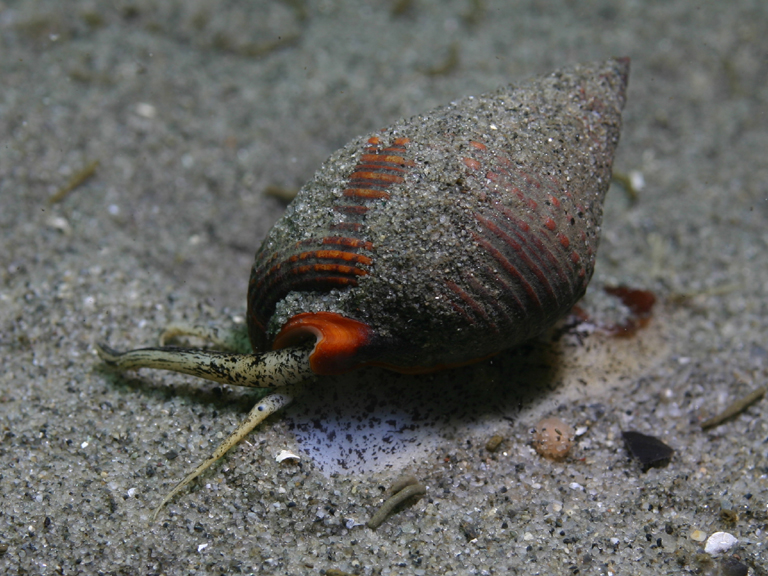
- Nassarius fossatus from family Nassariidae

Scientific classification
- Kingdom: Animalia
- Phylum: Mollusca
- Class: Gastropoda
- Subclass: Caenogastropoda
- Clade: Hypsogastropoda; Ponder & Lindberg, 1997

Clades
- clade Littorinimorpha informal group Ptenoglossa clade Neogastropoda

= Hypsogastropoda =

Clade containing marine gastropods

Hypsogastropoda is a clade containing marine gastropods within the clade Caenogastropoda.

This clade is considered by the database WoRMS as an alternate representation.

This clade contains two clades and one informal group:

- Clade Littorinimorpha
- Informal group Ptenoglossa
- Clade Neogastropoda

== See also ==
- Sorbeoconcha
