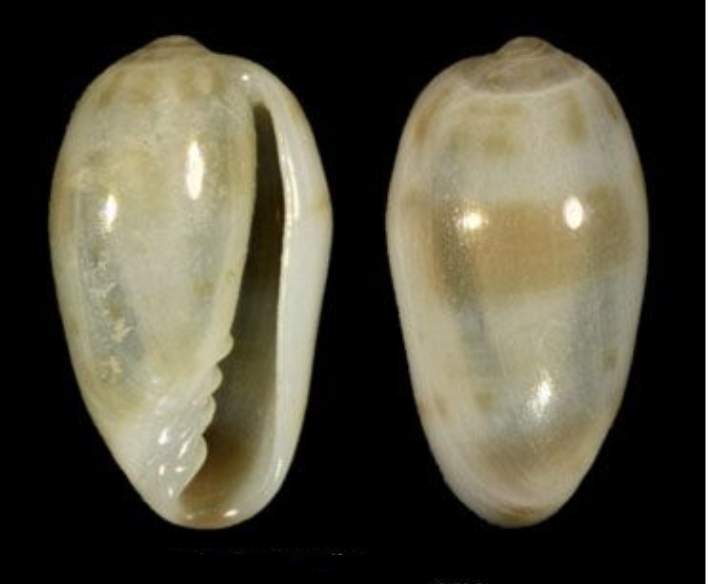
- Shell of Volvarina agata (speciemn at the Natural History Museum, Rotterdam)

Scientific classification
- Kingdom: Animalia
- Phylum: Mollusca
- Class: Gastropoda
- Subclass: Caenogastropoda
- Order: Neogastropoda
- Family: Marginellidae
- Genus: Volvarina
- Species: V. agata

Binomial name
- Volvarina agata (Laseron, 1957)

Synonyms
- Haloginella agata Laseron, 1957

= Volvarina agata =

Species of gastropod

Volvarina agata is a species of sea snail, a marine gastropod mollusk in the family Marginellidae, the margin snails.

This name is not an homonym of Volvarina agatha (Laseron 1957 as both species have a different holotype, located in the Australian Museum.

== Description ==
The length of the shell attains 6 mm.

== Distribution ==
This marine species is endemic to Australia and occurs off New South Wales and Queensland.
