= Horologica bicolor =

Scientific classification
- Kingdom: Animalia
- Phylum: Mollusca
- Class: Gastropoda
- Subclass: Caenogastropoda
- Order: incertae sedis
- Family: Cerithiopsidae
- Genus: Horologica
- Species: H. bicolor

Binomial name
- Horologica bicolor Laseron, 1956

Species of gastropod

Horologica bicolor is a species of sea snail, a gastropod in the family Cerithiopsidae. It was described by Laseron, in 1956.
