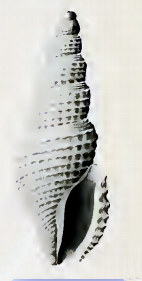
- Original image of a shell of Filodrillia ornata

Scientific classification
- Kingdom: Animalia
- Phylum: Mollusca
- Class: Gastropoda
- Subclass: Caenogastropoda
- Order: Neogastropoda
- Superfamily: Conoidea
- Family: Borsoniidae
- Genus: Filodrillia; Hedley, 1922

Type species
- Drillia tricarinata Tenison-Woods, 1878

Species
- See text

= Filodrillia =

Genus of gastropods

Filodrillia is a genus of sea snails, marine gastropod mollusks in the family Borsoniidae, the cone snails and their allies.

== Description ==
Filodrillia is a genus from deep water which resembles Etrema in the form of the sinus, but not of the protoconch, but differs in the thin slender shell, turreted whorls, absence of ribs and varix. The spiral sculpture predominates.

== Distribution ==
This marine genus is endemic to Australia and occurs off New South Wales, South Australia, Tasmania and Victoria.

== Species ==
Species within the genus Filodrillia include:

- Filodrillia aikeni Stahlschmidt, 2015
- Filodrillia angulifera Cotton, 1947
- Filodrillia columnaria Hedley, 1922
- Filodrillia crebrespirata (Verco, 1909)
- Filodrillia delicatula Laseron, 1954
- Filodrillia dolorosa (Thiele, 1925)
- Filodrillia dulcis (G. B. Sowerby III, 1896)
- Filodrillia haswelli (Hedley, 1907)
- Filodrillia lacteola (Verco, 1909)
- † Filodrillia ludbrookae A. W. B. Powell, 1944
- Filodrillia mucronata Hedley, 1922
- Filodrillia ordinata Laseron, 1954
- Filodrillia ornata Hedley, 1922
- † Filodrillia oyamai Shuto, 1961
- † Filodrillia peramoena (Ludbrook, 1941)
- Filodrillia pergradata Cotton, 1947
- Filodrillia stadialis Hedley, 1922
- Filodrillia teres Laseron, 1954
- Filodrillia thornleyana Laseron, 1954
- Filodrillia tricarinata (Tenison-Woods, 1878)
- Filodrillia trophonoides (Verco, 1909)
- † Filodrillia turricula A. W. B. Powell, 1944
- Filodrillia vitrea Laseron, 1954

Species brought into synonymy

- Filodrillia recta (Hedley, 1903): synonym of Austrocarina recta (Hedley, 1903)
- † Filodrillia rupta Marwick, 1931: synonym of † Drilliola rupta (Marwick, 1931) (original combination)
- Filodrillia steira Hedley, 1922: synonym of Austroturris steira (Hedley, 1922)
- † Filodrillia steiroides Chapman & Crespin, 1928: synonym of Microdrillia steiroides (Chapman & Crespin, 1928)
- †Filodrillia studiosorum L. C. King, 1933 : synonym of † Maoritomella studiosorum (L. C. King, 1933) (original combination)
- † Filodrillia torquatella Marwick, 1931 : synonym of † Maoritomella torquatella (Marwick, 1931) (original combination)
- † Filodrillia turrita Chapple, 1941 : synonym of † Mauidrillia turrita (Chapple, 1941)
