= Gibberula compressa =

Scientific classification
- Kingdom: Animalia
- Phylum: Mollusca
- Class: Gastropoda
- Subclass: Caenogastropoda
- Order: Neogastropoda
- Family: Cystiscidae
- Subfamily: Cystiscinae
- Genus: Gibberula
- Species: G. compressa

Binomial name
- Gibberula compressa (Laseron, 1957)

Synonyms
- Phyloginella compressa Laseron, 1957

Species of gastropod

Gibberula compressa is a species of sea snail, a marine gastropod mollusk, in the family Cystiscidae.
