= Filodrillia ordinata =

Scientific classification
- Kingdom: Animalia
- Phylum: Mollusca
- Class: Gastropoda
- Subclass: Caenogastropoda
- Order: Neogastropoda
- Superfamily: Conoidea
- Family: Borsoniidae
- Genus: Filodrillia
- Species: F. ordinata

Binomial name
- Filodrillia ordinata Laseron, 1954

Species of gastropod

Filodrillia ordinata is a species of sea snail, a marine gastropod mollusk in the family Borsoniidae. This species was first described by Charles Francis Laseron in 1954.

== Description ==
The shell of Filodrillia ordinata is relatively small, with a height that can reach up to 7.7 mm. The aperture is narrow, and the outer lip is thin and slightly flared.

== Distribution ==
This marine species is endemic to Australia and occurs off New South Wales, Tasmania and Victoria. The species inhabits shallow to moderately deep waters, typically at depths ranging from 10 to 50 meters.
