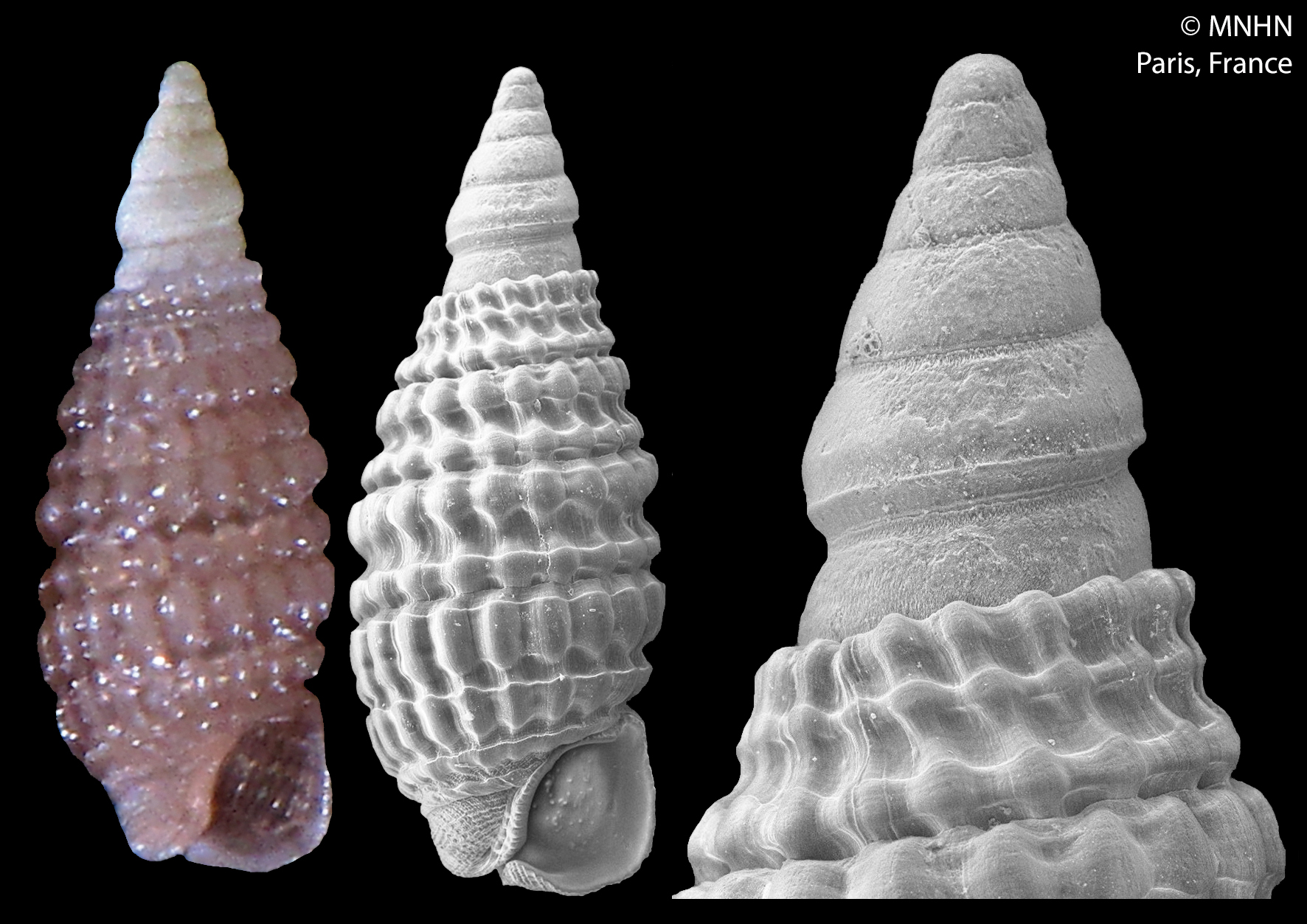
- Shell of Horologica abdita (holotype at MNHN, Paris)

Scientific classification
- Kingdom: Animalia
- Phylum: Mollusca
- Class: Gastropoda
- Subclass: Caenogastropoda
- Order: incertae sedis
- Family: Cerithiopsidae
- Genus: Horologica; Laseron, 1956

Type species
- Horologica bicolor Laseron, 1956

Species
- See text

Synonyms
- Horaiclavus (Cytharoclavus) Kuroda & Oyama, 1971· accepted, alternate representation

= Horologica =

Genus of gastropods

Horologica is a genus of minute sea snails, marine gastropod molluscs in the family Cerithiopsidae.

This genus was described by Laseron in 1956.

== Species ==
Species in the genus Horologica include:

- Horologica abdita Cecalupo & Perugia, 2018
- Horologica acuta Cecalupo & Perugia, 2013
- Horologica affinis Cecalupo & Perugia, 2012
- Horologica albino Laseron, 1956
- Horologica alligata Cecalupo & Perugia, 2012
- Horologica alternata Cecalupo & Perugia, 2012
- Horologica amoena Cecalupo & Perugia, 2013
- Horologica anisocorda Jay & Drivas, 2002
- Horologica annagregis Cecalupo & Perugia, 2013
- Horologica arbastoi Cecalupo & Perugia, 2013
- Horologica balteata (Watson, 1881)
- Horologica barrieria Nützel, 1998
- Horologica bicolor Laseron, 1956
- Horologica bipartita Laseron, 1956
- Horologica camprinii Cecalupo & Perugia, 2014
- Horologica chaillei Cecalupo & Perugia, 2017
- Horologica clara Cecalupo & Perugia, 2012
- Horologica cowei Marshall, 1978
- Horologica diffusa Cecalupo & Perugia, 2012
- Horologica dirempta (Odhner, 1924)
- Horologica eolomitres (Melvill & Standen, 1896)
- Horologica faustinatoi Cecalupo & Perugia, 2014
- Horologica flava Cecalupo & Perugia, 2013
- Horologica forlii Cecalupo & Perugia, 2019
- Horologica fraudulenta Cecalupo & Perugia, 2013
- Horologica fuscocincta Cecalupo & Perugia, 2013
- Horologica gediceae Cecalupo & Perugia, 2014
- Horologica gilvocincta Cecalupo & Perugia, 2018
- Horologica glaubrechti Jay & Drivas, 2002
- Horologica gregaria Cecalupo & Perugia, 2012
- Horologica gwenaellae Cecalupo & Perugia, 2013
- Horologica gypsata Cecalupo & Perugia, 2012
- Horologica hombouyi Cecalupo & Perugia, 2017
- Horologica infuscata Cecalupo & Perugia, 2012
- Horologica interiecta Cecalupo & Perugia, 2016
- Horologica iucunda Cecalupo & Perugia, 2013
- Horologica jayi Cecalupo & Perugia, 2012
- Horologica konops Jay & Drivas, 2002
- Horologica lavanonoensis Cecalupo & Perugia, 2014
- Horologica lizardensis Nützel, 1998
- Horologica loyaltyensis Cecalupo & Perugia, 2017
- Horologica luculenta Cecalupo & Perugia, 2012
- Horologica macrocephala Laseron, 1956
- Horologica macrometrica Laseron, 1956
- Horologica magnifica Cecalupo & Perugia, 2012
- Horologica marianii Cecalupo & Perugia, 2012
- Horologica martini Jay & Drivas, 2002
- Horologica micaelae Cecalupo & Perugia, 2012
- Horologica minareta Laseron, 1956
- Horologica montii Cecalupo & Perugia, 2013
- Horologica musii Chen, Tseng & Lo, 2012
- Horologica niuginiensis Cecalupo & Perugia, 2018
- Horologica nodosa Cecalupo & Perugia, 2012
- Horologica passerina Chen, Tseng & Lo, 2012
- Horologica paupercula Cecalupo & Perugia, 2012
- Horologica pavesii Cecalupo & Perugia, 2012
- Horologica pinea (Hedley, 1909)
- Horologica pracchiai Cecalupo & Perugia, 2018
- Horologica prelleana Cecalupo & Perugia, 2012
- Horologica pupa (Dall & Simpson, 1901)
- Horologica purpurea Laseron, 1956
- Horologica rauli Rolán & Espinosa, 1992
- Horologica rinaldii Cecalupo & Perugia, 2013
- Horologica rubiginosa Cecalupo & Perugia, 2018
- Horologica rubrostriata Cecalupo & Perugia, 2013
- Horologica santoensis Cecalupo & Perugia, 2013
- Horologica segurinii Cecalupo & Perugia, 2012
- Horologica semipicta (Gould, 1861)
- Horologica siapoi Cecalupo & Perugia, 2017
- Horologica siazei Cecalupo & Perugia, 2017
- Horologica splendida Cecalupo & Perugia, 2012
- Horologica tabanellii Cecalupo & Perugia, 2012
- Horologica tabensis Cecalupo & Perugia, 2018
- Horologica taeniata Cecalupo & Perugia, 2013
- Horologica telegraphica (Hedley, 1909)
- Horologica teruyai Cecalupo & Perugia, 2019
- Horologica tsaoi Chen, Tseng & Lo, 2012
- † Horologica turpis Lozouet, 1999
- Horologica turrigera (Watson, 1886)
- † Horologica violator (Laws, 1944)
- Horologica virginieae Cecalupo & Perugia, 2012
- Horologica westiana (Hedley, 1909)
- Horologica yabobensis Cecalupo & Perugia, 2018

Taxon inquirendum

- Horologica aeolomitres (Melvill & Standen, 1896)

Species brought into synonymy

- Horologica cubensis Rolán & Espinosa, 1992: synonym of Belonimorphis cubensis (Rolán & Espinosa, 1992) (original combination)
- Horologica pulchella (C. B. Adams, 1850): synonym of Horologica pupa (Dall & Simpson, 1901)
