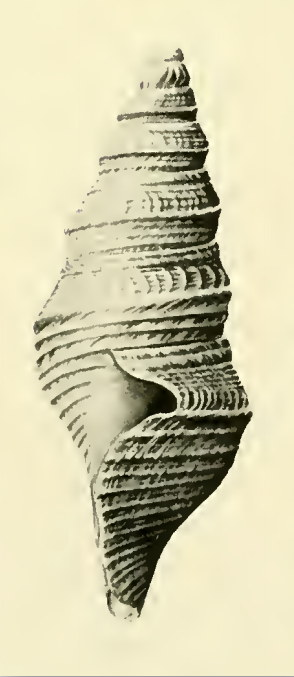
- Austroturris steira

Scientific classification
- Kingdom: Animalia
- Phylum: Mollusca
- Class: Gastropoda
- Subclass: Caenogastropoda
- Order: Neogastropoda
- Superfamily: Conoidea
- Family: Borsoniidae
- Genus: Austroturris; Laseron, 1954

Type species
- Filodrillia steira Hedley, 1922

= Austroturris =

Genus of gastropods

Austroturris is a genus of sea snails, marine gastropod mollusks in the family Borsoniidae.

== Species ==
Species within the genus Austroturris include:

- Austroturris steira (Hedley, 1922)
