= Gibberula simplex =

Scientific classification
- Kingdom: Animalia
- Phylum: Mollusca
- Class: Gastropoda
- Subclass: Caenogastropoda
- Order: Neogastropoda
- Family: Cystiscidae
- Subfamily: Cystiscinae
- Genus: Gibberula
- Species: G. simplex

Binomial name
- Gibberula simplex (Laseron, 1957)

Synonyms
- Phyloginella simplex Laseron, 1957

Species of gastropod

Gibberula simplex is a species of sea snail, a marine gastropod mollusk, in the family Cystiscidae.

This species was originally described as Phyloginella simplex by Laseron in 1957.
