= Volvarina rex =

Scientific classification
- Kingdom: Animalia
- Phylum: Mollusca
- Class: Gastropoda
- Subclass: Caenogastropoda
- Order: Neogastropoda
- Family: Marginellidae
- Genus: Volvarina
- Species: V. rex

Binomial name
- Volvarina rex (Laseron, 1957)

Synonyms
- Haloginella rex Laseron, 1957

Species of gastropod

Volvarina rex is a species of sea snail, a marine gastropod mollusk in the family Marginellidae, the margin snails.

== Description ==
The length of the shell attains 18 mm.

The shells are buff colored and have a shine to them. the shells darken the closer to the inside of the shell. the top of the shells have a distinct white curl towards the top. on the inside there are some ridges that go up the shell eventually evening out.

== Distribution ==
This marine species is endemic to Australia and occurs off Queensland, Northern Territory and Western Australia.
