= Volvarina tollere =

Scientific classification
- Kingdom: Animalia
- Phylum: Mollusca
- Class: Gastropoda
- Subclass: Caenogastropoda
- Order: Neogastropoda
- Family: Marginellidae
- Subfamily: Marginellinae
- Genus: Volvarina
- Species: V. tollere

Binomial name
- Volvarina tollere (Laseron, 1957)

Synonyms
- Dentimargo tollere (Laseron, 1957)· unaccepted; Longinella tollere Laseron, 1957

Species of gastropod

Volvarina tollere is a species of sea snail, a marine gastropod mollusk in the family Marginellidae, the margin snails.

== Distribution ==
This marine species is endemic to Australia and occurs off Queensland.
