= Volvarina haswelli =

Scientific classification
- Kingdom: Animalia
- Phylum: Mollusca
- Class: Gastropoda
- Subclass: Caenogastropoda
- Order: Neogastropoda
- Family: Marginellidae
- Subfamily: Marginellinae
- Genus: Volvarina
- Species: V. haswelli

Binomial name
- Volvarina haswelli (Laseron, 1948)

Synonyms
- Haloginella haswelli (Laseron, 1948); Marginella haswelli Laseron, 1948 (original combination)

Species of gastropod

Volvarina haswelli is a species of sea snail, a marine gastropod mollusk in the family Marginellidae, the margin snails.

== Description ==
The length of the shell attains 8 mm.

== Distribution ==
This marine species is endemic to Australia and occurs off New South Wales.
