= Filodrillia delicatula =

Scientific classification
- Kingdom: Animalia
- Phylum: Mollusca
- Class: Gastropoda
- Subclass: Caenogastropoda
- Order: Neogastropoda
- Superfamily: Conoidea
- Family: Borsoniidae
- Genus: Filodrillia
- Species: F. delicatula

Binomial name
- Filodrillia delicatula Laseron, 1954

Species of gastropod

Filodrillia delicatula is a species of sea snail, a marine gastropod mollusk in the family Borsoniidae.

== Distribution ==
This marine species is endemic to Australia and occurs off New South Wales.

== Bibliography ==
- Laseron, C. 1954. Revision of the New South Wales Turridae (Mollusca). Australian Zoological Handbook. Sydney : Royal Zoological Society of New South Wales 1-56, pls 1-12.
