= Filodrillia thornleyana =

Scientific classification
- Kingdom: Animalia
- Phylum: Mollusca
- Class: Gastropoda
- Subclass: Caenogastropoda
- Order: Neogastropoda
- Superfamily: Conoidea
- Family: Borsoniidae
- Genus: Filodrillia
- Species: F. thornleyana

Binomial name
- Filodrillia thornleyana Laseron, 1954

Species of gastropod

Filodrillia thornleyana is a species of sea snail, a marine gastropod mollusk in the family Borsoniidae.

== Distribution ==
This marine species is endemic to Australia and occurs off New South Wales, Tasmania and Victoria
