= Filodrillia crebrespirata =

Scientific classification
- Kingdom: Animalia
- Phylum: Mollusca
- Class: Gastropoda
- Subclass: Caenogastropoda
- Order: Neogastropoda
- Superfamily: Conoidea
- Family: Borsoniidae
- Genus: Filodrillia
- Species: F. crebrespirata

Binomial name
- Filodrillia crebrespirata (Verco, 1909)

Synonyms
- Drillia crebrespirata Verco, 1909 (original combination); Filodrillia lacteola var. crebrespirata (Verco, 1909)

Species of gastropod

Filodrillia crebrespirata is a species of sea snail, a marine gastropod mollusk in the family Borsoniidae.

== Description ==
The length of the shell attains 5.5 mm, its width 2.1 mm.

(Original description) This shell is more solid and opaque than Filodrillia lacteola. It has 15 spiral lirae in the penultimate whorl and 50 in the body whorl, crossed by crowded accremental striae.

== Distribution ==
This marine species is endemic to Australia and occurs off Southern Australia.
