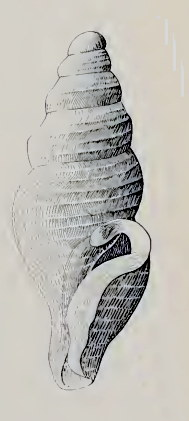
- Original image of a shell of Filodrillia haswelli

Scientific classification
- Kingdom: Animalia
- Phylum: Mollusca
- Class: Gastropoda
- Subclass: Caenogastropoda
- Order: Neogastropoda
- Superfamily: Conoidea
- Family: Borsoniidae
- Genus: Filodrillia
- Species: F. haswelli

Binomial name
- Filodrillia haswelli (Hedley, 1907)

Synonyms
- Drillia haswelli Hedley, 1907 (original combination)

= Filodrillia haswelli =

Species of gastropod

Filodrillia haswelli is a species of sea snail, a marine gastropod mollusk in the family Borsoniidae.

== Description ==
The length of the shell attains 5.5 mm, its width 1 mm.

(Original description) The small shell has a fusiform shape. It is blunt at each end, rather thin, scarcely opaque. It consists of 5½ whorls, the first two constituting a glassy dome-shaped protoconch, the rest are rather inflated, constricted at the sutures and excavate at the base. Its colour is chalk white, rather glossy when fresh. The sculpture shows fine spiral threads, one more prominent than the rest defines a slight angle on the shoulder. On the body whorl there are about four above and twenty below the angle. The spirals are crossed by arcuate growth lines. The aperture is slightly ascending, narrow above, rounded within a deep notch, fortified without by a heavy varix. A thin callus is spread on the inner lip. The siphonal canal is short and broad.

== Distribution ==
This marine species is endemic to Australia and occurs off New South Wales, Tasmania and Victoria.
