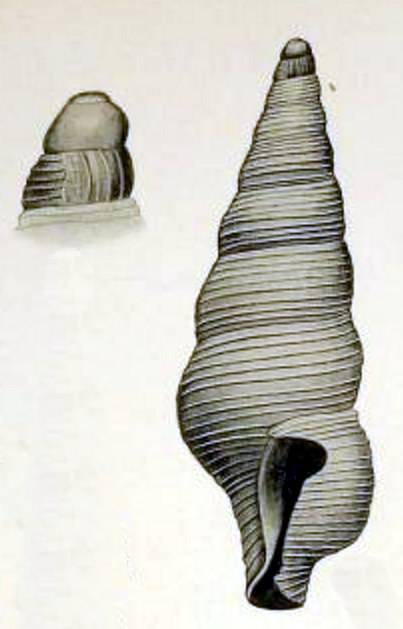
- Original image of a shell and its protoconch of Filodrillia trophonoides

Scientific classification
- Kingdom: Animalia
- Phylum: Mollusca
- Class: Gastropoda
- Subclass: Caenogastropoda
- Order: Neogastropoda
- Superfamily: Conoidea
- Family: Borsoniidae
- Genus: Filodrillia
- Species: F. trophonoides

Binomial name
- Filodrillia trophonoides (Verco, 1909)

Synonyms
- Drillia trophonoides Verco, 1909 (original combination)

= Filodrillia trophonoides =

Species of gastropod

Filodrillia trophonoides is a species of sea snail, a marine gastropod mollusk in the family Borsoniidae.

== Description ==
The length of the shell attains 14.4 mm, its width 5.2 mm.

(Original description) The solid shell is white, high, narrow, conical, with a blunt apex and a rounded base. It contains 9½ whorls, including a protoconch of 2½ convex whorls, the first two smooth, the rest faintly subdistantly axially plicate, ending abruptly. The whorls of the spire are convex. The sutures are distinct and subcanaliculate. The body whorl is short and roundly contracted at the base. The aperture is roundly oval, widest behind, roundly contracted in front, and constricted at its junction with the canal. The outer lip is sharp, simple, scarcely inflected, convexly retreating from the suture to form a semi-circular sinus, then convexly antecurrent to a very slight anterior sinus at the constricted neck of the siphonal canal. The inner lip has a thin, complete glaze. The base of the shell is roundly concave. The columella is straight, curved to the left in the siphonal canal, and slightly thickened on the outside of its anterior end. The narrow spiral cords, one-third as wide as their interspaces, increase from four in the first whorl to nine in the penultimate whorl, and twenty-three in the body whorl, and are minutely roughened by sublenticular accremental striae.

== Distribution ==
This marine species is endemic to Australia and occurs off South Australia.
