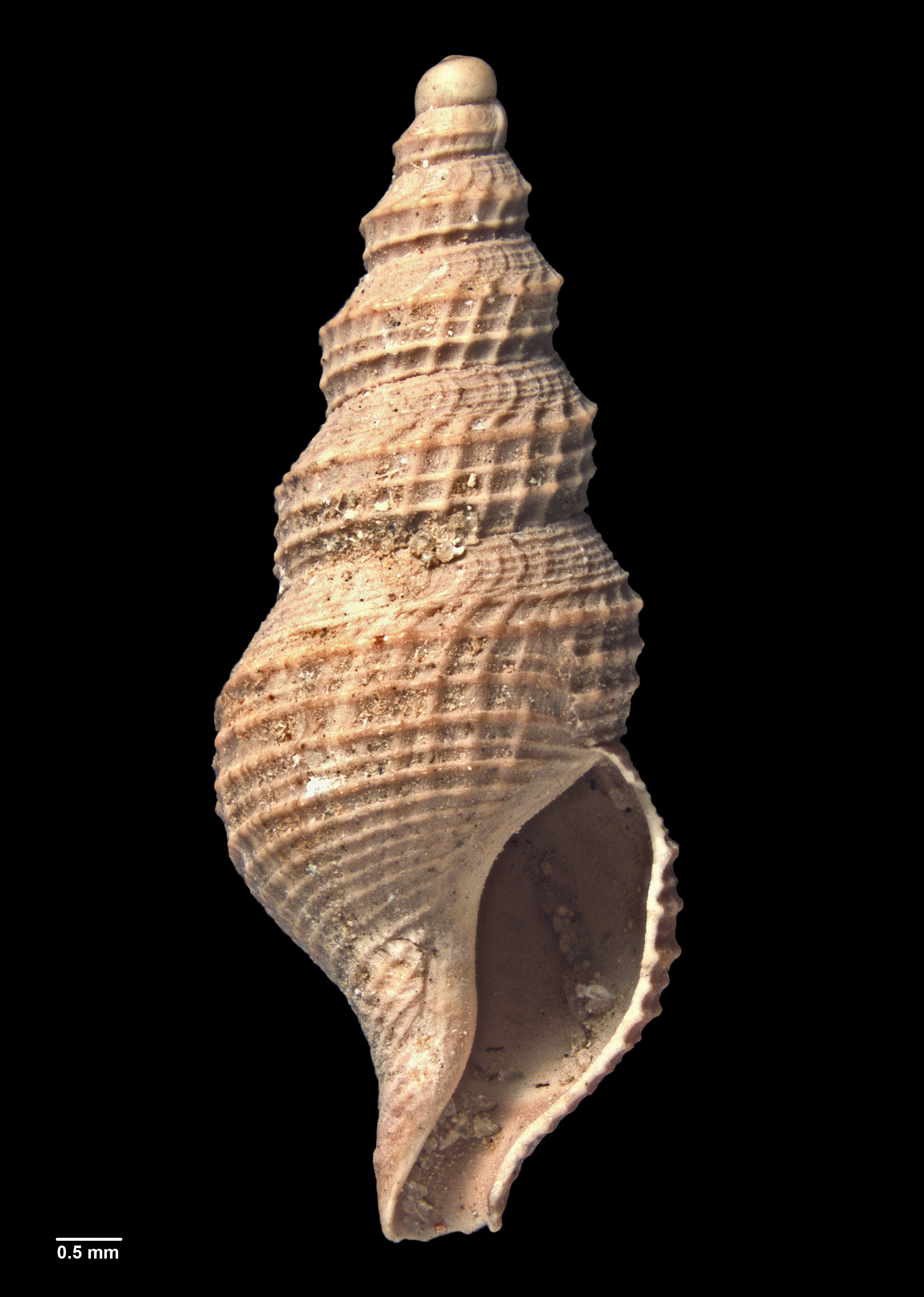
- Holotype from Auckland War Memorial Museum

Scientific classification
- Kingdom: Animalia
- Phylum: Mollusca
- Class: Gastropoda
- Subclass: Caenogastropoda
- Order: Neogastropoda
- Family: Borsoniidae
- Genus: Filodrillia
- Species: †F. ludbrookae

Binomial name
- †Filodrillia ludbrookae A. W. B. Powell, 1944

= Filodrillia ludbrookae =

Filodrillia ludbrookae Temporal range: middle Miocene

Extinct species of gastropod

Filodrillia ludbrookae is an extinct species of sea snail, a marine gastropod mollusc, in the family Borsoniidae. Fossils of the species date to middle Miocene strata of the St Vincent Basin of South Australia.

== Description ==
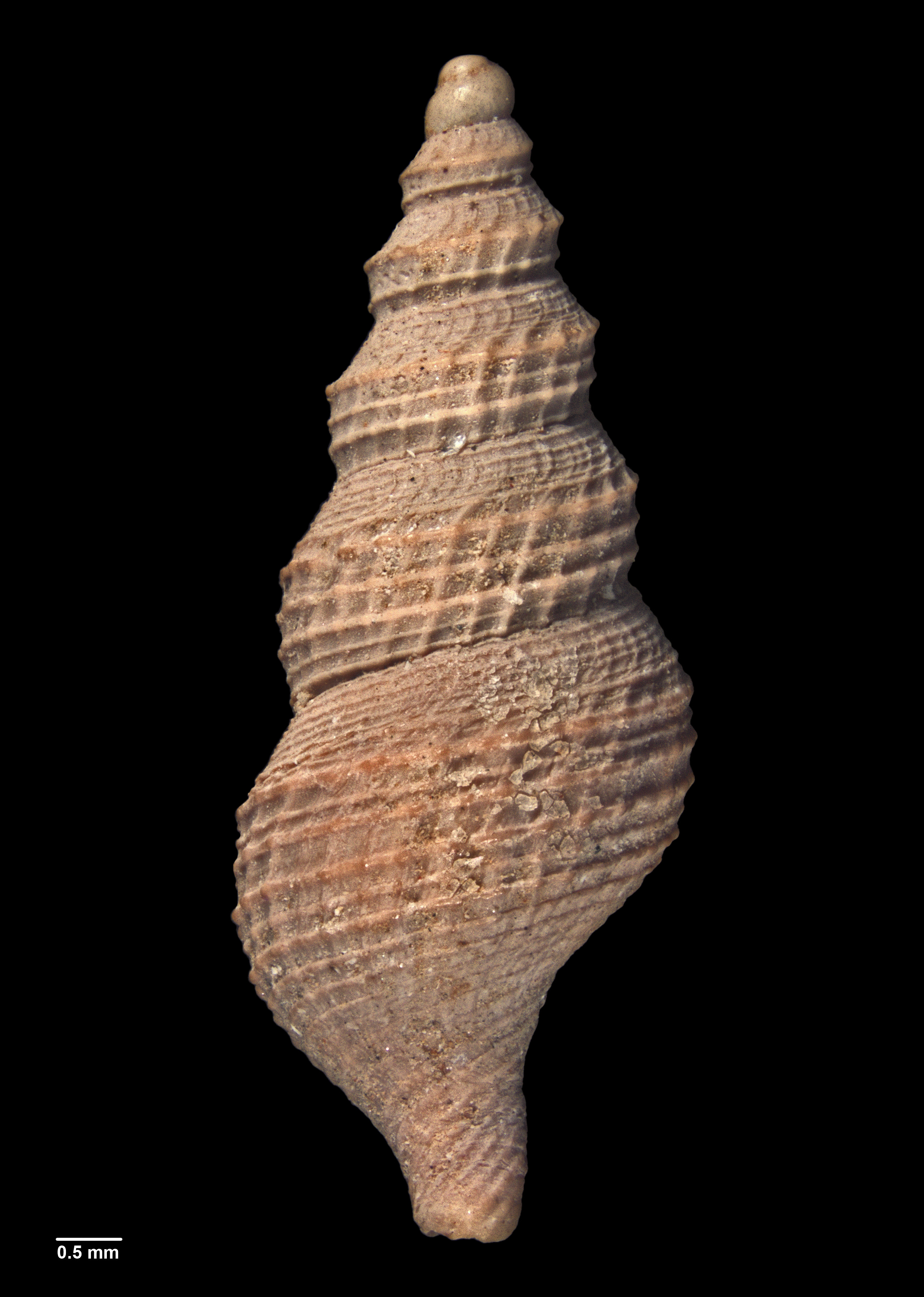
Reverse view of holotype

In the original description, Powell described the species as follows:

Body-whorl more rounded than in above species; the early whorls only are strongly angulate. Axials much weaker than spirals—numerous spiral threads on shoulder. Whorls 6 1/2, including typical papillate smooth protoconch of 1 3/4 whorls. Peripheral spiral narrow, at middle of whorls; three spirals of equal strength below it, lowest at lower suture; about 16 much weaker spirals on base and neck. Axials very narrow, weak, oblique and flexuous, strongest from peripheral keel to lower suture, but extending weakly both over shoulder and over base to neck, The shoulder bears six fine crisp spiral threads.

The holotype of the species measures 9 mm (0.35 in) in height and has a diameter of 3.75 mm (0.148 in). It is similar in appearance to F. peramoena, but more slender. The species can be distinguished from other members of the genus due to the persistent angulate periphery on the body whorl, being relatively more slender, and the body whorl being less rounded.

== Taxonomy ==
The species was first described by A. W. B. Powell in 1944. The holotype was collected in 1919 by W. Howchin and J.C. Verco from the Metropolitan Abattoirs Bore in Adelaide, at a depth of between 122–152 m (400–499 ft). It is held by the Auckland War Memorial Museum.

== Distribution ==
This extinct marine species occurs in middle Miocene strata of the St Vincent Basin of South Australia, including the Dry Creek Sands.
