= Filodrillia dolorosa =

Scientific classification
- Kingdom: Animalia
- Phylum: Mollusca
- Class: Gastropoda
- Subclass: Caenogastropoda
- Order: Neogastropoda
- Superfamily: Conoidea
- Family: Borsoniidae
- Genus: Filodrillia
- Species: F. dolorosa

Binomial name
- Filodrillia dolorosa (Thiele, 1925)

Synonyms
- Drillia dolorosa Thiele, 1925 (original combination)

Species of gastropod

Filodrillia dolorosa is a species of sea snail, a marine gastropod mollusk in the family Borsoniidae.

== Distribution ==
This marine species has been found in the demersal zone of the Southeast Atlantic Ocean on the Agulhas Bank, South Africa
