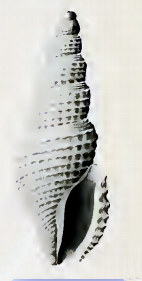
- Original image of a shell of Filodrillia ornata

Scientific classification
- Kingdom: Animalia
- Phylum: Mollusca
- Class: Gastropoda
- Subclass: Caenogastropoda
- Order: Neogastropoda
- Superfamily: Conoidea
- Family: Borsoniidae
- Genus: Filodrillia
- Species: F. ornata

Binomial name
- Filodrillia ornata Hedley, 1922

= Filodrillia ornata =

Species of gastropod

Filodrillia ornata is a species of sea snail, a marine gastropod mollusk in the family Borsoniidae.

== Description ==
The length of the shell attains 7.5 mm, its width 3.0 mm.

(Original description) The small shell is rather solid, turreted and has a subcylindrical shape. Its colour is uniform buff. The six whorls are rounded, inclusive of the bulbous protoconch.

Sculpture:— The flattened and conspicuous fasciole carries three or four small spiral threads. The remaining spirals are sharp cords, narrower than their interspaces, larger and wider apart on the periphery, about fifteen on the body whorl and five on the penultimate. The radial riblets, so faint as to scarcely appear in the intercostal furrows, form beads on these spirals. These riblets are most developed on the fourth and fifth whorls, and vanish gradually on the body whorl. The aperture is open. The sinus is wide and deep. The inner lip has a thin callus. The siphonal canal is short and broad.

== Distribution ==
This marine species is endemic to Australia and occurs off Tasmania.
