= Horologica barrieria =

Scientific classification
- Domain: Eukaryota
- Kingdom: Animalia
- Phylum: Mollusca
- Class: Gastropoda
- Subclass: Caenogastropoda
- Clade: Hypsogastropoda
- Family: Cerithiopsidae
- Genus: Horologica
- Species: H. barrieria

Binomial name
- Horologica barrieria Nützel, 1998

Species of gastropod

Horologica barrieria is a species of sea snail, a gastropod in the family Cerithiopsidae. It was described by Nützel, in 1998.
