= Filodrillia dulcis =

Scientific classification
- Kingdom: Animalia
- Phylum: Mollusca
- Class: Gastropoda
- Subclass: Caenogastropoda
- Order: Neogastropoda
- Superfamily: Conoidea
- Family: Borsoniidae
- Genus: Filodrillia
- Species: F. dulcis

Binomial name
- Filodrillia dulcis (Sowerby III, 1896)

Synonyms
- Daphnella dulcis G. B. Sowerby III, 1896 (original combination); Drillia dulcis Verco, 1909

Species of gastropod

Filodrillia dulcis is a species of sea snail, a marine gastropod mollusk in the family Borsoniidae.

== Distribution ==
This marine species is endemic to Australia and occurs off South Australia and Tasmania.
