= Horologica glaubrechti =

Scientific classification
- Kingdom: Animalia
- Phylum: Mollusca
- Class: Gastropoda
- Subclass: Caenogastropoda
- Order: incertae sedis
- Family: Cerithiopsidae
- Genus: Horologica
- Species: H. glaubrechti

Binomial name
- Horologica glaubrechti Jay & Drivas, 2002

Species of gastropod

Horologica glaubrechti is a species of sea snail, a gastropod in the family Cerithiopsidae. It was described by Jay and Drivas, in 2002.
