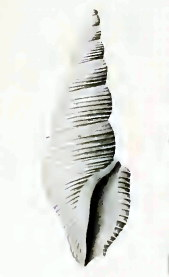
- Original image of a shell of Filodrillia columnaria

Scientific classification
- Kingdom: Animalia
- Phylum: Mollusca
- Class: Gastropoda
- Subclass: Caenogastropoda
- Order: Neogastropoda
- Superfamily: Conoidea
- Family: Borsoniidae
- Genus: Filodrillia
- Species: F. columnaria

Binomial name
- Filodrillia columnaria Hedley, 1922

= Filodrillia columnaria =

Species of gastropod

Filodrillia columnaria is a species of sea snail, a marine gastropod mollusk in the family Borsoniidae.

== Description ==
(Original description) The shell has a slender elongate-fusiform shape. Its colour is buff, with a pale peripheral zone underlined by an orange band. It contains seven and a half whorls, of which two constitute the protoconch, angled at the shoulder, flattened above and rounded beneath, excavate at the base.

The sculpture :—No radials occur. The fasciole area is traversed by three or four fine close threads. The rest of the shell carries stronger cords, uniform in size and evenly spaced. Of these there are seven on the penultimate and twenty-two on the body whorl. The aperture is open, right insertion ascending above the plane of the suture. A slight varix can be seen behind the aperture. The outer edge of the expanded lip is denticulate by the spiral sculpture. The inner lip shows a thin sheet of callus. The sinus is deep, spout shaped. The siphonal canal is short and open.

== Distribution ==
This marine species is endemic to Australia and occurs off Tasmania.
