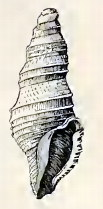
- Drawing of a shell of Filodrillia tricarinata

Scientific classification
- Kingdom: Animalia
- Phylum: Mollusca
- Class: Gastropoda
- Subclass: Caenogastropoda
- Order: Neogastropoda
- Superfamily: Conoidea
- Family: Borsoniidae
- Genus: Filodrillia
- Species: F. tricarinata

Binomial name
- Filodrillia tricarinata (Tenison-Woods, 1878)

Synonyms
- Drillia tricarinata Tenison-Woods, 1878 (original combination)

= Filodrillia tricarinata =

Species of gastropod

Filodrillia tricarinata is a species of sea snail, a marine gastropod mollusk in the family Borsoniidae.

== Description ==
(Original description) The length of the shell attains 6 mm, its width 2 mm. The small shell has an elongate fusiform shape and contains six convex whorls, including the 1½ whorls of the obtuse nucleus. This is a banded shell without plaits, which is unusual in the genus, but it has three delicate keels, one of which is on the suture, and the spaces between are shallow concave grooves. The aperture is ovate. The sinus is entirely posterior, is wide and deep, and the outer lip is thickened.

(Description by Verco, 1909) This shell varies much in shape and sculpture. There may be three sharp spirals on each of the four spire-whorls in a shell 8 mm. long, or two on the first and second spire-whorls, an intercalated third thread on the third whorl, and three on the fourth whorl. The shell may be shorter and more solid, with two very strong spirals on all the spire-whorls, and a weak intercalated thread on the fourth, with about twenty obsolete axial lirae on the second and third whorls, much less marked on the fourth. It may be short and wide, with only two spirals in the spire-whorls, but in the first and second, or first, second, and third whorls oblique axial lirae almost as valid as the spirals may cross and tuberculate these, and fade out in the later whorls. It may be a long narrow shell, only 2.5 mm. broad, with four spirals in each whorl, and with 16 oblique axial lirae like those in the previous form; or it may be a shell of 10 mm. by 3.5 mm., with two spirals in the first two whorls, three in the second two, and four in the fifth whorls, with oblique narrow axial costae, 17 in the penultimate, as valid as the spirals, tuberculating the intersections, and mildly coronating the uppermost spiral. Several of these might be regarded as distinct species did not intermediate forms reveal a complete gradation between them.

== Distribution ==
This marine species is endemic to Australia and occurs off South Australia, New South Wales, Tasmania and Victoria.
