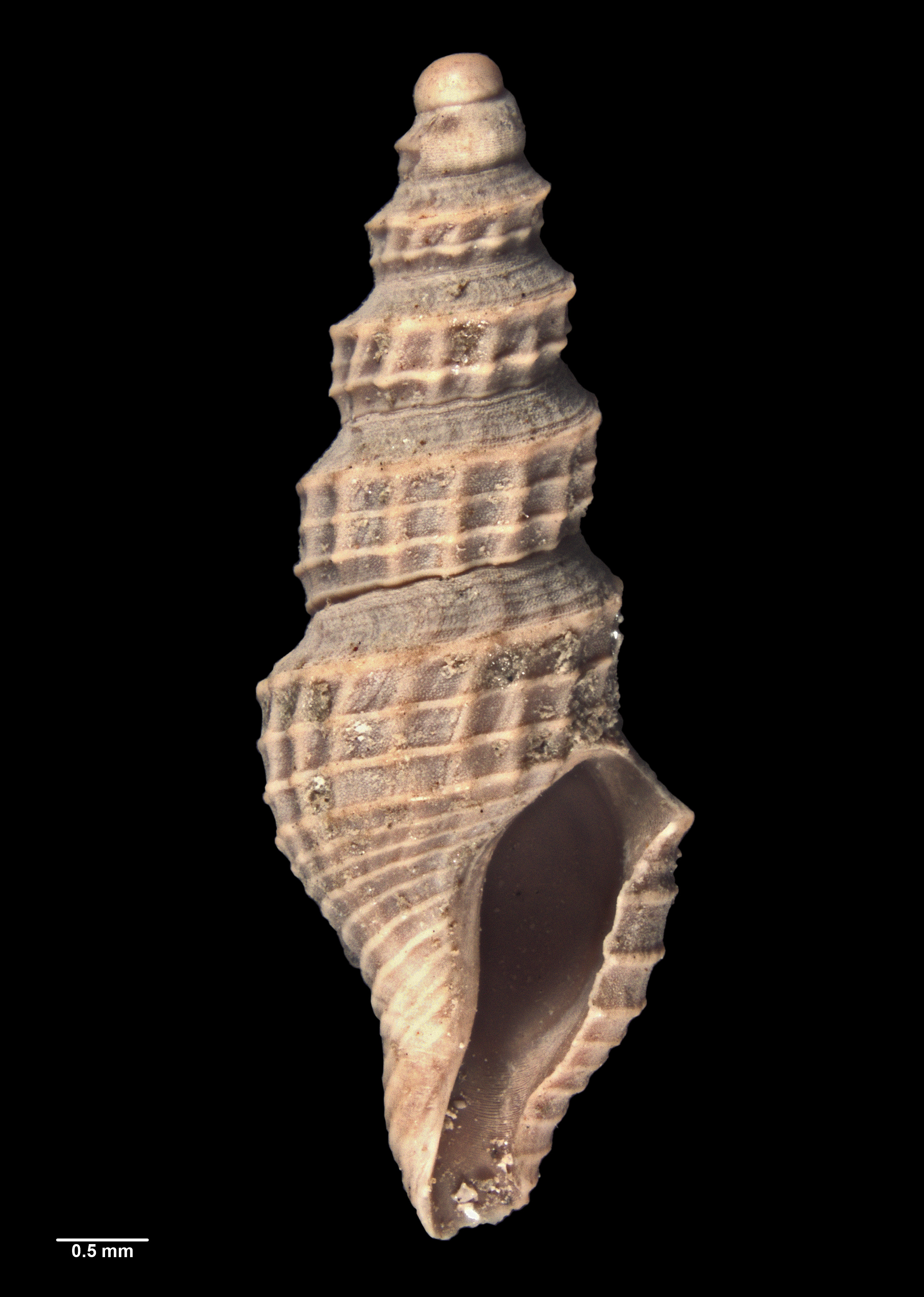
- Holotype from Auckland War Memorial Museum

Scientific classification
- Kingdom: Animalia
- Phylum: Mollusca
- Class: Gastropoda
- Subclass: Caenogastropoda
- Order: Neogastropoda
- Family: Borsoniidae
- Genus: Filodrillia
- Species: †F. turricula

Binomial name
- †Filodrillia turricula A. W. B. Powell, 1944

= Filodrillia turricula =

Filodrillia turricula Temporal range: middle Miocene

Extinct species of gastropod

Filodrillia turricula is an extinct species of sea snail, a marine gastropod mollusc, in the family Borsoniidae. Fossils of the species date to middle Miocene strata of the Port Phillip Basin of Victoria, Australia.

== Description ==
In the original description, Powell described the species as follows:

Shell slender, with sharply angled periphery, situated above middle; outline of whorls lightly concave on shoulder, straight and almost vertical below. Whorls 6 1/2, including papillate smooth protoconch of 1 3/4 whorls ending in a few brephic axials. Peripheral spiral narrow; three slightly narrower sharply raised spirals below it, lowest at lower suture, and a further 12 spirals on base and neck; those on neck closely spaced; those on base with interspaces 1 to 1 1/2 times width of spirals. Axials slender, slightly oblique, stopped at peripheral keel and extending weakly over the base, 15 on penultimate. The shoulder bears four very delicate spiral threads. Posterior sinus deep, rounded, subtubular. Outer lip arcuately projecting as a hollow varix.

The holotype of the species measures 6.5 mm (0.26 in) in height and has a diameter of 2.4 mm (0.094 in).

== Taxonomy ==
The species was first described by A. W. B. Powell in 1944. The holotype was collected at an unknown date prior to 1944 from Fossil Beach, Balcombe Bay / Jullul Bay, Victoria, Australia, and is held by the Auckland War Memorial Museum.

== Distribution ==
This extinct marine species occurs in middle Miocene strata of the Port Phillip Basin of Victoria, Australia, including the Gellibrand Formation.

== Gallery ==
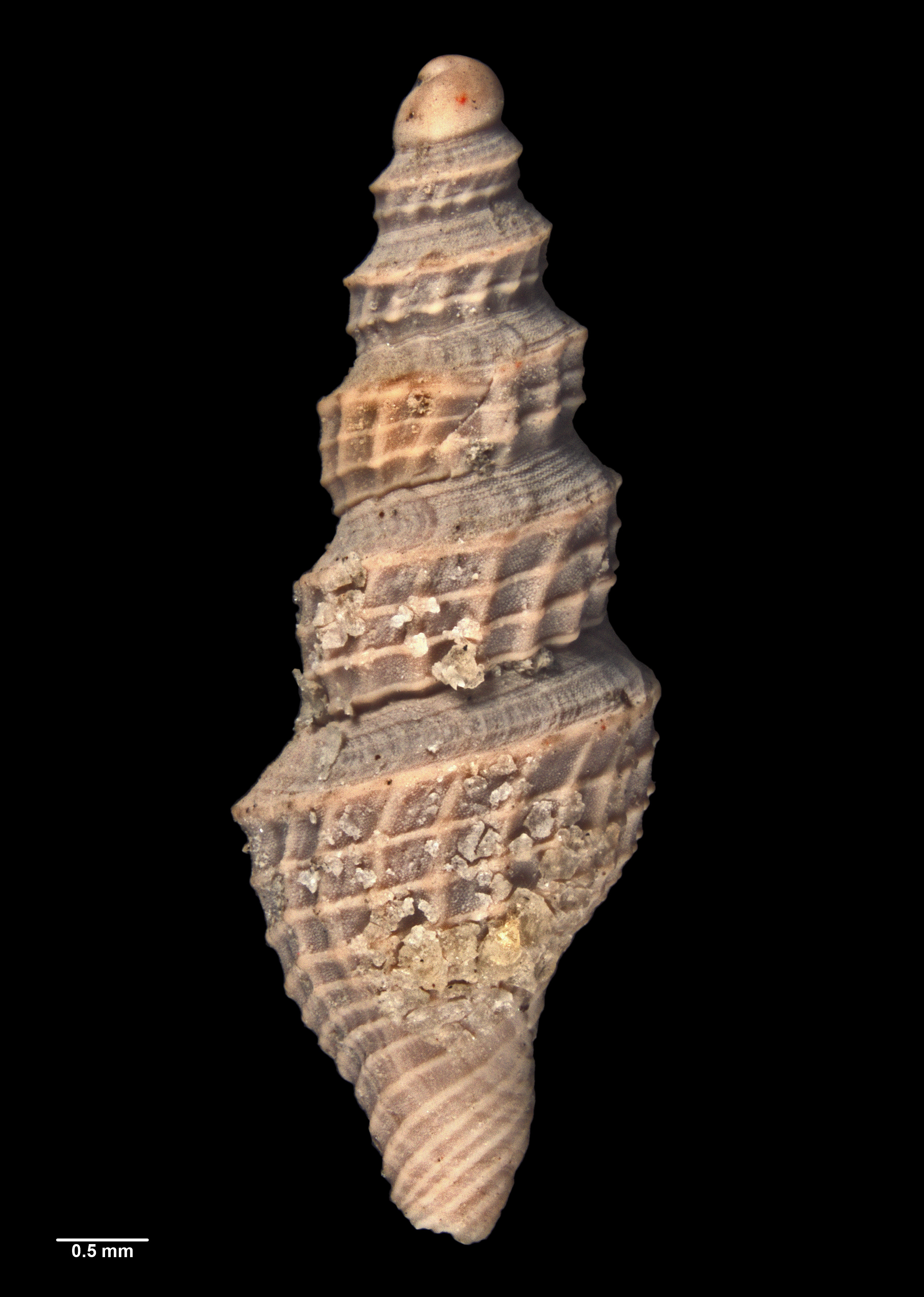
Reverse view of holotype

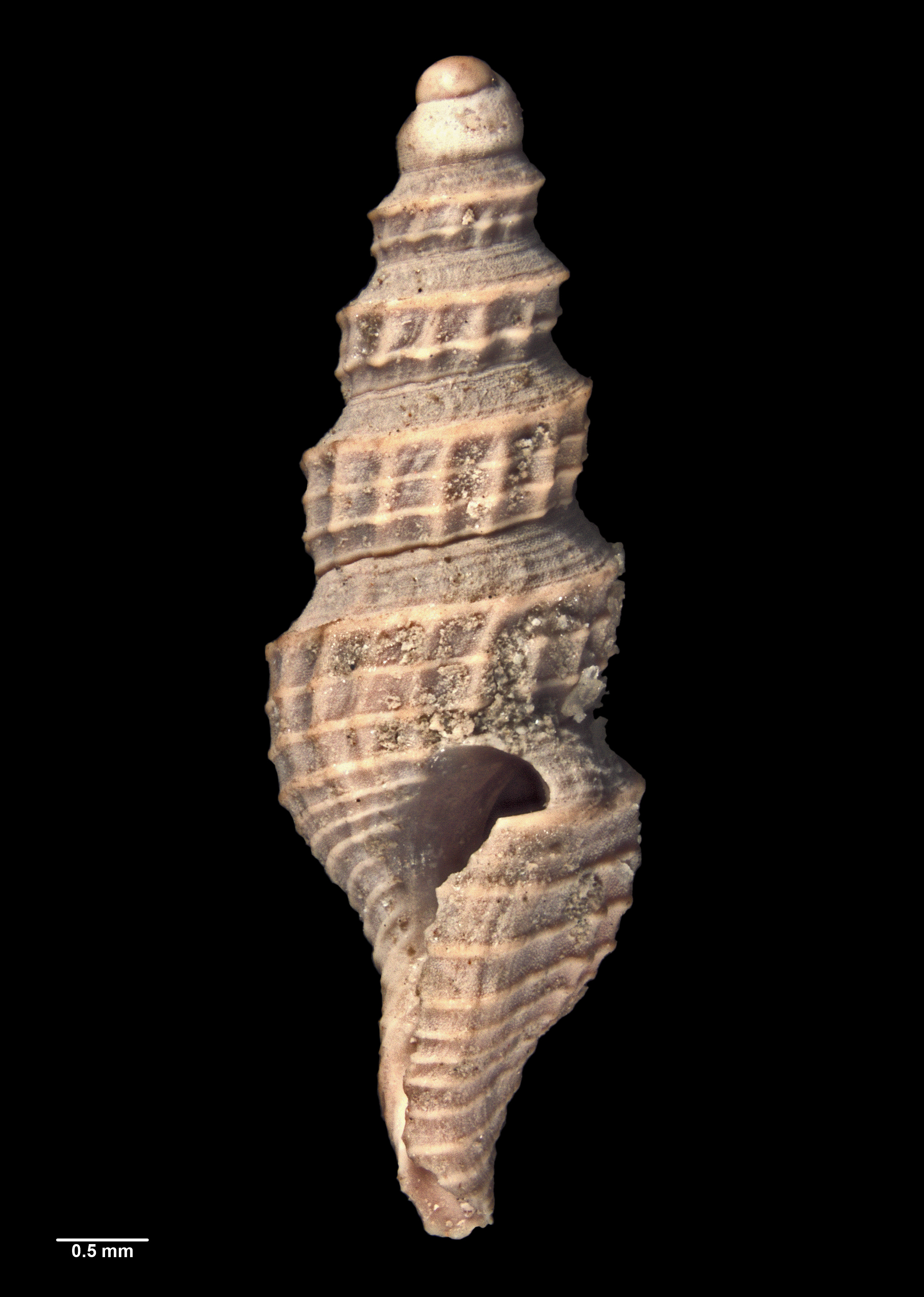
Side view of holotype
