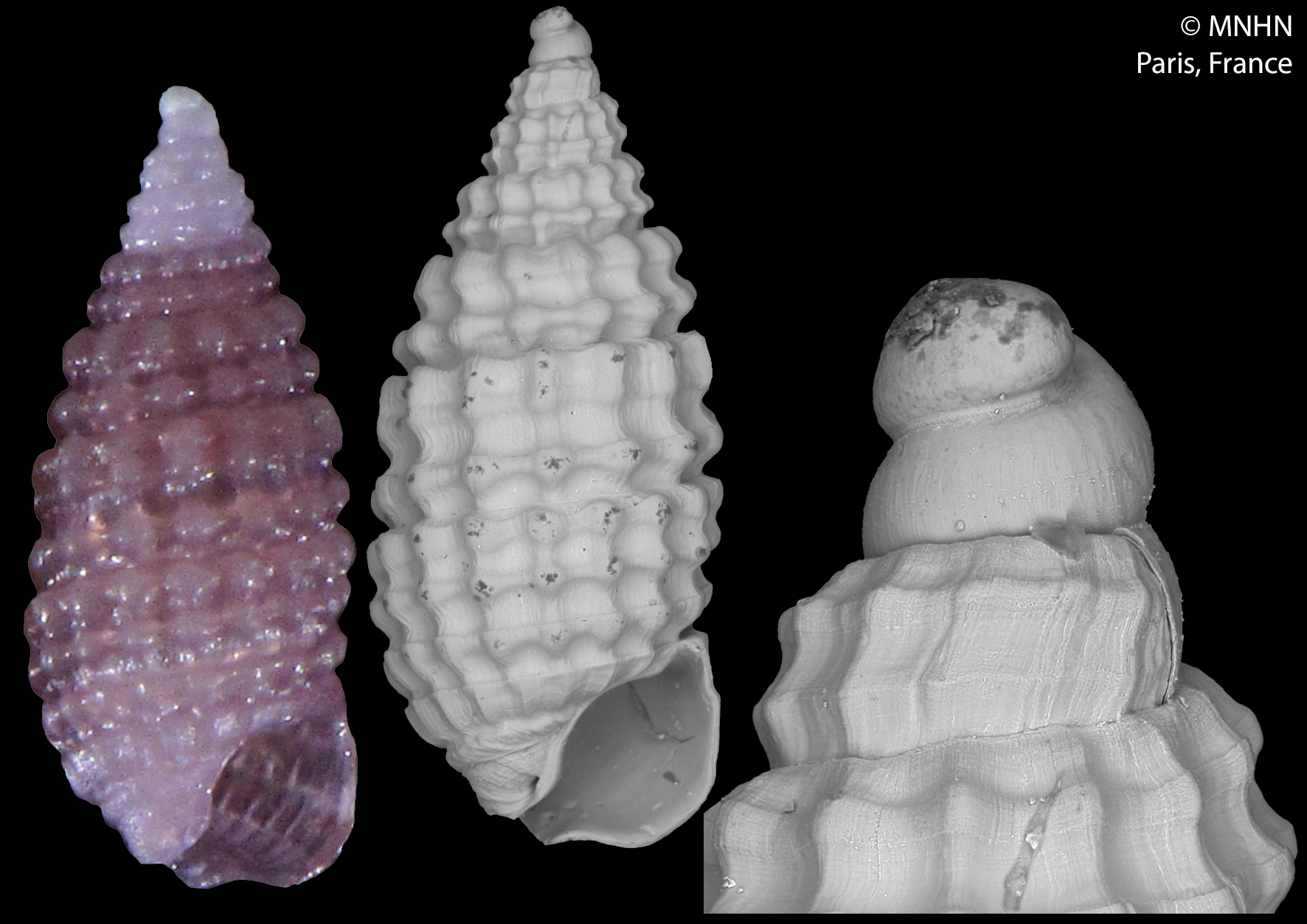

Scientific classification
- Domain: Eukaryota
- Kingdom: Animalia
- Phylum: Mollusca
- Class: Gastropoda
- Subclass: Caenogastropoda
- Clade: Hypsogastropoda
- Family: Cerithiopsidae
- Genus: Horologica
- Species: H. lizardensis

Binomial name
- Horologica lizardensis Nützel, 1998

= Horologica lizardensis =

Species of gastropod

Horologica lizardensis is a species of sea snail, a gastropod in the family Cerithiopsidae,.

It was described by Nützel, in 1998.

== Distribution ==
This marine species occurs off Papua New Guinea.
