= Horologica turrigera =

Scientific classification
- Kingdom: Animalia
- Phylum: Mollusca
- Class: Gastropoda
- Subclass: Caenogastropoda
- Order: incertae sedis
- Family: Cerithiopsidae
- Genus: Horologica
- Species: H. turrigera

Binomial name
- Horologica turrigera (Watson, 1886)

Synonyms
- Cerithiopsis turrigera Watson, 1886 (original combination); Joculator turriger (Watson, 1886); Joculator turrigera (Watson, 1886)

Species of gastropod

Horologica turrigera is a species of small sea snail, a marine gastropod mollusc in the family Cerithiopsidae. The species was described by Watson in 1886.
