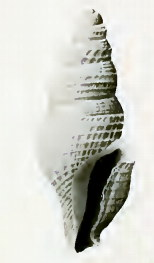
- Original image of a shell of Filodrillia stadialis

Scientific classification
- Kingdom: Animalia
- Phylum: Mollusca
- Class: Gastropoda
- Subclass: Caenogastropoda
- Order: Neogastropoda
- Superfamily: Conoidea
- Family: Borsoniidae
- Genus: Filodrillia
- Species: F. stadialis

Binomial name
- Filodrillia stadialis Hedley, 1922

= Filodrillia stadialis =

Species of gastropod

Filodrillia stadialis is a species of sea snail, a marine gastropod mollusk in the family Borsoniidae.

== Description ==
The length of the shell attains 6.5 mm, its width 3.0 mm.

(Original description) The small shell is turreted and has an ovate-fusiform shape. Its colour dull is white, the glassy opaque protoconch contrasts with the dull texture of the rest of the shell. The shell contains six whorls, inclusive of a two-whorled protoconch, rather inflated, sharply angled at the shoulder.

The sculpture consists of five fine close threads traverse the fasciole area. Below the shoulder angle thirteen spaced cords become progressively smaller and closer towards the end of the shell, four of these ascending to the penultimate and two to the uppermost whorl. The faint curved radial dashes start below the shoulder angle and vanish on the base. The aperture is open, without varix. The sinus is broad and dee. The siphonal canal is short and open.

== Distribution ==
This marine species is endemic to Australia and occurs off New South Wales.
