= Horologica semipicta =

Scientific classification
- Kingdom: Animalia
- Phylum: Mollusca
- Class: Gastropoda
- Subclass: Caenogastropoda
- Order: incertae sedis
- Family: Cerithiopsidae
- Genus: Horologica
- Species: H. semipicta

Binomial name
- Horologica semipicta (Gould, 1861)

Synonyms
- Cerithiopsis semipicta Gould, 1861 (original combination); Joculator semipicta (Gould, 1861); Joculator semipictus (Gould, 1861)

Species of gastropod

Horologica semipicta is a species of small sea snail, a marine gastropod mollusc in the family Cerithiopsidae.

The species was described by Gould in 1861.
