= Filodrillia aikeni =

Scientific classification
- Kingdom: Animalia
- Phylum: Mollusca
- Class: Gastropoda
- Subclass: Caenogastropoda
- Order: Neogastropoda
- Superfamily: Conoidea
- Family: Borsoniidae
- Genus: Filodrillia
- Species: F. aikeni

Binomial name
- Filodrillia aikeni Stahlschmidt, 2015

Species of gastropod

Filodrillia aikeni is a species of sea snails, a marine gastropod mollusc in the family Borsoniidae.

== Distribution ==
This marine species occurs off the Eastern Cape, South Africa
