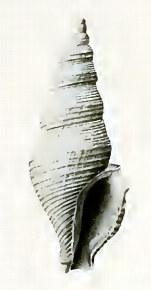
- Original image of a shell of Filodrillia mucronata

Scientific classification
- Kingdom: Animalia
- Phylum: Mollusca
- Class: Gastropoda
- Subclass: Caenogastropoda
- Order: Neogastropoda
- Superfamily: Conoidea
- Family: Borsoniidae
- Genus: Filodrillia
- Species: F. mucronata

Binomial name
- Filodrillia mucronata Hedley, 1922

= Filodrillia mucronata =

Species of gastropod

Filodrillia mucronata is a species of sea snail, a marine gastropod mollusk in the family Borsoniidae.

== Description ==
The length of the shell attains 9.5 mm, its width 3.5 mm. (Original description) The elongate shell has a fusiform shape. Its colour is uniform ivory-yellow. It contains seven whorls, of which two compose the protoconch.

Sculpture:—The radial sculpture is absent. On the shoulder a sharp angle is defined by a prominent cord, above which six fine and closely packed threads occupy the fasciole area. Below this the cords as they descend become smaller and closer, those in the hollow of the base being the most crowded. There are twenty-two such cords on the body whorl, and three or four on the upper whorls. The right insertion of the aperture :mounts slightly above the plane of the suture. The sinus shows a large U-shaped spout, below which is an incipient varix. Beyond the latter the free limb of the outer lip bends inwards. Within this lip are sometimes a few entering plications. The inner lip shows a sheet of callus, thin above, but with a thickened margin below. The siphonal canal is short, expanding, and open.

== Distribution ==
This marine species is endemic to Australia and occurs off New South Wales.
