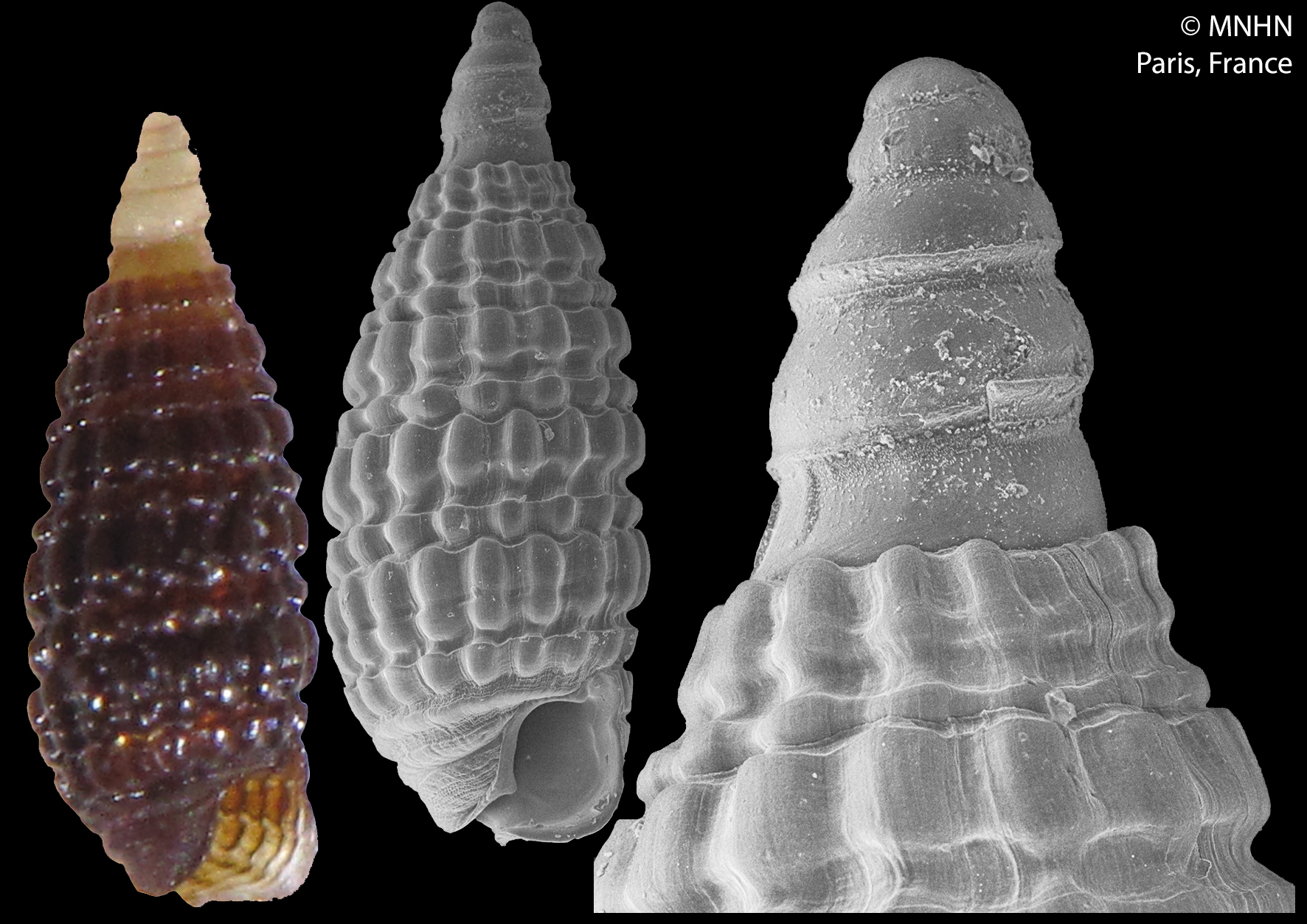
- Shell of Horologica anisocorda (specimen at MNHN, Paris)

Scientific classification
- Kingdom: Animalia
- Phylum: Mollusca
- Class: Gastropoda
- Subclass: Caenogastropoda
- Order: incertae sedis
- Family: Cerithiopsidae
- Genus: Horologica
- Species: H. anisocorda

Binomial name
- Horologica anisocorda Jay & Drivas, 2002

= Horologica anisocorda =

Species of gastropod

Horologica anisocorda is a species of sea snail, a gastropod in the family Cerithiopsidae. It was described by Jay and Drivas, in 2002.

== Distribution ==
This marine species occurs off Papua New Guinea.
