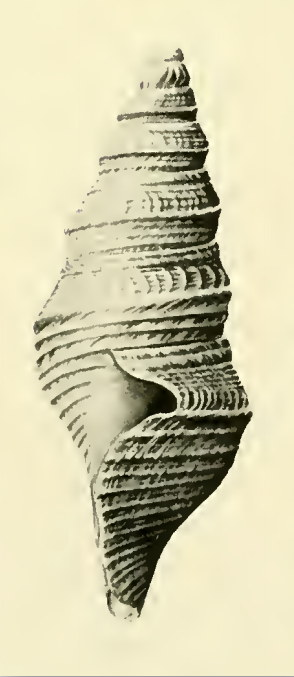
- Original image of a shell of Austroturris steira

Scientific classification
- Kingdom: Animalia
- Phylum: Mollusca
- Class: Gastropoda
- Subclass: Caenogastropoda
- Order: Neogastropoda
- Superfamily: Conoidea
- Family: Borsoniidae
- Genus: Austroturris
- Species: A. steira

Binomial name
- Austroturris steira (Hedley, 1922)

Synonyms
- Filodrillia steira Hedley, 1922 (original combination)

= Austroturris steira =

Species of gastropod

Austroturris steira is a species of sea snail, a marine gastropod mollusk in the family Borsoniidae.

== Description ==
The length of the shell attains 8 mm, its breadth 3.5 mm. (Original description) The small shell is solid and biconical. Its colour is uniform pale buff. The suture is channelled. It has seven whorls of which two constitute the protoconch.

Sculpture :—The dominant feature is a prominent peripheral keel revolving round all the whorls. The summit of each whorl is crowned by a double thread. Along the fasciole area run four slender threads. Between the keel and the anterior end of the shell occur about twenty cords, diminishing progressively as they recede from the periphery. Numerous crescentic threads cross the excavate fasciole. Fine radial lines also appear in the interstices of the basal spirals.

Aperture :—The sinus is wide and deep, the canal short and open, a thin film of callus on the upper lip.

== Distribution ==
This marine species is endemic to Australia and occurs off New South Wales
