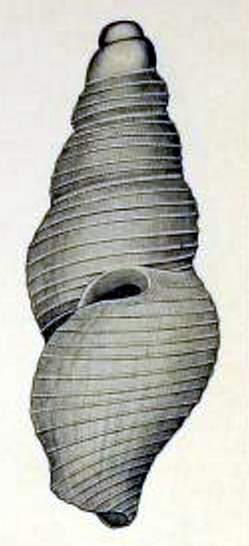
- Original image of a shell of Filodrillia lacteola

Scientific classification
- Kingdom: Animalia
- Phylum: Mollusca
- Class: Gastropoda
- Subclass: Caenogastropoda
- Order: Neogastropoda
- Superfamily: Conoidea
- Family: Borsoniidae
- Genus: Filodrillia
- Species: F. lacteola

Binomial name
- Filodrillia lacteola (Verco, 1909)

Synonyms
- Drillia lacteola Verco, 1909 (original combination)

= Filodrillia lacteola =

Species of gastropod

Filodrillia lacteola is a species of sea snail, a marine gastropod mollusk in the family Borsoniidae.

== Description ==
The length of the shell attains 4.8 mm, its width 2.1 mm.

(Original description) The thin shell is translucent-white. It contains 6 whorls, including the protoconch of 2 smooth convex whorls. The whorls on the spire are convex. The suture is simple, narrowly margined. The body whorl is roundly contracted at the base. The aperture is elongate-oval, opening widely into a short siphonal canal. The outer lip is simple, thin, crenulated outside; with a deep rounded posterior sinus near the suture, having a thickened and slightly erect edge, with a shallow excavation anteriorly where it is pinched to form the canal. The inner lip is complete, applied, glazed, thin, thickened at the back to meet the margin of the sinus. The columella is nearly straight. The thin spirals number seven in the penultimate whorl and twenty in the body whorl. Faint accremental striae minutely roughen the sculpture.

== Distribution ==
This marine species is endemic to Australia and occurs off South Australia, Tasmania and Victoria.
