= Charles Francis Laseron =

Australian malacologist (1887–1959)

Charles Francis Laserson
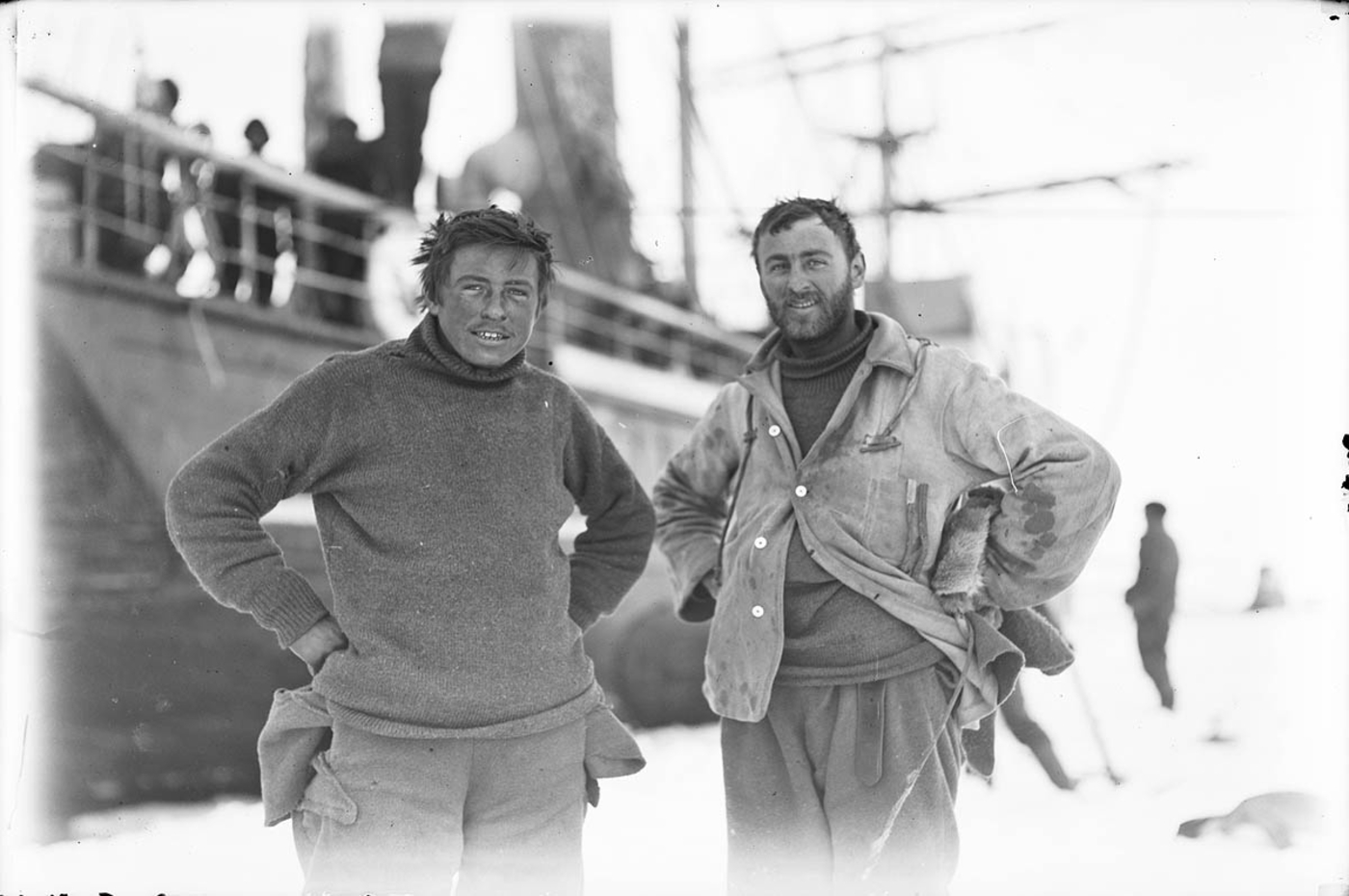
- Laseron (right) with Percy Correll, another member of the Australasian Antarctic Expedition
- Born: 6 December 1887; Manitowoc, Wisconsin, United States
- Died: 27 June 1959 (aged 71); Concord, New South Wales, Australia
- Known for: part of the Australasian Antarctic Expedition

Charles Francis Laseron (6 December 1887 – 27 June 1959) was an American-born Australian naturalist and malacologist.

== Early life and education ==
Laseron was born on 6 December 1887 at Manitowoc, Wisconsin, United States of America, to English parents the Reverend David Laseron, and his wife Frances, née Bradley. After relocating temporarily to London in 1888, the family migrated to Australia in January 1891. In 1892 his father was accidentally shot, causing lasting health problems for Rev. Laseron who resigned his post in Sydney three years later and then moved his family to Lithgow, New South Wales where he was given charge of the parish.

Charles attended St Andrew's Cathedral School as scholar and chorister and later studied at Sydney Technical College where he was awarded the diploma in geology. He was employed by the Technological Museum in July 1906 and published a series of papers.

== Australian Antarctic Expedition ==
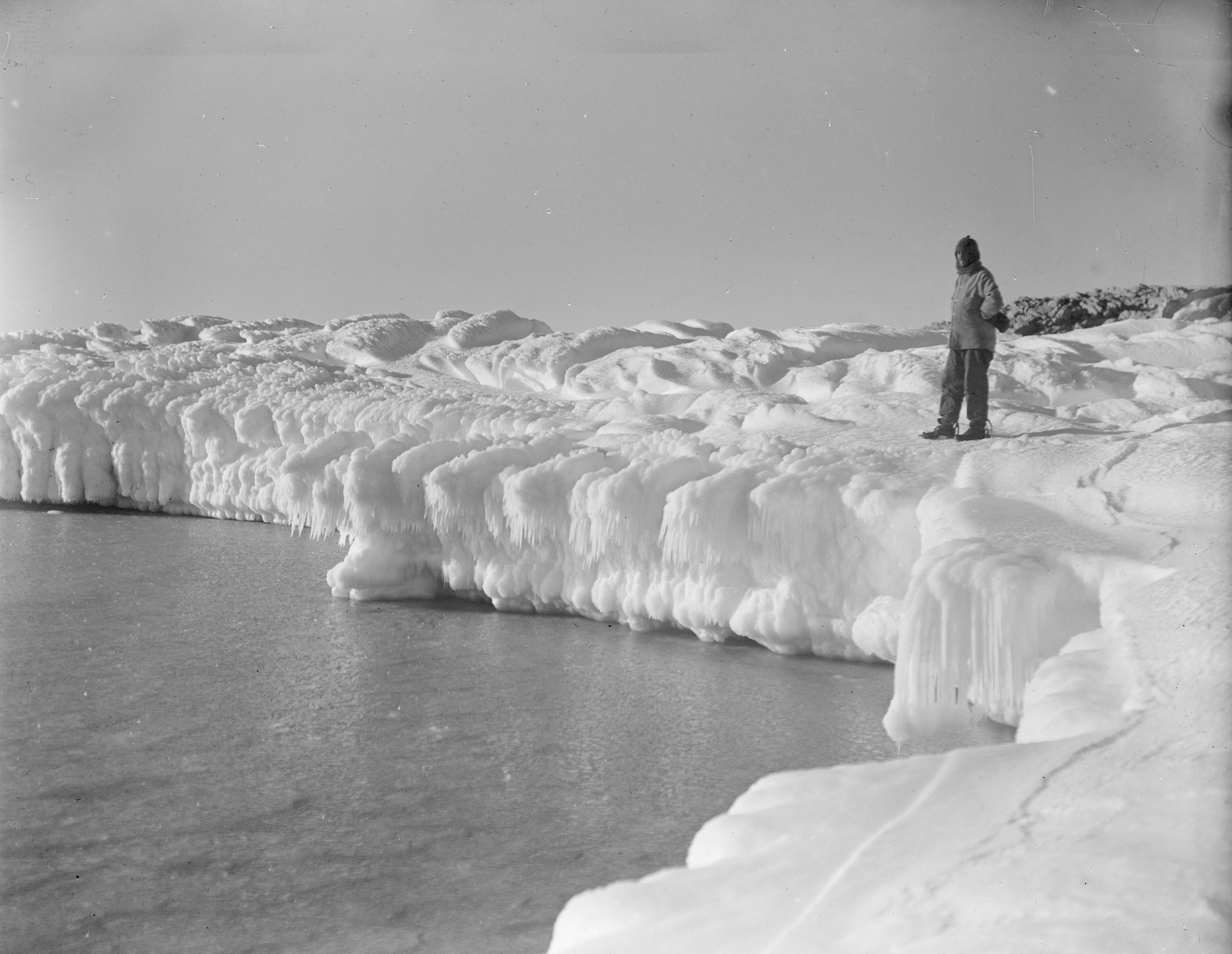
Charles Laseron, Australasian Antarctic Expedition, Cape Denison, Antarctica, 1912

He was a member of the Australasian Antarctic Expedition under (Sir) Douglas Mawson. He travelled with Frank Hurley, Bob Bage, Eric Webb, Herbert Murphy and John Hunter. The group travelled by sledge, departing their base camp on 10 November 1912. Murphy, Hunter and Laseron were the support party for Hurley, Bage and Webb, and turned back on 22 November 1912 after setting up a supply depot.

== War service ==
Yesterday we visited the Pyramids & climbed to the top ... I was struck with the immensity of the affair, for even at this height the world is spread at ones feet, and the immensity of the bulk of the pyramid reaching downwards and upwards and sideways seems terribly huge. The view from the top I will not describe. Sufficient to say it is wonderful. How many armies have camped in its shadow.

— Charles Francis Laseron (personal diary)

Following the outbreak of World War I, Laseron enlisted in the First Australian Imperial Force on 9 September 1914. He sailed from Melbourne in December 1914 on the SS Ulysses. Laseron served with the 13th Battalion in the Gallipoli Campaign, being wounded on 27 April 1915 at Anzac Cove. After spending three months in hospital in England he was discharged as medically unfit.

== Later life ==
Laseron returned to work at the museum after his discharge, working in the geology department and later in applied art. He campaigned unsuccessfully for the establishment of a formal collection, and resigned in 1929 to set up his own business as an antique-dealer and auctioneer. He served again during World War II as a map reading instructor but was discharged as medically unfit due to illness in 1944.

Laseron died on 27 June 1959 in Concord Repatriation General Hospital. He was survived by his wife Mary, who he had married on 22 March 1919, and their children.

== Works ==
- An Autobiography, Sydney, 1904
- From Australia to the Dardanelles, 1916
- South with Mawson, 1947
- The Face of Australia, 1953
- Ancient Australia, 1954

== See also ==
- List of Australian diarists of World War I
