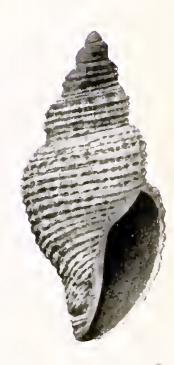
- Shell of Oenopota healyi

Scientific classification
- Kingdom: Animalia
- Phylum: Mollusca
- Class: Gastropoda
- Subclass: Caenogastropoda
- Order: Neogastropoda
- Superfamily: Conoidea
- Family: Mangeliidae
- Genus: Oenopota; Mörch, 1852

Type species
- Fusus pleurotomarius Couthouy, 1838

Species
- See text

Synonyms
- Lora Auctores non Gray, 1847; Nodotoma Bartsch, 1941; Onopota H. and A. Adams

= Oenopota =

Genus of gastropods

Oenopota is a genus of sea snails, marine gastropod mollusks in the family Mangeliidae.

This genus does not form a monophyletic group, therefore many species are only tentatively placed within it.

== Description ==
In 1941 Paul Bartsch described species in this genus as having large, heavy and elongate -ovate to elongate- turreted shells. The protoconch is smooth at the apex, succeeded by a whorl with three spiral cords and rather distantly spaced axial ribs. The longitudinal ribs become stronger on succeeding whorls but evanesce at the base of the shell. The spiral sculpture weakens on succeeding whorls and finally becomes mere threads. The pear-shaped aperture is deeply channeled anteriorly. It shows in the outer lip near the summit a feeble posterior sinus.

Later, in 1980, it has been stated by Bouchet & Warèn that there is a high variation within the arctic forms of this genus, such as the outer lip showing all transitions from sinuated to nonsinuated

== Distribution ==
Oenopota is a boreal genus, with many species occurring in arctic and subarctic regions. They are less common in more southern waters where they occur in deeper, colder waters.

== Species ==
Species within the genus Oenopota include:

- Oenopota admetoides (Okutani, 1968)
- Oenopota alba Golikov & Scarlato, 1985
- Oenopota aleutica (W.H. Dall, 1871)
- Oenopota althorpensis (W.H. Dall, 1919)
- Oenopota althorpi (W.H. Dall, 1919)
- Oenopota amiata W.H. Dall, 1919
- Oenopota babylonia W.H. Dall, 1919
- Oenopota biconica Bogdanov, 1989
- Oenopota blaneyi (Bush, 1909)
- Oenopota candida (Yokoyama, 1926)
- Oenopota carioca Figueira & Absalão, 2010
- Oenopota casentina (Dall, 1919)
- Oenopota cinerea (Møller, 1842)
- Oenopota cingulata Golikov & Gulbin, 1977
- Oenopota convexigyra Bouchet & Warén, 1980
- Oenopota cunninghami (Smith, E.A., 1881)
- Oenopota declivis (Lovén, 1846)
- Oenopota diabula Figueira & Absalão, 2010
- Oenopota dictyophora Bouchet & Warén, 1980
- Oenopota dubia Golikov & Scarlato, 1985
- Oenopota elegans (Møller, 1842)
- Oenopota elongata Bogdanov, 1989
- Oenopota eriopis (W.H. Dall, 1919)
- Oenopota excurvata (Carpenter, 1864)
- Oenopota gilpini (Verkrüzen, 1878): nomen dubium
- Oenopota granitica (W.H. Dall, 1919)
- Oenopota graphica (Locard, 1897)
- Oenopota greenlandica (L.A. Reeve, 1846)
- Oenopota hanazakiensis (Habe, 1958)
- Oenopota harpa (Dall, 1885)
- Oenopota harpularioides Golikov & Fedjakov in Golikov, 1987
- Oenopota harveyi (T.A. Verkrüzen, 1878)
- Oenopota healyi W.H. Dall, 1919
- Oenopota impressa (Mørch, 1869)
- Oenopota inequita (Dall, 1919)
- † Oenopota kagana M. Yokoyama, 1927
- † Oenopota kakumensis N. Onoyama, 1938
- Oenopota kazusensis (Nomura, 1940)
- Oenopota kinkasanensis Golikov & Gulbin, 1977
- † Oenopota komakahida (K. Otsuka, 1949)
- Oenopota koreni (Friele, 1882)
- Oenopota kurilensis Bogdanov, 1989
- Oenopota kyskana W.H. Dall, 1919
- Oenopota laticostulata Golikov & Scarlato, 1985
- Oenopota levidensis (Carpenter, 1864)
- Oenopota lutkeana A. Krause, 1886
- Oenopota maclaini (Dall, 1902)
- Oenopota magellanica (Martens, 1881)
- Oenopota maurellei (W.H. Dall & P. Bartsch, 1910)
- Oenopota morchi (W. Leche, 1878)
- Oenopota multicostata (Verkrüzen, 1878): nomen dubium
- Oenopota murdochiana (Dall, 1885)
- Oenopota nunivakensis W.H. Dall, 1919
- Oenopota obliqua (Sars G.O., 1878)
- Oenopota obsoleta Golikov & Scarlato, 1985
- Oenopota ogasawarana Okutani, Fujikura & Sasaki, 1993
- Oenopota okudai Habe, 1958
- Oenopota pavlova (Dall, 1919)
- Oenopota pingelii (Møller, 1842)
- Oenopota pyramidalis (Ström, 1788)
- Oenopota quadra (Dall, 1919)
- Oenopota raduga Bogdanov, 1985
- Oenopota reticulosculpturata Sysoev, 1988
- Oenopota rosea (S.L. Lovén, 1846)
- Oenopota rubescens (Jeffreys, 1876)
- Oenopota sagamiana Okutani & Fujikura, 1992
- † Oenopota sanctamonicae R. Arnold, 1903
- Oenopota schantaricum (Middendorf, 1849)
- Oenopota seraphina Figueira & Absalão, 2010
- Oenopota subturgida (A. E. Verrill, 1884)
- Oenopota subvitrea (A. E. Verrill, 1884)
- Oenopota tabulata (Carpenter, 1864)
- Oenopota tenuicostata (Sars G.O., 1878)
- Oenopota tenuissima W.H. Dall, 1919
- Oenopota tenuistriata Golikov & Scarlato, 1985
- Oenopota triphera (Golikov & Scarlato, 1967)
- Oenopota undata (Verkrüzen, 1878): nomen dubium
- Oenopota uschakovi Bogdanov, 1985
- Oenopota valentina Golikov & Gulbin, 1977
- Oenopota violacea (Mighels & Adams, 1842)

== Species brought into synonymy ==
Synonyms
- Oenopota abyssorum (Locard, 1897): synonym of Gymnobela abyssorum (Locard, 1897)
- Oenopota alaskensis (Dall, W.H., 1871): synonym of Propebela alaskensis (Dall, 1871)
- Oenopota albus T. Pennant, 1777: synonym of Propebela turricula (G. Montagu, 1803)
- Oenopota angulata E. Donovan, 1804: synonym of Propebela turricula (G. Montagu, 1803)
- Oenopota angulosa (Sars G. O., 1878): synonym of Propebela angulosa (Sars G. O., 1878) (currently placed in genus Propebela)
- Oenopota anomalapex Pwell, 1951: synonym of Propebela lateplicata (Strebel, 1905)
- Oenopota arctica (Adams, 1855): synonym of Propebela arctica (A. Adams, 1855) (currently placed in genus Propebela)
- Oenopota assimilis (Sars G. O., 1878): synonym of Propebela assimilis (Sars G. O., 1878) (currently placed in genus Propebela)
- Oenopota bartschi Bogdanov, 1985: synonym of Curtitoma bartschi (Bogdanov, 1985) (original combination)
- Oenopota beckii H.P.C. Møller, 1842: synonym of Oenopota violacea (J.W. Mighels & C.B. Adams, 1842)
- Oenopota bergensis (Friele, 1886): synonym of Propebela bergensis (Friele, 1886) (currently placed in genus Propebela)
- Oenopota bicarinata (Couthouy, 1838): synonym of Curtitoma violacea (Mighels & C. B. Adams, 1842)
- Oenopota bicarinata H.B.S. Friele, 1879: synonym of Oenopota violacea (J.W. Mighels & C.B. Adams, 1842)
- Oenopota bicarinata G.O. Sars, 1878: synonym of Oenopota violacea (J.W. Mighels & C.B. Adams, 1842)
- Oenopota borealis L.A. Reeve, 1846: synonym of Curtitoma decussata (J.P.Y. Couthouy, 1839)
- Oenopota brevior O.A.L. Mörch in H.J. Rink, 1857: synonym of Oenopota violacea (J.W. Mighels & C.B. Adams, 1842)
- Oenopota brevis W. Leche, 1878: synonym of Oenopota violacea (J.W. Mighels & C.B. Adams, 1842)
- Oenopota brychia (Verrill, 1885): synonym of Belomitra quadruplex (Watson, 1882)
- Oenopota cancellata (Mighels & Adams, 1842): synonym of Propebela cancellata (Mighels & Adams, 1842)
- Oenopota candita M. Yokoyama, 1926: synonym of Oenopota candida (M. Yokoyama, 1926)
- Oenopota castanea T. Brown, 1827: synonym of Propebela turricula (G. Montagu, 1803)
- Oenopota chiachiana W.H. Dall, 1919: synonym of Oenopota declivis (S.L. Lovén, 1846)
- Oenopota colpoica W.H. Dall, 1919: synonym of Curtitoma trevelliana (W. Turton, 1834)
- Oenopota concinnula (A. E. Verrill, 1882): synonym of Propebela concinnula (A. E. Verrill, 1882)
- Oenopota conoidea (Sars G. O., 1878): synonym of Curtitoma conoidea (Sars G. O., 1878) (currently placed in genus Curtitoma)
- Oenopota conspicienda (Locard, 1897): synonym of Belomitra quadruplex (Watson, 1882)
- Oenopota crebricostata (Carpenter, 1864): synonym of Mangelia crebricostata Carpenter, 1864
- Oenopota cylindracea H.P.C. Møller, 1842 : synonym of Oenopota violacea (J.W. Mighels & C.B. Adams, 1842)
- Oenopota davisi Hedley, 1916: synonym of Lorabela davisi Hedley, 1916) (original combination)
- Oenopota declive S.L. Lovén, 1846: synonym of Oenopota declivis (S.L. Lovén, 1846)
- Oenopota declivis J.H. Macpherson, 1971: synonym of Oenopota cancellata (J.W. Mighels & C.B. Adams, 1842)
- Oenopota decussata (Couthouy, 1839): synonym of Curtitoma decussata (Couthouy, 1839) (currently placed in genus Curtitoma)
- Oenopota decussatus (Couthouy, 1839): synonym of Curtitoma decussata (Couthouy, 1839) (wrong grammatical gender)
- Oenopota detegata É.A.A. Locard, 1897: synonym of Propebela bergensis (H.B.S. Friele, 1886)
- Oenopota diegensis W.H. Dall, 1919: synonym of Curtitoma trevelliana (W. Turton, 1834)
- Oenopota discors T. Brown, 1827 : synonym of Oenopota pyramidalis (H. Strøm, 1788)
- Oenopota dissoluta (M. Yokoyama, 1926): synonym of Granotoma dissoluta (M. Yokoyama, 1926)
- Oenopota exarata (Møller, 1842): synonym of Propebela exarata (Møller, 1842) (currently placed in genus Propebela)
- Oenopota exigua J.G. Jeffreys, 1883: synonym of Oenopota ovalis (H.B.S. Friele, 1877)
- Oenopota expansa G.O. Sars, 1878: synonym of Oenopota violacea (J.W. Mighels & C.B. Adams, 1842)
- Oenopota exquisita (Bartsch, 1941): synonym of Propebela exquisita Bartsch, 1941
- Oenopota exserta C.W.S. Aurivillius, 1885: synonym of Oenopota violacea (J.W. Mighels & C.B. Adams, 1842)
- Oenopota fidicula (Gould, 1849): synonym of Propebela fidicula (Gould, 1849)
- Oenopota furfuraculata É.A.A. Locard, 1897: synonym of Propebela bergensis (H.B.S. Friele, 1886)
- Oenopota galgana W.H. Dall, 1919: synonym of Oenopota elegans (H.P.C. Møller, 1842)
- Oenopota geminolineata H.B.S. Friele, 1879: synonym of Oenopota violacea (J.W. Mighels & C.B. Adams, 1842)
- † Oenopota gervillii G.P. Deshayes, 1862: synonym of † Buchozia gervillii (Deshayes, 1862)
- Oenopota glacialis (Thiele, 1912): synonym of Lorabela glacialis (Thiele, 1912)
- Oenopota golikovi Bogdanov, 1985: synonym of Propebela golikovi (Bogdanov, 1985) (original combination)
- Oenopota harpularia Grieg, 1931: synonym of Amphissa acutecostata (Philippi, 1844)
- Oenopota harpularia (Couthouy, 1838): synonym of Propebela harpularia (Couthouy, 1838)
- Oenopota harpularius (Couthouy, 1838): synonym of Propebela harpularia (Couthouy, 1838)
- Oenopota harucoa P. Bartsch, 1941: synonym of Venustoma lacunosa (A.A. Gould, 1860)
- Oenopota holomera É.A.A. Locard, 1897: synonym of Gymnobela pyrrhogramma (Dautzenberg & Fischer, 1896)
- Oenopota impressus (Mörch, 1869): synonym of Oenopota impressa (Mörch, 1869) (wrong grammatical gender)
- Oenopota incisula (Verrill, 1882): synonym of Curtitoma incisula (Verrill, 1882)
- Oenopota kobelti (Verkrüzen, T.A., 1876): synonym of Granotoma kobelti (Verkrüzen, 1876)
- Oenopota krausei (Dall, 1887): synonym of Granotoma krausei (Dall, 1887)
- Oenopota leucostoma L.A. Reeve, 1845: synonym of Curtitoma trevelliana (W. Turton, 1834)
- Oenopota lateplicata Strebel, 1905: synonym of Propebela lateplicata (Strebel, 1905)
- Oenopota livida H.P.C. Møller, 1842: synonym of Oenopota violacea (J.W. Mighels & C.B. Adams, 1842)
- Oenopota lotta W.H. Dall, 1919: synonym of Granotoma krausei (W.H. Dall, 1887)
- Oenopota luetkeni W.H. Dall, 1919: synonym of Granotoma krausei (W.H. Dall, 1887)
- Oenopota lyrata (Locard, 1897): synonym of Belomitra quadruplex (Watson, 1882)
- Oenopota macgillivrayi C.B. Adams, 1850: synonym of Curtitoma trevelliana (W. Turton, 1834)
- Oenopota margaritae Bogdanov, 1985: synonym of Propebela margaritae (Bogdanov, 1985) (original combination)
- Oenopota metschigmensis (Krause, 1885): synonym of Curtitoma trevelliana (Turton, 1834)
- Oenopota microvoluta T.A. Okutani, 1964: synonym of Oenopota candida (M. Yokoyama, 1926)
- Oenopota minuscularia É.A.A. Locard, 1897: synonym of Oenopota violacea (J.W. Mighels & C.B. Adams, 1842)
- Oenopota minutum J. Adams, 1797: synonym of Propebela turricula (G. Montagu, 1803)
- Oenopota mitrula (S.L. Lovén, 1846): synonym of Propebela exarata (Møller, 1842)
- Oenopota monterosatoi É.A.A. Locard, 1897: synonym of Oenopota graphica (É.A.A. Locard, 1897)
- Oenopota nazanensis W.H. Dall, 1919: synonym of Curtitoma lawrenciana (W.H. Dall, 1919)
- Oenopota nobilis (Møller, 1842): synonym of Propebela nobilis (Møller, 1842) (currently placed in genus Propebela)
- Oenopota nodulosa A. Krause, 1886: synonym of Oenopota violacea (J.W. Mighels & C.B. Adams, 1842)
- Oenopota novajasemliensis (Leche, 1878): synonym of Curtitoma novajasemljensis (Leche, 1878) (currently placed in genus Curtitoma)
- Oenopota ovalis (Friele, 1877): synonym of Curtitoma ovalis (Friele, 1877)
- Oenopota pelseneeri (Strebel, 1908): synonym of Lorabela pelseneeri (Strebel, 1908)
- Oenopota pitsya W.H. Dall, 1919: synonym of Curtitoma trevelliana (W. Turton, 1834)
- Oenopota piltuniensis Bogdanov, 1985: synonym of Curtitoma piltuniensis (Bogdanov, 1985) (original combination)
- Oenopota pleurotomaria J.P.Y. Couthouy, 1838: synonym of Oenopota pyramidalis (H. Strøm, 1788)
- Oenopota plicatula (Thiele, 1912): synonym of Lorabela plicatula (Thiele, 1912)
- Oenopota pygmaea É.A.A. Locard, 1897: synonym of Oenopota ovalis (H.B.S. Friele, 1877)
- Oenopota pygmaea A.E. Verrill, 1882: synonym of Oenopota ovalis (H.B.S. Friele, 1877)
- Oenopota quoyi C. des Moulins, 1842: synonym of Oenopota roseus (S.L. Lovén, 1846)
- Oenopota rathbuni (A. E. Verrill, 1884): synonym of Propebela rathbuni (Verrill, 1884)
- Oenopota regulus W.H. Dall, 1919: synonym of Granotoma krausei regulus (W.H. Dall, 1919)
- Oenopota reticulata (T. Brown, 1827): synonym of Curtitoma trevelliana (Turton, 1834)
- Oenopota rosea S.L. Lovén, 1846: synonym of Propebela harpularia rosea (G.O. Sars, 1868)
- Oenopota rosum S.L. Lovén, 1846: synonym of Propebela harpularia (J.P.Y. Couthouy, 1838)
- Oenopota rufa (Montagu, 1803): synonym of Propebela rufa (Montagu, 1803) (currently placed in genus Propebela)
- Oenopota rufescens G.O. Sars, 1878: synonym of Oenopota violacea (J.W. Mighels & C.B. Adams, 1842)
- Oenopota rufus G. Montagu, 1841: synonym of Oenopota pyramidalis (H. Strøm, 1788)
- Oenopota rugulata (Reeve, 1846): synonym of Propebela rugulata (Reeve, 1846) (currently placed in genus Propebela)
- Oenopota rugulatus [sic]: synonym of Propebela rugulata (Reeve, 1846) (incorrect gender ending)
- Oenopota scalaris (Møller, 1842): synonym of Propebela scalaris (Møller, 1842) (currently placed in genus Propebela)
- Oenopota scalaroides (Sars G. O., 1878): synonym of Propebela scalaroides (Sars G. O., 1878) (currently placed in genus Propebela)
- Oenopota sculpturata (Dall, 1887): synonym of Mangelia sculpturata (Dall, 1887)
- Oenopota simplex (Middendorff, 1849): synonym of Obesotoma laevigata (Dall, 1871) (preoccupied name, synonym, currently in Obesotoma)
- Oenopota simplex Locard, 1896: synonym of Amphissa acutecostata (Philippi, 1844)
- Oenopota sixta W.H. Dall in C.T. Simpson, 1919: synonym of Oenopota elegans (H.P.C. Møller, 1842)
- Oenopota spelta (Locard, 1897): synonym of Belomitra quadruplex (Watson, 1882)
- Oenopota spitzbergensis (Friele, 1886): synonym of Propebela spitzbergensis (Friele, 1886) (currently placed in genus Propebela)
- Oenopota striatula (Thiele, 1912): synonym of Belalora striatula (Thiele, 1912)
- Oenopota surana W.H. Dall, 1919: synonym of Curtitoma trevelliana (Turton, 1834)
- Oenopota tayensis (S. Nomura & K.M. Hatai, 1938): synonym of * Propebelatayensis (S. Nomura & K.M. Hatai, 1938)
- Oenopota thielei A.W.B. Powell, 1951: synonym of Oenopota cunninghami (E.A. Smith, 1881)
- Oenopota trevelliana (Turton, 1834): synonym of Curtitoma trevelliana (Turton, 1834) (currently placed in genus Curtitoma)
- Oenopota trevellianum W. Turton, 1834: synonym of Curtitoma trevelliana (Turton, 1834) (currently placed in genus Curtitoma)
- Oenopota trevelliana O.A.L. Mörch, 1871: synonym of Curtitoma trevelliana (Turton, 1834) (currently placed in genus Curtitoma)
- Oenopota trevelyana D.H. Schneider, 1886 : synonym of Curtitoma trevelliana (Turton, 1834) (currently placed in genus Curtitoma)
- Oenopota trevelyana W. Turton, 1834: synonym of Curtitoma trevelliana (Turton, 1834) (currently placed in genus Curtitoma)
- Oenopota trevyliana W. Turton, 1834 synonym of Curtitoma trevelliana (Turton, 1834) (currently placed in genus Curtitoma)
- Oenopota turricula (Montagu, 1803): synonym of Propebela turricula (Montagu, 1803) (currently placed in genus Propebela)
- Oenopota ventricosa O.A.L. Mörch, 1857: synonym of Oenopota violacea (J.W. Mighels & C.B. Adams, 1842)
- Oenopota viridula (Møller, 1842): synonym of Curtitoma finmarchia (Friele, 1886) (misidentification)
- Oenopota weirichi Engl, 2008: synonym of Belalora weirichi (Engl, 2008) (original combination)
