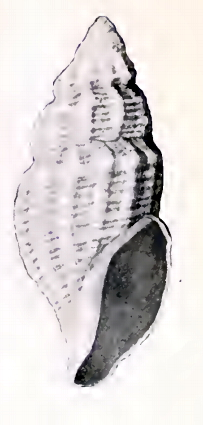
- Original image of a shell of Oenopota kyskana

Scientific classification
- Kingdom: Animalia
- Phylum: Mollusca
- Class: Gastropoda
- Subclass: Caenogastropoda
- Order: Neogastropoda
- Superfamily: Conoidea
- Family: Mangeliidae
- Genus: Oenopota
- Species: O. kyskana

Binomial name
- Oenopota kyskana (W.H. Dall, 1919)

Synonyms
- Lora kyskana W.H. Dall, 1919 (original description)

= Oenopota kyskana =

Species of gastropod

Oenopota kyskana is a species of sea snail, a marine gastropod mollusk in the family Mangeliidae.

== Description ==
The length of the shell attains 10.5 mm, its diameter 4.5 mm.

(Original description) The white shell is closely related to Propebela fidicula (Gould, 1849), but with looser and less regular sculpture. The protoconch is defective. The shell has about six shouldered whorls. The suture is distinct. The anal fasciole is obscure, undulated by the ends of the ribs, spirally striated. The axial sculpture consists of (on the body whorl 14 or 15) rounded ribs with wider interspaces, prominent at the shoulder, crossing the whorls at the spire, obsolete on the base. The spiral sculpture consists of numerous narrow channeled grooves with wider flattish interspaces, not nodulating the summits of the ribs. On the spire the interspaces are more cordlike, six or seven between the shoulder and the succeeding suture. The aperture is simple. The inner lip is erased. The siphonal canal is short and straight.

== Distribution ==
This marine species was occurs from the Aleutian Islands to Puget Sound.
