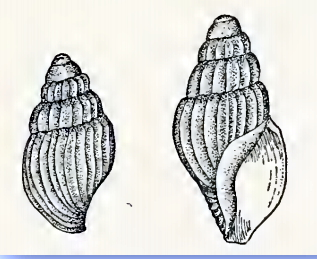
- Original image of a shell of Oenopota blaneyi

Scientific classification
- Kingdom: Animalia
- Phylum: Mollusca
- Class: Gastropoda
- Subclass: Caenogastropoda
- Order: Neogastropoda
- Superfamily: Conoidea
- Family: Mangeliidae
- Genus: Oenopota
- Species: O. blaneyi

Binomial name
- Oenopota blaneyi (Bush, 1909)

Synonyms
- Bela blaneyi Bush, 1909 (original combination)

= Oenopota blaneyi =

Species of gastropod

Oenopota blaneyi is a species of sea snail, a marine gastropod mollusk in the family Mangeliidae.

== Description ==
The length of the shell varies between 5.5 mm and 7 mm, its diameter 3–3.5 mm.

(Original description) This marine species is closely related to Curtitoma incisula (Verrill, 1882), but differs in having more elongated whorls and therefore appear more slender. 'I'he ribs are very little raised and are indicated rather by the deepened interspaces than by being raised above the general surface level along the shoulder which is roundly angulated. On some portions of the whorls these ribs blend entirely with the sinuous lines of growth. The smaller specimen of four whorls is destitute of spiral lines, either raised or incised, but the larger one of five whorls has about fifteen very faint incised spiral lines on the body whorl commencing well below the shoulder and are so shallow as to scarcely interrupt the otherwise smooth surface. There are also occasional faint indications of one or two spirals just above the suture on the preceding whorl. The one 1½ whorls of the protoconch are well rounded and apparently smooth (this may be due to erosion) and regularly coiled. The epidermal layer has a delicate yellow tint.

== Distribution ==
This marine species occurs off Maine, United States.
