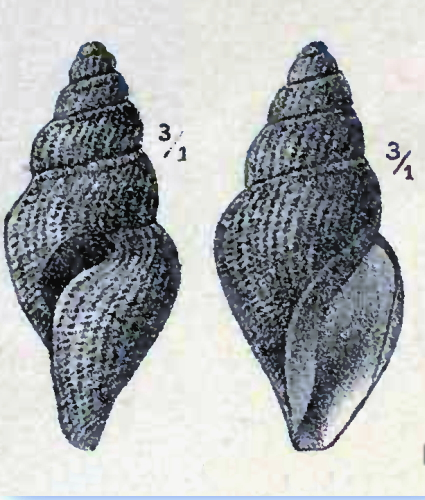
- Two views of a shell of Oenopota tenuicostata

Scientific classification
- Kingdom: Animalia
- Phylum: Mollusca
- Class: Gastropoda
- Subclass: Caenogastropoda
- Order: Neogastropoda
- Superfamily: Conoidea
- Family: Mangeliidae
- Genus: Oenopota
- Species: O. tenuicostata

Binomial name
- Oenopota tenuicostata (Sars G.O., 1878)

Synonyms
- Bela conoidea Friele, H., 1886; Bela finmarchia Friele, H., 1886; Bela tenuicostata Sars G. O., 1878 (original combination); Bela willei Friele, H., 1877; Pleurotoma scalaris Reeve, L.A., 1845

= Oenopota tenuicostata =

Species of gastropod

Oenopota tenuicostata is a species of sea snail, a marine gastropod mollusk in the family Mangeliidae.

== Description ==
The length of the shell varies from 5 mm to 13 mm.

This species resembles Curtitoma decussata (Couthouy, 1839) but is smaller and has more numerous ribs.

== Distribution ==
This marine species occurs off Greenland and Novaya Zemlya at depths between 200 m and 2702 m.
