= Oenopota harpularioides =

Scientific classification
- Kingdom: Animalia
- Phylum: Mollusca
- Class: Gastropoda
- Subclass: Caenogastropoda
- Order: Neogastropoda
- Superfamily: Conoidea
- Family: Mangeliidae
- Genus: Oenopota
- Species: O. harpularioides

Binomial name
- Oenopota harpularioides Golikov & Fedjakov in Golikov, 1987

Species of gastropod

Oenopota harpularioides is a species of sea snail, a marine gastropod mollusk in the family Mangeliidae.

The taxonomy is this species is uncertain. Relying on Tucker, the website |Gastropods.com states this species as Oenopota harpularius (Couthouy, J.P., 1838), while WoRMS states Oenopota harpularius as a synonym of Propebela harpularia (Couthouy, 1838)

== Description ==
The length of the shell varies between 6 mm and 19 mm.

== Distribution ==
This species occurs on boreal and arctic seas.
