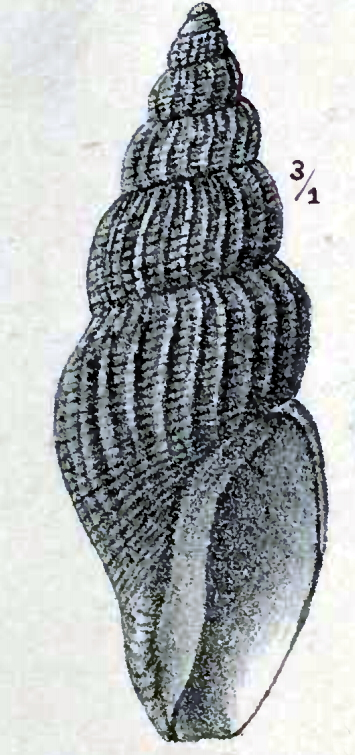
- Drawing of a shell of Oenopota declivis

Scientific classification
- Kingdom: Animalia
- Phylum: Mollusca
- Class: Gastropoda
- Subclass: Caenogastropoda
- Order: Neogastropoda
- Superfamily: Conoidea
- Family: Mangeliidae
- Genus: Oenopota
- Species: O. declivis

Binomial name
- Oenopota declivis (Lovén, 1846)

Synonyms
- Lora chiachiana Dall, W.H., 1919; Nodotoma declivis (Lovén, S.L., 1846); Oenopota chiachiana (W.H. Dall, 1919); Oenopota declive S.L. Lovén, 1846; Tritonium declive Loven, 1846 (basionym)

= Oenopota declivis =

Species of gastropod

Oenopota declivis is a species of sea snail, a marine gastropod mollusk in the family Mangeliidae.

Subspecies
Oenopota declivis angustior (J.G. Jeffreys, 1877)

== Description ==
The length of the shell varies between 9 mm and 20 mm.

The characters of this shell are close to Oenopota cinerea (Møller, 1842), but the shell is longer in the spire and narrower, with slightly stronger shoulder, fewer ribs and revolving striae. The sculpture is cancellated. The aperture is broadly truncate below.

== Distribution ==
This species occurs in European waters, in the Northwest Atlantic Ocean and in the arctic waters of Canada and off Nova Zembla, Russia
