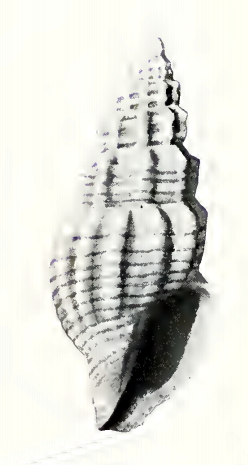
- Original image of a shell of Oenopota althorpi

Scientific classification
- Kingdom: Animalia
- Phylum: Mollusca
- Class: Gastropoda
- Subclass: Caenogastropoda
- Order: Neogastropoda
- Superfamily: Conoidea
- Family: Mangeliidae
- Genus: Oenopota
- Species: O. althorpi

Binomial name
- Oenopota althorpi (W. H. Dall, 1919)

Synonyms
- Mangelia althorpi (W. H. Dall, 1919); Mangilia althorpi W. H. Dall, 1919 (original description)

= Oenopota althorpi =

Species of gastropod

Oenopota althorpi is a species of sea snail, a marine gastropod mollusk in the family Mangeliidae.

== Description ==
The length of the shell attains 11.5 mm, its diameter 4.5 mm.

(Original description) The small shell is waxen white, superficially resembling Oenopota granitica (W. H. Dall, 1919), but differing in the following particulars: It has one rib less; the two prominent spiral cords on the early whorls are strongly nodulous when they cross the ribs, especially the posterior cord, even on the body whorl. The spiral sculpture on the body whorl in front of the fasciole comprises 10 strong flattish cords, separated by very sharp, narrow grooves, with no spiral sculpture on the back of the siphonal canal, which is distinctly shorter. The aperture is relatively shorter and wider. The protoconch is apparently similar but eroded, the number of whorls is the same but the shell is shorter.

== Distribution ==
This species occurs off Alaska, found at Port Althorp.
