= Oenopota rosea =

Scientific classification
- Kingdom: Animalia
- Phylum: Mollusca
- Class: Gastropoda
- Subclass: Caenogastropoda
- Order: Neogastropoda
- Superfamily: Conoidea
- Family: Mangeliidae
- Genus: Oenopota
- Species: O. rosea

Binomial name
- Oenopota rosea (Lovén, 1846)

Synonyms
- Lora rosea Sars, 1846; Oenopota quoyi C. des Moulins, 1842

Species of gastropod

Oenopota rosea is a species of sea snail, a marine gastropod mollusc in the family Mangeliidae.

According to J.Tucker, this species is a synonym of Oenopota harpularius, itself a synonym of Propebela harpularia (Couthouy, 1838)

== Distribution ==
This marine species is circumboreal and also occurs off Alaska, Simeonoff Island to San Juan Islands, Washington, USA.
