= Oenopota sagamiana =

Scientific classification
- Kingdom: Animalia
- Phylum: Mollusca
- Class: Gastropoda
- Subclass: Caenogastropoda
- Order: Neogastropoda
- Superfamily: Conoidea
- Family: Mangeliidae
- Genus: Oenopota
- Species: O. sagamiana

Binomial name
- Oenopota sagamiana Okutani & Fujikura, 1992

Species of gastropod

Oenopota sagamiana is a species of sea snail, a marine gastropod mollusk in the family Mangeliidae.

== Distribution ==
This marine species was found off Hatsushima, Sagami Bay, Japan.
