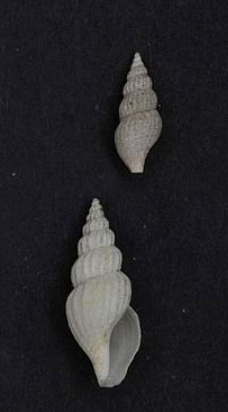
- Shells of Oenopota pingelii (museum specimens at Naturalis Biodiversity Center)

Scientific classification
- Kingdom: Animalia
- Phylum: Mollusca
- Class: Gastropoda
- Subclass: Caenogastropoda
- Order: Neogastropoda
- Superfamily: Conoidea
- Family: Mangeliidae
- Genus: Oenopota
- Species: O. pingelii

Binomial name
- Oenopota pingelii (Møller, 1842)

Synonyms
- Bela pingelii (Møller, 1842); Defrancia pingelii Møller, 1842 (original description); Lora pingelii (Møller, 1842); Pleurotomoides pingelii (H.P.C. Møller, 1842)

= Oenopota pingelii =

Species of gastropod

Oenopota pingelii is a species of sea snail, a marine gastropod mollusk in the family Mangeliidae.

== Description ==
The length of the shell varies between 10 mm and 13 mm.

The slender shell has an elongated spire, and moderately convex whorls. It shows numerous longitudinal, rather straight ribs, excurved above, and strong, elevated spiral lines, forming nodules where they cross the ribs. Its color is pale chestnut-brown, with the siphonal canal and the columella whitish.

== Distribution ==
This species occurs in European waters, the Northwest Atlantic Ocean (Norway, Greenland) and the Gulf of Maine.; also in the Okhotsk Sea.
