= Oenopota gilpini =

Scientific classification
- Kingdom: Animalia
- Phylum: Mollusca
- Class: Gastropoda
- Subclass: Caenogastropoda
- Order: Neogastropoda
- Superfamily: Conoidea
- Family: Mangeliidae
- Genus: Oenopota
- Species: O. gilpini

Binomial name
- Oenopota gilpini (T.A. Verkrüzen, 1878)

Synonyms
- Bela gilpini Verkrüzen, 1878

Species of gastropod

Oenopota gilpini is a species of sea snail, a marine gastropod mollusk in the family Mangeliidae.

This species is considered a nomen dubium.

== Description ==
Th length of the shell attains 6.5 mm. The last whorl takes up about two thirds (around 56-75 %) of shell's length. Size: Up to 12 x 5 mm

== Distribution ==
This marine species occurs in the Bay of Fundy, Nova Scotia, Canada.
