= Oenopota magellanica =

Scientific classification
- Kingdom: Animalia
- Phylum: Mollusca
- Class: Gastropoda
- Subclass: Caenogastropoda
- Order: Neogastropoda
- Superfamily: Conoidea
- Family: Mangeliidae
- Genus: Oenopota
- Species: O. magellanica

Binomial name
- Oenopota magellanica (Martens, 1881)

Synonyms
- Bela magellanica (Martens, 1881); Mangelia magellanica (Martens, 1881); Pleurotoma magellanica Martens, 1881 (original combination)

Species of gastropod

Oenopota magellanica is a species of sea snail, a marine gastropod mollusk in the family Mangeliidae.

== Description ==
The length of the shell attains 7 mm.

== Distribution ==
This marine species occurs off Rio Grande do Sul, Brazil and off Argentina.
