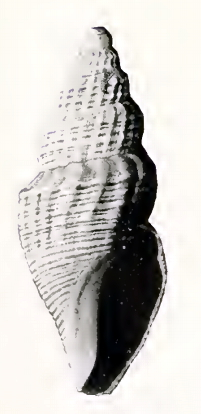
- Original image of a shell of Oenopota inequita

Scientific classification
- Kingdom: Animalia
- Phylum: Mollusca
- Class: Gastropoda
- Subclass: Caenogastropoda
- Order: Neogastropoda
- Superfamily: Conoidea
- Family: Mangeliidae
- Genus: Oenopota
- Species: O. inequita

Binomial name
- Oenopota inequita (W.H. Dall, 1919)

Synonyms
- Lora inequita W.H. Dall, 1919 (original description); Nodotoma inequita (W.H. Dall, 1919)

= Oenopota inequita =

Species of gastropod

Oenopota inequita is a species of sea snail, a marine gastropod mollusk in the family Mangeliidae.

== Description ==
The length of the shell attains 11 mm, its diameter 4 mm.

(Original description) The thin shell is yellowish white. It contains about six moderately rounded whorls, the protoconch is eroded. The suture is distinct. The spiral sculpture on the early whorls consists of two strong cords one on each side of the periphery between which are first one, later two, and finally four smaller threads. The posterior cord gives the whorl a slight shoulder. On the body whorl in front of the anterior cord to the end of the siphonal canal are smaller, more or less alternate flattish cords close-set, the interspaces wider on the canal. The axial sculpture consists of (on the penultimate whorl about 20) rounded sigmoid ribs with wider or subequal interspaces, crossing the early whorls, becoming less evident on the later whorls, and obsolete on the base of the body whorl. The incremental lines are more or less evident. The aperture is narrow and simple. The columella is white, erased and attenuated in front.

== Distribution ==
This marine species was found in Plover Bay, Bering Sea and off Japan.
