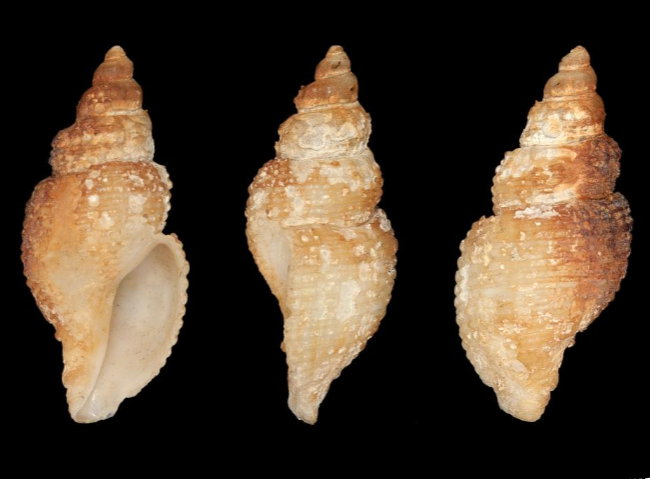
- Shell of Oenopota healyi (holotype at the Smithsonian Institution)

Scientific classification
- Kingdom: Animalia
- Phylum: Mollusca
- Class: Gastropoda
- Subclass: Caenogastropoda
- Order: Neogastropoda
- Superfamily: Conoidea
- Family: Mangeliidae
- Genus: Oenopota
- Species: O. healyi

Binomial name
- Oenopota healyi (W. H. Dall, 1919)

Synonyms
- Lora healyi W. H. Dall, 1919 (original description)

= Oenopota healyi =

Species of gastropod

Oenopota healyi is a species of sea snail, a marine gastropod mollusk in the family Mangeliidae.

== Description ==
The length of the shell attains 15 mm, its diameter 7 mm.

(Original description) The white shell is more or less discolored by ferruginous red (probably adventitious). It contains 5½ rounded whorls, a subglobular smooth protoconch forming1½ of these. The spiral sculpture consists of (on the penultimate whorl 6 or 7, on the body whorl about 14) coarse rather irregular cords with narrower channelled interspaces. The cords are more or less nodulated by incremental lines and on the spire by obscure ribbing. The suture is distinct. The aperture is narrow and simple. The columella is white and erased. The siphonal canal is short and straight.

== Distribution ==
This marine species was occurs in the Arctic Ocean north of Bering Straits.
