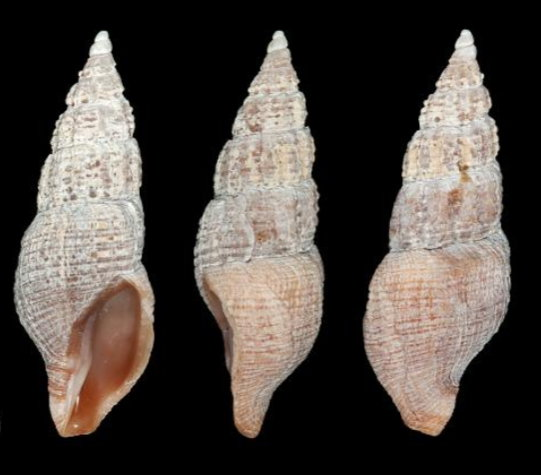
- Shell of Oenopota levidensis (lectotype at the Smithsonian Institution)

Scientific classification
- Kingdom: Animalia
- Phylum: Mollusca
- Class: Gastropoda
- Subclass: Caenogastropoda
- Order: Neogastropoda
- Superfamily: Conoidea
- Family: Mangeliidae
- Genus: Oenopota
- Species: O. levidensis

Binomial name
- Oenopota levidensis (Carpenter, 1864)

Synonyms
- Mangelia levidensis Carpenter, 1864; Mangilia (Clathromangilia) levidensis Carpenter, 1864

= Oenopota levidensis =

Species of gastropod

Oenopota levidensis is a species of sea snail, a marine gastropod mollusk in the family Mangeliidae. It was first formally described and named Oenopota levidensis in 1864 by P.P. Carpenter.

== Description ==
The length of the shell attains 17 mm. Carpenter's types from Neeah Bay and Puget Sound were badly worn, imperfect specimens, hardly identifiable. The color of the fresh shell is dark brown, and the sculpture on the body whorl in older specimens is often more or less obsolete.

== Distribution ==
This marine species occurs in the Salish Sea, Northwest America.
