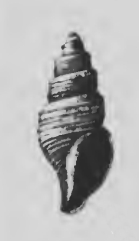
- Original image of a shell of Oenopota maurellei

Scientific classification
- Kingdom: Animalia
- Phylum: Mollusca
- Class: Gastropoda
- Subclass: Caenogastropoda
- Order: Neogastropoda
- Superfamily: Conoidea
- Family: Mangeliidae
- Genus: Oenopota
- Species: O. maurellei

Binomial name
- Oenopota maurellei (W. H. Dall & P. Bartsch, 1910)

Synonyms
- Bela maurellei W. H. Dall & P. Bartsch, 1910

= Oenopota maurellei =

Species of gastropod

Oenopota maurellei is a species of sea snail, a marine gastropod mollusk in the family Mangeliidae.

== Description ==
The length of the (immature) shell attains 8.5 mm, its diameter 3.5 mm.

(Original description) The small, fusiform shell is greenish white. it contains about six whorls. The first whorl of the protoconch is flattish, minute, apparently smooth. The second whorl shows a sharp prominent shoulder-keel, crossed by numerous minute riblets, much lower than the keel. On the next whorl the periphery bears a keel like that at the shoulder, and the riblets gradually become stronger, and fewer in number, diminishing, however, on the following whorls to mere axial striations. The peripheral keel also loses its prominence. On the later whorls, which still preserve—though with less prominence—the keel at the shoulder, the spiral sculpture becomes predominant. And on the spire there are about four spiral threads between the shoulder and the suture in front of it, and on the body whorl about ten between the shoulder and the beginning of the siphonal canal, which is also spirally striated. The prominent shoulder gives a turreted aspect to the whorls.:The aperture is narrow. The outer lip is sharp. The anal sulcus is shallow and feeble. The columella is white, and attenuate in front. The siphonal canal is short, and wide. The operculum is ovate, somewhat concave, and with an apical nucleus.

== Distribution ==
This marine species occurs off Vancouver Island, Canada.
