= Oenopota biconica =

Scientific classification
- Kingdom: Animalia
- Phylum: Mollusca
- Class: Gastropoda
- Subclass: Caenogastropoda
- Order: Neogastropoda
- Superfamily: Conoidea
- Family: Mangeliidae
- Genus: Oenopota
- Species: O. biconica

Binomial name
- Oenopota biconica Bogdanov, 1989

Synonyms
- Nodotoma biconica (Bogdanov, 1989)

Species of gastropod

Oenopota biconica is a species of sea snail, a marine gastropod mollusk in the family Mangeliidae.

== Description ==
The length of the shell varies between 10 mm and 14 mm.

== Distribution ==
This species occurs in the Sea of Japan.
