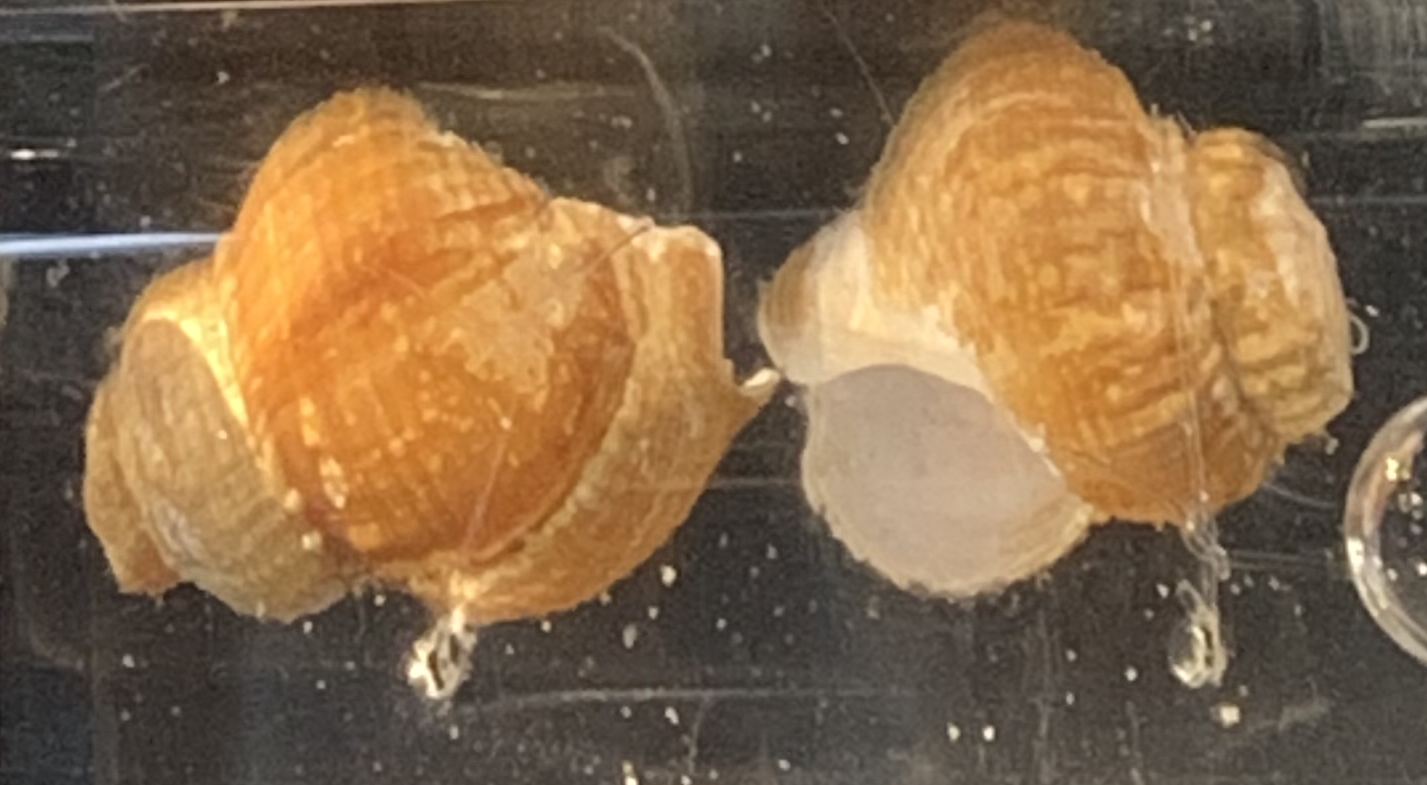

Scientific classification
- Kingdom: Animalia
- Phylum: Mollusca
- Class: Gastropoda
- Subclass: Caenogastropoda
- Order: Neogastropoda
- Superfamily: Conoidea
- Family: Mangeliidae
- Genus: Oenopota
- Species: O. ogasawarana

Binomial name
- Oenopota ogasawarana Okutani, Fujikura & Sasaki, 1993

= Oenopota ogasawarana =

Species of gastropod

Oenopota ogasawarana is a species of sea snail, a marine gastropod mollusk in the family Mangeliidae.

== Distribution ==
This marine species occurs on the Kaikata Seamount, west off Ogasawara Islands, Japan. at depths between 440 m and 450 m
