= Oenopota komakahida =

Scientific classification
- Kingdom: Animalia
- Phylum: Mollusca
- Class: Gastropoda
- Subclass: Caenogastropoda
- Order: Neogastropoda
- Superfamily: Conoidea
- Family: Mangeliidae
- Genus: Oenopota
- Species: O. komakahida

Binomial name
- Oenopota komakahida (K. Otsuka, 1949)

Synonyms
- † Lora komakahida K. Otsuka, 1949; Propebela komakahida (K. Otsuka, 1949)

Species of gastropod

Oenopota komakahida is a species of sea snail, a marine gastropod mollusk in the family Mangeliidae.

== Distribution ==
This marine species is endemic to Japan found at depths between 200 m and 350 m; and has also fossil records.
