= Oenopota greenlandica =

Scientific classification
- Kingdom: Animalia
- Phylum: Mollusca
- Class: Gastropoda
- Subclass: Caenogastropoda
- Order: Neogastropoda
- Superfamily: Conoidea
- Family: Mangeliidae
- Genus: Oenopota
- Species: O. greenlandica

Binomial name
- Oenopota greenlandica (Reeve, L.A., 1846)

Synonyms
- Defrancia suturalis Reeve, 1846; not Millet, 1828; Pleurotoma greenlandica Reeve, 1846

Species of gastropod

Oenopota greenlandica is a species of sea snail, a marine gastropod mollusk in the family Mangeliidae.

This is a nomen dubium.

== Distribution ==
This marine species occurs off Western Greenland.
