= Oenopota candida =

Scientific classification
- Kingdom: Animalia
- Phylum: Mollusca
- Class: Gastropoda
- Subclass: Caenogastropoda
- Order: Neogastropoda
- Superfamily: Conoidea
- Family: Mangeliidae
- Genus: Oenopota
- Species: O. candida

Binomial name
- Oenopota candida (Yokoyama, 1926)

Synonyms
- † Bela candida Yokoyama, 1926 (basionym); Curtitoma candida Kantor & Sysoev, 2006; Curtitoma microvoluta (Okutani, 1964); † Nematoma microvoluta Okutani, 1964; Oenopota candita M. Yokoyama, 1926; Oenopota microvoluta T.A. Okutani, 1964; Turritoma candida M. Yokoyama, 1926; Turritoma exquisita P. Bartsch, 1941

Species of gastropod

Oenopota candida is a species of sea snail, a marine gastropod mollusk in the family Mangeliidae.

== Description ==
The length of the shell attains 7 mm.

== Distribution ==
This is an Asian low-boreal species, found off Japan at depths between 269 m and 340 m. The species was described based on a Pliocene fossil from the Sawane Formation on Sado Island, in the Sea of Japan
