= Oenopota raduga =

Scientific classification
- Kingdom: Animalia
- Phylum: Mollusca
- Class: Gastropoda
- Subclass: Caenogastropoda
- Order: Neogastropoda
- Superfamily: Conoidea
- Family: Mangeliidae
- Genus: Oenopota
- Species: O. raduga

Binomial name
- Oenopota raduga Bogdanov, 1985

Synonyms
- Granotoma raduga (Bogdanov, 1985)

Species of gastropod

Oenopota raduga is a species of sea snail, a marine gastropod mollusk in the family Mangeliidae.

== Description ==
The length of the shell attains 6.5 mm.

== Distribution ==
This species occurs in the Sea of Japan and off Kamchatka.
