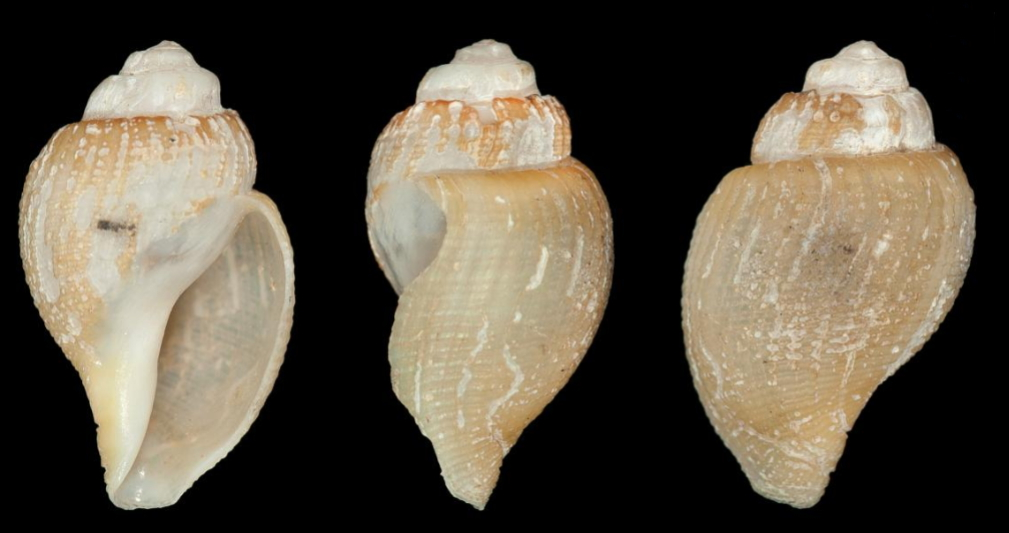
- Shell of Oenopota murdochiana (holotype at the Smithsonian Institution)

Scientific classification
- Kingdom: Animalia
- Phylum: Mollusca
- Class: Gastropoda
- Subclass: Caenogastropoda
- Order: Neogastropoda
- Superfamily: Conoidea
- Family: Mangeliidae
- Genus: Oenopota
- Species: O. murdochiana

Binomial name
- Oenopota murdochiana (Dall, 1885)

Synonyms
- Bela murdochiana Dall, 1885 (original description)

= Oenopota murdochiana =

Species of gastropod

Oenopota murdochiana is a species of sea snail, a marine gastropod mollusk in the family Mangeliidae.

== Description ==
The length of the shell measures 11.5 mm.

(Original description) The whitish shell is short, stout, with rather coarse sculpture and very short spire. It contains about five whorls, the body whorl much the largest . The whorls are inflated. The suture is deep, almost channeled. The sculpture consists of numerous (on the body whorl about two to the millimeter) narrow, backwardly convex, flexuous riblets with about equal interspaces, strongest near the suture, not crossing the fasciole and obsolete near the periphery. The lines of growth are distinct, crossed by numerous (about six to the millimeter) rather coarse threads, of which each alternate one tends to be smaller, separated by narrow grooves and about uniformly distributed over the surface, with a tendency to a faint carina in front of the indistinct fasciole. The outer lip is sharp. The simple columella is white. The aperture is pinkish. The short siphonal canal is wide. The whorls of the protoconch are eroded in the specimens. The operculum has a light horn color. It is rather broad and short. The soft parts are pink.

== Distribution ==
This marine species was found off Cape Smythe, Alaska at a depth of 9 m.
