= Oenopota kagana =

Scientific classification
- Kingdom: Animalia
- Phylum: Mollusca
- Class: Gastropoda
- Subclass: Caenogastropoda
- Order: Neogastropoda
- Superfamily: Conoidea
- Family: Mangeliidae
- Genus: Oenopota
- Species: O. kagana

Binomial name
- Oenopota kagana (Yokoyama, 1927)

Synonyms
- † Bela kagana Yokoyama, 1927; † Lora kagana (Yokoyama, 1927)

Extinct species of gastropod

Oenopota kagana is an extinct species of sea snail, a marine gastropod mollusk in the family Mangeliidae.

== Description ==
The length of the shell attains 21 mm.

== Distribution ==
This extinct marine species was found in Pleistocene strata from Ishikawa, Japan.
