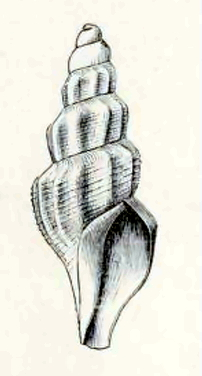
- Original image of a shell of Oenopota aleutica

Scientific classification
- Kingdom: Animalia
- Phylum: Mollusca
- Class: Gastropoda
- Subclass: Caenogastropoda
- Order: Neogastropoda
- Superfamily: Conoidea
- Family: Mangeliidae
- Genus: Oenopota
- Species: O. aleutica

Binomial name
- Oenopota aleutica (Dall, 1871)

Synonyms
- Bela aleutica (Dall, 1871); Mangilia aleutica (Dall, 1871); Mangelia aleutica (Dall, 1871) (original description)

= Oenopota aleutica =

Species of gastropod

Oenopota aleutica is a species of sea snail, a marine gastropod mollusk in the family Mangeliidae.

== Description ==
The shell is elongated and acuminated. Its color varies from pure white to dark red brown. It contains seven whorls, carinated above, though not very strongly. The aperture is narrow, long, two fifths the length of the shell. The outer lip is sharp, thin, strongly flexuous, produced below. The sinus is close to but not on the suture, not very deep or prominent. The siphonal canal is one-third as long as the aperture, straight, narrow. The columella is smooth, almost straight, without callus. The protoconch is smooth white, pointed, drawn out. The sculpture consists of longitudinal ribs thirteen or fourteen on the body whorl, obsolete on the lower third of the whorl and not extending to the suture, below which is a smooth band only marked by oblique lines of growth. The ribs are slightly nodulous at their posterior terminations (where they are united by a slight carina) strong on the upper whorls, slightly flexuous on the convexity of the whorl. The whorl below the carina is marked by very faint grooves close together and passing over the ribs, stronger at the anterior end of the body whorl.

== Distribution ==
This species occurs off Alaska, from Cape Sabine to the Fuca Strait.
