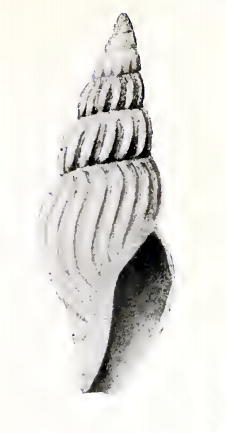
- Original image of a shell of Oenopota nunivakensis

Scientific classification
- Kingdom: Animalia
- Phylum: Mollusca
- Class: Gastropoda
- Subclass: Caenogastropoda
- Order: Neogastropoda
- Superfamily: Conoidea
- Family: Mangeliidae
- Genus: Oenopota
- Species: O. nunivakensis

Binomial name
- Oenopota nunivakensis (W. H. Dall, 1919)

Synonyms
- Mangilia nunivakensis W. H. Dall, 1919 (original description)

= Oenopota nunivakensis =

Species of gastropod

Oenopota nunivakensis is a species of sea snail, a marine gastropod mollusk in the family Mangeliidae.

== Description ==
The length of the shell attains 18 mm, its diameter 6 mm.

(Original description) The thin shell is rather large, whitish, acute and elevated. It contains about seven whorls, the protoconch eroded. The suture is distinct. The anal fasciole is hardly constricted, and is concavely wrinkled. The axial sculpture consists of (on the penultimate whorl about 18) protractive rather feeble, rounded ribs, with subequal interspaces, becoming obsolete on the base. There is practical no spiral sculpture. The aperture is simple. The anal sulcus is wide and shallow. The outer lip is arcuate. The siphonal canal is straight.

== Distribution ==
This marine species was found in the Bering Sea near Nunivak Island.
