= Oenopota triphera =

Scientific classification
- Kingdom: Animalia
- Phylum: Mollusca
- Class: Gastropoda
- Subclass: Caenogastropoda
- Order: Neogastropoda
- Superfamily: Conoidea
- Family: Mangeliidae
- Genus: Oenopota
- Species: O. triphera

Binomial name
- Oenopota triphera (Golikov & Scarlato, 1967)

Synonyms
- Lora triphera Golikov & Scarlato, 1967

Species of gastropod

Oenopota triphera is a species of sea snail, a marine gastropod mollusk in the family Mangeliidae.

== Distribution ==
This species occurs in the Sea of Japan.
