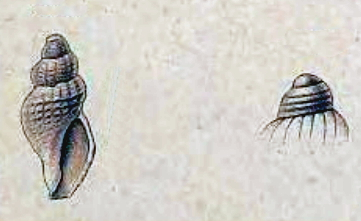
- Original image of a shell and the protoconch of Oenopota koreni

Scientific classification
- Kingdom: Animalia
- Phylum: Mollusca
- Class: Gastropoda
- Subclass: Caenogastropoda
- Order: Neogastropoda
- Superfamily: Conoidea
- Family: Mangeliidae
- Genus: Oenopota
- Species: O. koreni

Binomial name
- Oenopota koreni (Friele, 1886)

Synonyms
- Bela koreni Friele, 1886 (original combination)

= Oenopota koreni =

Species of gastropod

Oenopota koreni is a species of sea snail, a marine gastropod mollusk in the family Mangeliidae.

== Description ==
The length of the shell is 5 mm, its diameter 2.2 mm.

(Original description) The cylindrical shell has a fusiform shape. It contains 4 whorls, rounded, somewhat tumid. The protoconch is obtuse; on the primary whorl there are 3 faint spiral striations visible. The suture s shallow. The aperture is not very open and measures about half the length of the shell The siphonal canal is straight, short and wide, and at the extremity truncately transected. The sculpture consists of nearly straight axial ribs (10 on the ultimate whorl) which are, on the upper part of the whorl, alone, distinctly visible, and of pretty faint, but somewhat close-set, spiral striations. The outer lip, which is somewhat broken, appears to bear a distinct trace of a sinus.

== Distribution ==
This species occurs in the North Sea off Norway
