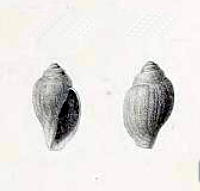
- Original image with two views of a shell of Oenopota morchi

Scientific classification
- Kingdom: Animalia
- Phylum: Mollusca
- Class: Gastropoda
- Subclass: Caenogastropoda
- Order: Neogastropoda
- Superfamily: Conoidea
- Family: Mangeliidae
- Genus: Oenopota
- Species: O. morchi

Binomial name
- Oenopota morchi (W. Leche, 1878)

Synonyms
- Lora mörchi W. Leche, 1878; Pleurotoma violacea var. mörchi W. Leche, 1878

= Oenopota morchi =

Species of gastropod

Oenopota morchi is a species of sea snail, a marine gastropod mollusk in the family Mangeliidae.

== Distribution ==
This marine species occurs off Nova Zembla, in the Arctic Ocean, to Bering Strait and in the Prince William Sound.
