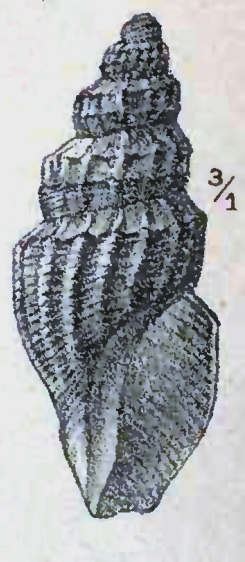
- Image of a shell of Oenopota obliqua

Scientific classification
- Kingdom: Animalia
- Phylum: Mollusca
- Class: Gastropoda
- Subclass: Caenogastropoda
- Order: Neogastropoda
- Superfamily: Conoidea
- Family: Mangeliidae
- Genus: Oenopota
- Species: O. obliqua

Binomial name
- Oenopota obliqua (Sars G.O., 1878)

Synonyms
- Bela obliqua Sars G. O., 1878

= Oenopota obliqua =

Species of gastropod

Oenopota obliqua is a species of sea snail, a marine gastropod mollusk in the family Mangeliidae.

== Description ==
The length of the shell varies between 8 mm and 11 mm.

The turriculated shell has shouldered whorls. The shoulder is acute and tuberculated by the terminations of thirteen to sixteen narrow oblique ribs. The much wider interspaces are covered by revolving striae. The aperture is rather short and broadly truncate below.

== Distribution ==
This species occurs in European waters (Northern Norway - Arctic, Russia) and in the arctic waters of Eastern Canada, Canada.
