= Oenopota sanctamonicae =

Scientific classification
- Kingdom: Animalia
- Phylum: Mollusca
- Class: Gastropoda
- Subclass: Caenogastropoda
- Order: Neogastropoda
- Superfamily: Conoidea
- Family: Mangeliidae
- Genus: Oenopota
- Species: †O. sanctamonicae

Binomial name
- †Oenopota sanctamonicae R. Arnold, 1903

Extinct species of gastropod

Oenopota sanctamonicae is an extinct species of sea snail, a marine gastropod mollusk in the family Mangeliidae.

== Distribution ==
This extinct marine species was found off San Pedro, California, USA.
