= Oenopota uschakovi =

Scientific classification
- Kingdom: Animalia
- Phylum: Mollusca
- Class: Gastropoda
- Subclass: Caenogastropoda
- Order: Neogastropoda
- Superfamily: Conoidea
- Family: Mangeliidae
- Genus: Oenopota
- Species: O. uschakovi

Binomial name
- Oenopota uschakovi Bogdanov, 1985

Synonyms
- Nodotoma uschakovi (Bogdanov, 1985)

Species of gastropod

Oenopota uschakovi is a species of sea snail, a marine gastropod mollusk in the family Mangeliidae.

== Description ==
The length of the shell varies between 7 mm and 10.5 mm.

== Distribution ==
This marine species occurs off the Far East Russia.
