= Oenopota casentina =

Scientific classification
- Kingdom: Animalia
- Phylum: Mollusca
- Class: Gastropoda
- Subclass: Caenogastropoda
- Order: Neogastropoda
- Superfamily: Conoidea
- Family: Mangeliidae
- Genus: Oenopota
- Species: O. casentina

Binomial name
- Oenopota casentina (W.H. Dall, 1919)

Synonyms
- Lora casentina Dall, 1919(original description)

Species of gastropod

Oenopota casentina is a species of sea snail, a marine gastropod mollusk in the family Mangeliidae.

== Description ==
The length of the shell varies between 8 mm and 13 mm, its diameter 5 mm.

(Original description) The small, white shell contains about five whorls, the protoconch decorticated. The whorls show a subangular shoulder in front of the anal fasciole. The axial sculpture consists of (on the penultimate whorl about 20) low, threadlike ribs extending from the shoulder to the succeeding suture, but more or less obsolete on the body whorl. The spiral sculpture consists of faint feeble striae on the fasciole. In front of the shoulder are numerous close-set flattish small threads, extending uniformly to the siphonal canal. The anal sulcus is shallow. The outer lip is slightly arcuate, the inner lip is erased. The columella is short, and straight. The siphonal canal is hardly differentiated.

== Distribution ==
This species was found in the Bering Sea, north of Unalaska.
