= Oenopota hanazakiensis =

Scientific classification
- Kingdom: Animalia
- Phylum: Mollusca
- Class: Gastropoda
- Subclass: Caenogastropoda
- Order: Neogastropoda
- Superfamily: Conoidea
- Family: Mangeliidae
- Genus: Oenopota
- Species: O. hanazakiensis

Binomial name
- Oenopota hanazakiensis (Habe, 1958)

Synonyms
- Obesotoma hanazakiensis Habe, 1958

Species of gastropod

Oenopota hanazakiensis is a species of sea snail, a marine gastropod mollusk in the family Mangeliidae.

== Distribution ==
This species occurs in the Sea of Japan.
