= Oenopota babylonia =

Scientific classification
- Kingdom: Animalia
- Phylum: Mollusca
- Class: Gastropoda
- Subclass: Caenogastropoda
- Order: Neogastropoda
- Superfamily: Conoidea
- Family: Mangeliidae
- Genus: Oenopota
- Species: O. babylonia

Binomial name
- Oenopota babylonia (W.H. Dall, 1919)

Synonyms
- Lora babylonia W.H. Dall, 1919 (original description)

Species of gastropod

Oenopota amiata is a species of sea snail, a marine gastropod mollusk in the family Mangeliidae.

== Description ==
The length of the shell attains 11 mm, its diameter 4 mm.

(Original description) The small shell is whitish. It is turreted, with about six whorls, the protoconch defective. The suture is distinct and not appressed. The spiral sculpture consists of a strong keel at the shoulder and on the base four or five feeble threads. The siphonal canal is without spiral sculpture. The axial sculpture consists of (on the body whorl about 18) rounded riblets retractive behind the keel, protractive in front of it, straight, forming a nodule at the intersection with the keel and with wider interspaces. The simple aperture is short and wide. The anal sulcus coincides with the end of the keel.

== Distribution ==
This marine species was found off Tillamook Bay, Oregon, USA.
