= Oenopota kazusensis =

Scientific classification
- Kingdom: Animalia
- Phylum: Mollusca
- Class: Gastropoda
- Subclass: Caenogastropoda
- Order: Neogastropoda
- Superfamily: Conoidea
- Family: Mangeliidae
- Genus: Oenopota
- Species: O. kazusensis

Binomial name
- Oenopota kazusensis (Nomura, 1940)

Synonyms
- Lora kazusensis Nomura, 1940

Species of gastropod

Oenopota kazusensis is a species of sea snail, a marine gastropod mollusk in the family Mangeliidae.

== Distribution ==
This marine species occurs off Japan.
