= Oenopota cingulata =

Scientific classification
- Kingdom: Animalia
- Phylum: Mollusca
- Class: Gastropoda
- Subclass: Caenogastropoda
- Order: Neogastropoda
- Superfamily: Conoidea
- Family: Mangeliidae
- Genus: Oenopota
- Species: O. cingulata

Binomial name
- Oenopota cingulata Golikov & Gulbin, 1977

Synonyms
- Canetoma cingulata (Golikov, A.N. & W.W. Gulbin, 1977)

Species of gastropod

Oenopota cingulata is a species of sea snail, a marine gastropod mollusk in the family Mangeliidae.

== Description ==
The length of the shell varies between 8 mm and 9.5 mm.

== Distribution ==
This species occurs in the Okhotsk Sea.
