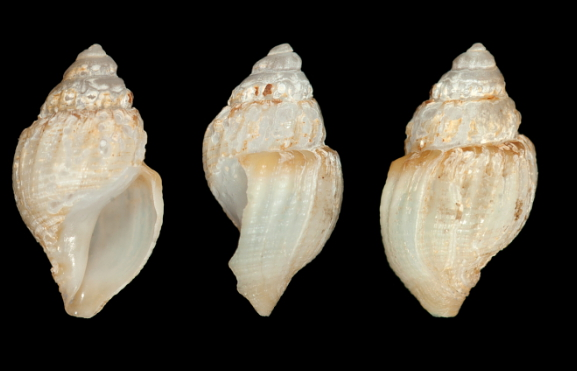
- Shell of Oenopota quadra (holotype at the Smithsonian Institution)

Scientific classification
- Kingdom: Animalia
- Phylum: Mollusca
- Class: Gastropoda
- Subclass: Caenogastropoda
- Order: Neogastropoda
- Superfamily: Conoidea
- Family: Mangeliidae
- Genus: Oenopota
- Species: O. quadra

Binomial name
- Oenopota quadra (W.H. Dall, 1919)

Synonyms
- Lora quadra Dall, 1919 (original description)

= Oenopota quadra =

Species of gastropod

Oenopota quadra is a species of sea snail, a marine gastropod mollusk in the family Mangeliidae.

== Description ==
The length of the shell attains 8 mm, its diameter 4.5 mm.

(Original description) The short and stout shell is white. It contains about five whorls. The apex is eroded. The suture is distinct,. The anal fasciole is narrow, excavated, and finely spirally striated. The axial sculpture consists of (on the body whorl about 18) stout nearly vertical ribs angulated at the edge of the fasciole, forming a narrow shoulder, but without a limiting cord, with usually narrower interspaces and obsolete on the base. The incremental lines are not conspicuous. The spiral sculpture consists of spiral grooves with much wider flat interspaces. The siphonal canal is constricted, spirally threaded and very short. The aperture is simple. The inner lip is erased.

== Distribution ==
This marine species occurs from the Aleutian Islands to Puget Sound.
