= Oenopota amiata =

Scientific classification
- Kingdom: Animalia
- Phylum: Mollusca
- Class: Gastropoda
- Subclass: Caenogastropoda
- Order: Neogastropoda
- Superfamily: Conoidea
- Family: Mangeliidae
- Genus: Oenopota
- Species: O. amiata

Binomial name
- Oenopota amiata (W. H. Dall, 1919)

Synonyms
- Lora amiata W. H. Dall, 1919 (original description)

Species of gastropod

Oenopota amiata is a species of sea snail, a marine gastropod mollusk in the family Mangeliidae.

== Description ==
The length of the shell attains 15 mm, its diameter 7 mm.

(Original description) The shell is elevated and rugose. its color is white under a pale yellow periostracum. It contains six subtabulate whorls. The protoconch is decorticated,. The suture is obscure and closely appressed. The spiral sculpture consists of an angle at the shoulder, between "v/hich" and the suture are four or five close-set small equal threads. In front of the shoulder is a constriction beyond which are about a dozen deep grooves with wider rounded interspaces which are finely spirally striated. On the siphonal canal there are crowded small threads. The axial sculpture consists of about 15 short ribs extending from the shoulder, which they nodulate, to the periphery only. The aperture is narrow with a shallow anal sulcus. The outer lip thin, the inner lip is erased. The siphonal canal is straight and short

== Distribution ==
This marine species occurs off Belkoffski, Alaska.
