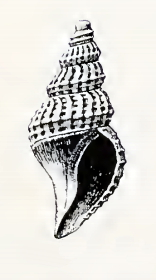
- Original image of a shell of Oenopota maclaini

Scientific classification
- Kingdom: Animalia
- Phylum: Mollusca
- Class: Gastropoda
- Subclass: Caenogastropoda
- Order: Neogastropoda
- Superfamily: Conoidea
- Family: Mangeliidae
- Genus: Oenopota
- Species: O. maclaini

Binomial name
- Oenopota maclaini (Dall, 1902)

Synonyms
- Boreotrophon maclaini Dall, 1902 (original description); Neptunea (Trophonopsis) maclaini (Dall, 1902)

= Oenopota maclaini =

Species of gastropod

Oenopota maclaini is a species of sea snail, a marine gastropod mollusk in the family Mangeliidae.

== Description ==
The length of this rare shell attains 6.5 millimetres (0.26 in), its diameter 3 millimetres (0.12 in). The single specimen obtained is not fully mature and the species doubtless attains a somewhat larger size.

(Original description) The small shell is yellowish white with five or more whorls. The protoconch is tilted, smooth, flat above, with the margin of the plane forming a strong carina which is continued as a spiral thread at the shoulder in the subsequent whorls. The first whorl which follows the protoconch has two spiral threads. The number of these gradually increases until the fifth whorl has thirteen, closer in front of the suture and behind the shoulder and also on the base of the shell. They are less crowded on the peripheir, and crossing (on the fifth whorl twenty) arcuate, regular, slightly elevated ribs with subequal interspaces which extend over the periphery and fade out on the base. The spire is longer than the aperture. The short siphonal canal is straight or slightly recurved. The columella is straight and obliquely truncate in front. The periostracum is yellowish.

== Distribution ==
This marine species occurs off the Baffin Bay, Greenland.
