= Oenopota harveyi =

Scientific classification
- Kingdom: Animalia
- Phylum: Mollusca
- Class: Gastropoda
- Subclass: Caenogastropoda
- Order: Neogastropoda
- Superfamily: Conoidea
- Family: Mangeliidae
- Genus: Oenopota
- Species: O. harveyi

Binomial name
- Oenopota harveyi (T.A. Verkrüzen, 1878)

Synonyms
- Bela harveyi T.A. Verkrüzen, 1878

Species of gastropod

Oenopota harveyi is a species of sea snail, a marine gastropod mollusk in the family Mangeliidae.

This species is considered a nomen dubium.

== Description ==
The shell is slender and wide, displaying fine spiral ridges and a smooth outer surface typical of the genus Oenopota and can attain a length of 6 mm.

== Distribution ==
Originally reported from the waters off Newfoundland, this species has been associated with the subarctic benthic communities of the Northwest Atlantic.
