= Oenopota reticulosculpturata =

Scientific classification
- Kingdom: Animalia
- Phylum: Mollusca
- Class: Gastropoda
- Subclass: Caenogastropoda
- Order: Neogastropoda
- Superfamily: Conoidea
- Family: Mangeliidae
- Genus: Oenopota
- Species: O. reticulosculpturata

Binomial name
- Oenopota reticulosculpturata Sysoev, 1988

Species of gastropod

Oenopota reticulosculpturata is a species of sea snail, a marine gastropod mollusk in the family Mangeliidae.

== Distribution ==
This marine species was found in the Kurile-Kamchatka Trench, Northern Pacific
