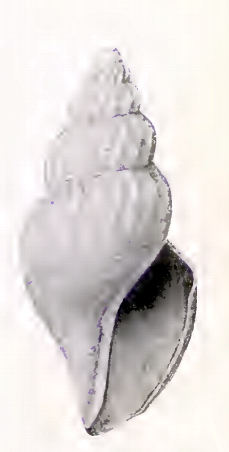
- Original image of a shell of Oenopota pavlova

Scientific classification
- Kingdom: Animalia
- Phylum: Mollusca
- Class: Gastropoda
- Subclass: Caenogastropoda
- Order: Neogastropoda
- Superfamily: Conoidea
- Family: Mangeliidae
- Genus: Oenopota
- Species: O. pavlova

Binomial name
- Oenopota pavlova (W. H. Dall, 1919)

Synonyms
- Lora pavlova W. H. Dall, 1919 (original description); Nodotoma pavlova (W. H. Dall, 1919)

= Oenopota pavlova =

Species of gastropod

Oenopota pavlova is a species of sea snail, a marine gastropod mollusk in the family Mangeliidae.

== Description ==
The length of the shell varies between 7.5 mm and 20 mm.

(Original description) The white shell is thin and delicate. It contains six or more whorls, the protoconch eroded. The spiral sculpture consists of fine striae with wider flat interspaces minutely cut into segments by close regular incremental lines. The whorls are subangulate at the shoulder. The axial sculpture consists of sharp, sigmoid riblets (22 or more on the penultimate whorl) obsolete on the base and on most of the body whorl. The anal sulcus is wide and shallow. The aperture is simple. The inner lip is erased.

== Distribution ==
This marine species was found off the Pribilof Islands, Bering Sea
