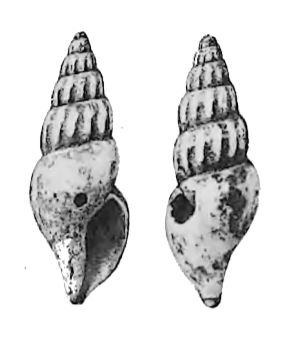
- Image of a shell of Oenopota pyramidalis

Scientific classification
- Kingdom: Animalia
- Phylum: Mollusca
- Class: Gastropoda
- Subclass: Caenogastropoda
- Order: Neogastropoda
- Superfamily: Conoidea
- Family: Mangeliidae
- Genus: Oenopota
- Species: O. pyramidalis

Binomial name
- Oenopota pyramidalis (Ström, 1788)

Synonyms
- Bela pyramidalis (Ström, 1788); Bela pyramidalis var. semiplicata Sars G.O., 1878; Bela pyramidalis var. valdeplicosa Posselt, H.J., 1898; Buccinum pyramidale Ström, 1788; Buccinum pyramidalis Strom, 1788; Defrancia vahli Møller, 1842; Fusus discors Brown, C.T., 1827; Fusus pleurotomarius Couthouy, 1838; Lora (Bela) pleurotomaria (Couthouy, 1838); Lora halitropa Dall, W.H., 1919; Lora pleurotomaria (Couthouy, 1838); Murex rufus Montagu, G., 1841; Oenopota discors T. Brown, 1827; Oenopota pleurotomaria J.P.Y. Couthouy, 1838; Oenopota rufus G. Montagu, 1841; Pleurotoma pyramidalis (Strøm, 1788); Pleurotoma pyramidalis var. jenisseensis Leche, 1878

= Oenopota pyramidalis =

Species of gastropod

Oenopota pyramidalis, common name the pyramid lora, is a species of sea snail, a marine gastropod mollusk in the family Mangeliidae.

== Description ==
The length of the shell varies between 10 mm and 23.5 mm.

The shell has usually a rather high spire with seven or eight tolerably convex whorls, scarcely or not at all shouldered. It shows 13 to 16 sigmoid ribs, fading out about or above the middle of the body whorl. There are numerous, fine, close revolving lines, sometimes not apparent on the ribs. The color of the shell is pale chestnut, when fresh. The species varies considerably in the elevation of the spire and in ther stoutness, as well as in the development of the ribs.

== Distribution ==
This species occurs in European waters, the Northwest Atlantic Ocean, the Arctic waters of Canada, the Gulf of Maine. Fossils have been found in Quaternary strata of Iceland (age range: 0.126 to 0.012 Ma).
