= Oenopota rubescens =

Scientific classification
- Kingdom: Animalia
- Phylum: Mollusca
- Class: Gastropoda
- Subclass: Caenogastropoda
- Order: Neogastropoda
- Superfamily: Conoidea
- Family: Mangeliidae
- Genus: Oenopota
- Species: O. rubescens

Binomial name
- Oenopota rubescens (Jeffreys, 1876)

Synonyms
- ? Bela rufescens (Jeffreys, 1876); Pleurotoma rubescens Jeffreys, 1876

Species of gastropod

Oenopota rubescens is a species of sea snail, a marine gastropod mollusk in the family Mangeliidae,.

== Description ==
(Original description) The oval shell is solid, opaque, of a dull hue. The sculpture, rather strong, is rounded but sharp and curved longitudinal ribs, which on the body whorl extend to the suture and reach rather more than halfway down. There are twelve on each of the last two whorls. The whole surface is covered with numerous fine, irregular, impressed spiral striae, which cross the ribs. The uppermost whorls are fretted. The colour of the shell is pale purplish red. The spire is short, ending in a somewhat abrupt and blunt point. The shell contains 5–6 whorls, convex, regularly increasing. The body whorl occupies about three-fifths of the shell. The suture is deep. The aperture is oval and rather wide. Its length rather exceeds one half that of the shell. The siphonal canal is short, wide and nearly straight. The outer lip is flexuous, slightly incurved, with a sharp edg. The labial notch is shallow and indistinct, placed near the top of the body whorl. The inner lip is broad, somewhat excavated and polished. The columella is flexuous.

The body is yellowish white. The tentacles are short. The small eyes are on stalks which are united with the tentacles. The foot is long, squarish and double-edged in front, rounded behind. The canalfold is short. The operculum is small, ear-shaped, and elongated.

== Distribution ==
This marine species occurs off Western Greenland.
