= Oenopota cunninghami =

Scientific classification
- Kingdom: Animalia
- Phylum: Mollusca
- Class: Gastropoda
- Subclass: Caenogastropoda
- Order: Neogastropoda
- Superfamily: Conoidea
- Family: Mangeliidae
- Genus: Oenopota
- Species: O. cunninghami

Binomial name
- Oenopota cunninghami (Smith, E.A., 1881)

Synonyms
- Belalora thielei Powell, A.W.B., 1951; Oenopota thielei Powell, 1951

Species of gastropod

Oenopota cunninghami is a species of sea snail, a marine gastropod mollusk in the family Mangeliidae.

== Description ==
The size of the shell varies between 6 mm and 10 mm.

== Distribution ==
This species occurs off the Falkland Islands, Argentina and Chile.
