= Oenopota multicostata =

Scientific classification
- Kingdom: Animalia
- Phylum: Mollusca
- Class: Gastropoda
- Subclass: Caenogastropoda
- Order: Neogastropoda
- Superfamily: Conoidea
- Family: Mangeliidae
- Genus: Oenopota
- Species: O. multicostata

Binomial name
- Oenopota multicostata (T.A. Verkrüzen, 1878)

Synonyms
- Bela multicostata Verkrüzen, 1878

Species of gastropod

Oenopota multicostata is a species of sea snail, a marine gastropod mollusk in the family Conidae, the cone snails and their allies.

This species is considered a nomen dubium.

== Description ==
The length of the shell attains 12 mm.

== Distribution ==
This marine species was found in the Annapolis Basin, Bay of Fundy; Nova Scotia, Canada.
