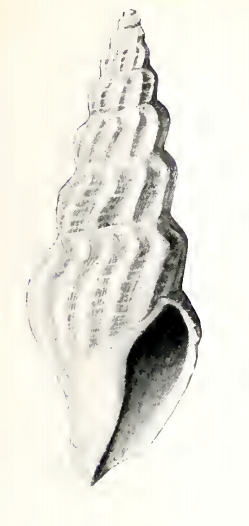
- Original image of a shell of Oenopota eriopis

Scientific classification
- Kingdom: Animalia
- Phylum: Mollusca
- Class: Gastropoda
- Subclass: Caenogastropoda
- Order: Neogastropoda
- Superfamily: Conoidea
- Family: Mangeliidae
- Genus: Oenopota
- Species: O. eriopis

Binomial name
- Oenopota eriopis (W. H. Dall, 1919)

Synonyms
- Mangelia eriopis W. H. Dall, 1919 (original description)

= Oenopota eriopis =

Species of gastropod

Oenopota eriopis is a species of sea snail, a marine gastropod mollusk in the family Mangeliidae.

== Description ==
The length of the shell attains 13.5 mm, its diameter 5 mm.

(Original description) The small shell is white and polished. The protoconch has an oblique smooth small apex and about one whorl, the latter part spirally striated. It has about 6½ subsequent whorls. The spire is acute and slender. The whorls are moderately rounded. The suture is distinct, not appressed. The spiral sculpture consists of a few obscure threads on the back of the siphonal canal and on the apical whorls. The axial sculpture consists of (on the body whorl about 15) sigmoid ribs, most prominent at the shoulder, feeble over the anal fasciole and on the base. The aperture is narrowly ovate. The anal sulcus is shallow and wide, beginning at the suture. The outer lip is produced, thin and sharp. The inner lip and the columella show a thin wash of enamel. The columella is straight and attenuated in front. The siphonal canal is short and narrow.

== Distribution ==
This marine species was found off Forrester Island, southeastern Alaska, USA.
