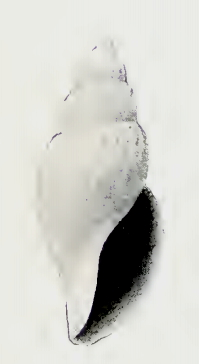
- Original image of a shell of Oenopota tenuissima

Scientific classification
- Kingdom: Animalia
- Phylum: Mollusca
- Class: Gastropoda
- Subclass: Caenogastropoda
- Order: Neogastropoda
- Superfamily: Conoidea
- Family: Mangeliidae
- Genus: Oenopota
- Species: O. tenuissima

Binomial name
- Oenopota tenuissima (W.H. Dall, 1919)

Synonyms
- Lora tenuissima W.H. Dall, 1919 (original description)

= Oenopota tenuissima =

Species of gastropod

Oenopota tenuissima is a species of sea snail, a marine gastropod mollusk in the family Mangeliidae.

== Description ==
The length of the shell attains 15 mm, its diameter 6 mm.

(Original description) The thin, white shell is fragile and acute. It contains about six whorls, the protoconch whorl eroded. The suture is distinct. The whorls are evenly rounded. The spiral sculpture consists of fine even equal close-set minute threads covering the whole surface. The axial sculpture consists of almost microscopic, even, regular incremental lines, and on the third whorl about 16 small sharp ribs crossing the whorl, with wider interspaces and becoming obsolete on the fourth whorl. The anal sulcus is shallow. The aperture is simple. The inner lip erased. The columella is attenuated in front. The siphonal canal is short and straight.

== Distribution ==
This marine species was found off Unalaska Island, Alaska, USA.
