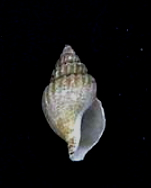
- Shell of Oenopota elegans (museum specimen at Naturalis Biodiversity Center)

Scientific classification
- Kingdom: Animalia
- Phylum: Mollusca
- Class: Gastropoda
- Subclass: Caenogastropoda
- Order: Neogastropoda
- Superfamily: Conoidea
- Family: Mangeliidae
- Genus: Oenopota
- Species: O. elegans

Binomial name
- Oenopota elegans (Møller, 1842)

Synonyms
- Defrancia elegans Møller, 1842 (original description); Lora elegans; Lora galgana Dall, W. H., 1919; Lora sixta Dall, W. H. in Simpson, C.T., 1919; Nodotoma elegans (Møller, H.P.C., 1842); Oenopota galgana W. H. Dall, 1919; Oenopota sixta W. H. Dall in C.T. Simpson, 1919; Pleurotomoides elegans H.P.C. Møller, 1842

= Oenopota elegans =

Species of gastropod

Oenopota elegans is a species of sea snail, a marine gastropod mollusk in the family Mangeliidae.

== Description ==
The length of the shell varies between 10 mm and 18 mm, its diameter 6 mm.

The shell is white, under a yellowish periostracum. It contains six or more obtusely shouldered whorls. The apex is decorticated. The suture is appressed. The axial sculpture consists on the earlier whorls of about 18 protractively oblique rounded ribs, slightly angulate at the shoulder, feeble on the fasciole and crossing the whorls except on the body whorl where they gradually become obsolete. The whole surface is spirally sculptured with fine close-set threads, here and there one a little more prominent than the rest, others near the siphonal canal coarser. The anal sulcus is wide and shallow. The outer lip is arcuate. The inner lip is erased. The siphonal canal is moderately long and slightly recurved.

== Distribution ==
This marine species is circumarctic and also occurs in European waters, the northwestern Atlantic Ocean, and the Gulf of Maine.
