= Oenopota althorpensis =

Scientific classification
- Kingdom: Animalia
- Phylum: Mollusca
- Class: Gastropoda
- Subclass: Caenogastropoda
- Order: Neogastropoda
- Superfamily: Conoidea
- Family: Mangeliidae
- Genus: Oenopota
- Species: O. althorpensis

Binomial name
- Oenopota althorpensis (W.H. Dall, 1919)

Synonyms
- Lora althorpensis W.H. Dall, 1919 (original description)

Species of gastropod

Oenopota althorpensis is a species of sea snail, a marine gastropod mollusk in the family Mangeliidae.

== Description ==
The length of the shell attains 6.5 mm, its diameter 2.5 mm.

(Original description) The small shell is waxen yellow and coarsely sculptured. It consists of about six whorls, including one smooth whorl in the protoconch. The suture is distinct. The anal fasciole is obscure. The anal sulcus is very feeble. The spiral sculpture on the early whorls consists of two strong rows of nodules on the ribs. The cords connecting them are less conspicuous. On the body whorl there are about 14 cords, but only that at the shoulder is conspicuous. The interspaces are narrower with an occasional intercalary thread. The axial sculpture consists of (on the penultimate whorl about 20) narrow nearly vertical ribs with subequal interspaces reticulating the spirals, with deep interstices, but on the body whorl becoming obsolete. The aperture is narrow. The inner lip is erased. The siphonal canal is short and straight.

== Distribution ==
This marine species occurs off Alaska, found at Port Althorp.
