= Oenopota dubia =

Scientific classification
- Kingdom: Animalia
- Phylum: Mollusca
- Class: Gastropoda
- Subclass: Caenogastropoda
- Order: Neogastropoda
- Superfamily: Conoidea
- Family: Mangeliidae
- Genus: Oenopota
- Species: O. dubia

Binomial name
- Oenopota dubia Golikov & Scarlato, 1985

Species of gastropod

Oenopota dubia is a species of sea snail, a marine gastropod mollusk in the family Mangeliidae.

== Distribution ==
This marine species occurs off Sakhalin, Eastern Russia
