= Oenopota dictyophora =

Scientific classification
- Kingdom: Animalia
- Phylum: Mollusca
- Class: Gastropoda
- Subclass: Caenogastropoda
- Order: Neogastropoda
- Superfamily: Conoidea
- Family: Mangeliidae
- Genus: Oenopota
- Species: O. dictyophora

Binomial name
- Oenopota dictyophora Bouchet & Warén, 1980

Species of gastropod

Oenopota dictyophora is a species of sea snail, a marine gastropod mollusc in the family Mangeliidae.

== Description ==
The length of the shell attains 9.1 mm.

== Distribution ==
This species occurs in European waters off the British Isles and in the Bay of Biscay.
