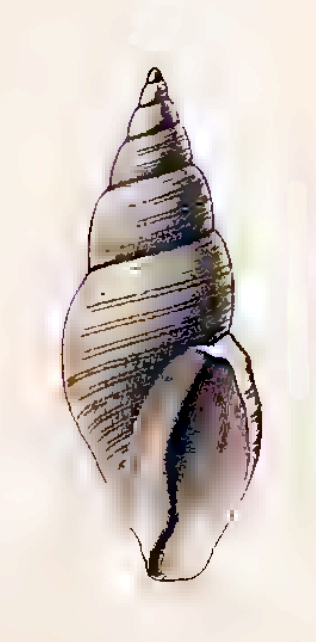
- Image of a shell of Oenopota violacea

Scientific classification
- Kingdom: Animalia
- Phylum: Mollusca
- Class: Gastropoda
- Subclass: Caenogastropoda
- Order: Neogastropoda
- Superfamily: Conoidea
- Family: Mangeliidae
- Genus: Oenopota
- Species: O. violacea

Binomial name
- Oenopota violacea (Mighels & Adams, 1842)

Synonyms
- Bela bicarinata rufescens G.O. Sars, 1878; Bela brevior Mörch, O.A.L. in Rink, 1857; Bela expansa Sars, G.O., 1878; Bela minuscularia Locard, E.A.A., 1897; Defrancia beckii Møller, H.P.C., 1842; Defrancia cylindracea Møller, H.P.C., 1842; Defrancia livida Møller, H.P.C., 1842; Oenopota beckii H.P.C. Møller, 1842; Oenopota bicarinata H.B.S. Friele, 1879; Oenopota bicarinata (G.O. Sars, 1878); Oenopota bicarinata (var) gemminolineata Friele, H., 1879; Oenopota brevior (O.A.L. Mörch in H.J. Rink, 1857); Oenopota brevis W. Leche, 1878; Oenopota cylindracea (H.P.C. Møller, 1842); Oenopota expansa (G.O. Sars, 1878); Oenopota exserta C.W.S. Aurivillius, 1885; Oenopota geminolineata (H.B.S. Friele, 1879); Oenopota livida (H.P.C. Møller, 1842); Oenopota minuscularia (É.A.A. Locard, 1897); Oenopota nodulosa A. Krause, 1886; Oenopota rufescens G.O. Sars, 1878; Oenopota ventricosa O.A.L. Mörch, 1857; Pleurotoma bicarinata Couthouy, J.P., 1838

= Oenopota violacea =

Species of gastropod

Oenopota violacea is a species of sea snail, a marine gastropod mollusk in the family Mangeliidae.

== Description ==
It is extremely difficult to characterise this species, because both its form and sculpture are more variable than in any other of the whole genus. Sometimes the form is oval, with the spire about the same length as the aperture, and sometimes it is fusiform, with a long, strongly acuminate spire. The whorls are sometimes angulated and sometimes cylindrically rounded. The sculpture is, often, by far the most prominent in the axial direction, and often, it is so transversally. The typical shell has, thus, very prominent spiral ribs devoid of other sculpture than lines of growth, whilst the varieties violacea and cylindracea, frequently, have quite prominent axial ribs, and these are invariably – even if they only occur as lines of growth – curved. The most characteristic feature is the, not very long, cauda, and the deep wide siphonal canal. The apex gives no assistance as a specific feature, because it varies according to the sculptural character of the shell.

The shell of the variety gemminolineata is fusiform. The spire is strongly acuminate, and longer than the aperture. The axial sculpture consists of, only faint lines of growth, whilst the spiral sculpture consists of lines occurring in pairs. In the penultimate whorl there are 4 pairs of such lines.

== Distribution ==
This species occurs in Northeast Atlantic Ocean and off the British Isles at depths between 80 m and 505 m
