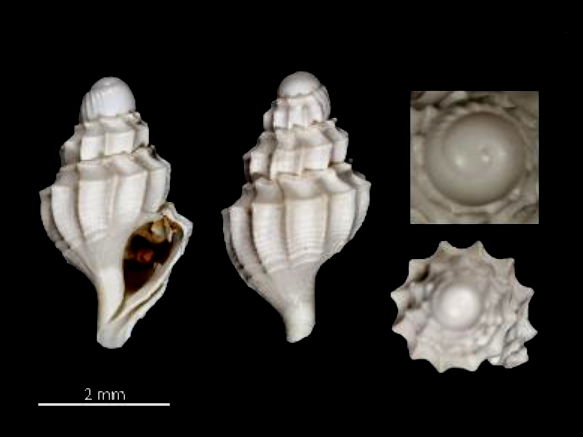
- Shells of Oenopota diabula (museum specimens at MNHN)

Scientific classification
- Kingdom: Animalia
- Phylum: Mollusca
- Class: Gastropoda
- Subclass: Caenogastropoda
- Order: Neogastropoda
- Superfamily: Conoidea
- Family: Mangeliidae
- Genus: Oenopota
- Species: O. diabula

Binomial name
- Oenopota diabula Figueira & Absalão, 2010

= Oenopota diabula =

Species of gastropod

Oenopota diabula is a species of sea snail, a marine gastropod mollusk in the family Mangeliidae.

== Description ==
Oenopota diabula has a short, white shell reaching up to 7.2 mm in length with approximately 3½ whorls. The protoconch consists of a single, smooth, dome-shaped whorl that is white in color, with faint axial riblets appearing on the final quarter whorl.

The teleoconch whorls show a slightly concave area between the suture and the shoulder. Spiral sculpture includes a prominent thin cord along the shoulder, a weaker subsutural cord, and several fine threads on the lower portion of each whorl. On the body whorl, from the shoulder to the fasciolar region, there are about 16 to 20 spiral threads.

Axial sculpture is made up of roughly 16 thin, straight (orthocline) ribs. These ribs form small, sharp nodules where they intersect the spiral cords at the shoulder and just below the suture. They continue across the base but gradually fade toward the inner lip. The suture is moderately deep.

The base is short and convex, curving inward to form the fasciolar region. There is no labial sinus. The inner lip is thin and slightly reflected over the parietal wall, while the outer lip is also thin. The siphonal canal is broad and moderately short, and the aperture is elliptical in shape.

== Distribution ==
This marine species occurs in the Atlantic Ocean off the Campos Basin, southeast Brazil.
