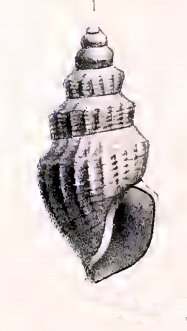
- Original image of a shell of Oenopota graphica

Scientific classification
- Kingdom: Animalia
- Phylum: Mollusca
- Class: Gastropoda
- Subclass: Caenogastropoda
- Order: Neogastropoda
- Superfamily: Conoidea
- Family: Mangeliidae
- Genus: Oenopota
- Species: O. graphica

Binomial name
- Oenopota graphica (Locard, 1897)

Synonyms
- Bela graphica Locard, 1897; Bela graphica var. ventricosa Locard, 1897; Oenopota monterosatoi É.A.A. Locard, 1897; Taranis monterosatoi Locard, 1897

= Oenopota graphica =

Species of gastropod

Oenopota graphica is a species of sea snail, a marine gastropod mollusk in the family Mangeliidae.

== Description ==
The length of the shell attains 6.5 mm. The distinctive characteristics of this species are a short aperture and shouldered whorls. There is also a considerable and continuous variation in the broadness of the shell between the sites of distribution.

== Distribution ==
This species occurs in the Atlantic Ocean off Portugal and Morocco at depths between 700 m and 2091 m.
