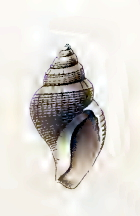
- Image of a shell of Oenopota schantaricum

Scientific classification
- Kingdom: Animalia
- Phylum: Mollusca
- Class: Gastropoda
- Subclass: Caenogastropoda
- Order: Neogastropoda
- Superfamily: Conoidea
- Family: Mangeliidae
- Genus: Oenopota
- Species: O. schantaricum

Binomial name
- Oenopota schantaricum (Middendorf, 1849)

Synonyms
- Bela schantarica (Middendorff, 1849); Obesotoma schantarica (Middendorff, 1849); Pleurotoma schantaricum Middendorf, 1849 (original combination); Pleurotoma violacea var. gigantea (Mørch) Leche

= Oenopota schantaricum =

Species of gastropod

Oenopota schantaricum is a species of sea snail, a marine gastropod mollusk in the family Mangeliidae.

== Description ==
The length of the shell varies between 20 mm and 30 mm. The shell has an ovo-fusiform shape. The whorls are tumid, occasionally faintly angulated, occasionally rounded (most frequently the body whorl). The aperture is longer than the spire and not much dilated. The siphonal canal is short and wide. The sculpture consists of fine, close, undulated spiral striae and axial folds, which, in adult specimens, often, almost disappear on the ultimate whorl, whilst they, invariably, are recognised on the upper whorls.

The teeth in the radula are ensiform with a short manubrium.

== Distribution ==
This marine species occurs off Japan and in the Okhotsk Sea
