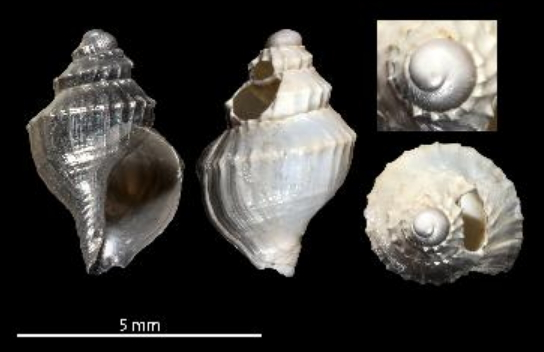
- Shells of Oenopota seraphina (museum specimens at MNHN)

Scientific classification
- Kingdom: Animalia
- Phylum: Mollusca
- Class: Gastropoda
- Subclass: Caenogastropoda
- Order: Neogastropoda
- Superfamily: Conoidea
- Family: Mangeliidae
- Genus: Oenopota
- Species: O. seraphina

Binomial name
- Oenopota seraphina Figueira & Absalão, 2010

= Oenopota seraphina =

Species of gastropod

Oenopota seraphina is a species of sea snail within the family Mangeliidae. This marine Gastropod was first described in 2010 by researchers R.M.A. Figueira and R.S. Absalão.

== Description ==
The shell of Oenopota seraphina varies in length between 3.5 mm and 5 mm. Detailed morphological characteristics, such as shell sculpture and coloration, were outlined in the original species description by Figueira and Absalão.

== Distribution ==
This species is found in the Atlantic Ocean, specifically off the Campos Basin in southeast Brazil. Specimens have been collected at depths around 750 meters.
