= Oenopota subturgida =

Scientific classification
- Kingdom: Animalia
- Phylum: Mollusca
- Class: Gastropoda
- Subclass: Caenogastropoda
- Order: Neogastropoda
- Superfamily: Conoidea
- Family: Mangeliidae
- Genus: Oenopota
- Species: O. subturgida

Binomial name
- Oenopota subturgida (A. E. Verrill, 1884)

Synonyms
- Bela subturgida A.E. Verrill, 1884 (original combination); Propebela subturgida (A. E. Verrill, 1884)

Species of gastropod

Oenopota subturgida is a species of sea snail, a marine gastropod mollusk in the family Mangeliidae.

== Description ==
The length of the shell attains 9 mm, its diameter 5 mm.

(Original description) The white, translucent shell is of moderate size, stout-fusiform, with swollen, angulated whorls, and a distinctly turreted, rapidly tapering spire. The sculpture consists of rather distant ribs and much finer spiral cinguli. The largest specimen, which is probably immature, has four whorls below the protoconch. The three upper whorls are abruptly angularly shouldered, the portion forming the subsutural band rising nearly at right angles to the shoulder. Below the whorls are flattened and strongly ribbed by about sixteen prominent, rather narrow, obtuse, nearly straight ribs, which rise into angular points or small, obtuse nodules at the shoulder. The interspaces are wider than the ribs and strongly concave. The ribs and interspaces also extend across the subsutural band to the suture, becoming small above the shoulder. The whole surface is covered by rather slender revolving cinguli, in the form of thin, raised lines, which are most conspicuous in the interspaces and more or less obsolete on the ribs. On the subsutural band the spiral lines are finer and closer, and often indistinct toward the suture, but on the anterior part of the body whorl they become somewhat coarser and wider apart. The body whorl is much swollen and has the shoulder somewhat rounded, while on the upper whorls there is often a distinct carina at the shoulder. The protoconch is small and prominent, smooth, and consists of about1½ whorls, of which the apical is turned up obliquely and incurved. The aperture is ovate, broadly rounded externally, and more strongly excavated at the base of the columella. The siphonal canal is a little elongated, narrow, constricted at the base by the incurvature of the outer lip, and with the opening oblique, owing to the form of the columella margin, but not bent. The columella is nearly straight, its inner margin forming a well-marked sigmoid curve, and strongly obliquely twisted at the anterior end.

== Distribution ==
This marine species occurs off North Carolina, United States.
