= Oenopota kurilensis =

Scientific classification
- Kingdom: Animalia
- Phylum: Mollusca
- Class: Gastropoda
- Subclass: Caenogastropoda
- Order: Neogastropoda
- Superfamily: Conoidea
- Family: Mangeliidae
- Genus: Oenopota
- Species: O. kurilensis

Binomial name
- Oenopota kurilensis Bogdanov, 1989

Synonyms
- Nodotoma kurilensis (Bogdanov, 1989)

Species of gastropod

Oenopota kurilensis is a species of sea snail, a marine gastropod mollusk in the family Mangeliidae.

== Description ==
The length of the shell varies between 9 mm and 45 mm. Members of the order Neogastropoda are mostly gonochoric and broadcast spawners. Life cycle: Embryos develop into planktonic trochophore larvae and later into juvenile veligers before becoming fully grown adults.

== Distribution ==
This species occurs in the Okhotsk Sea and in the Arctic Ocean.
