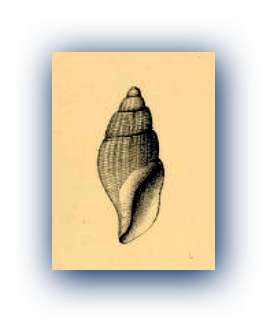
- Original image of a shell of Oenopota lutkeana

Scientific classification
- Kingdom: Animalia
- Phylum: Mollusca
- Class: Gastropoda
- Subclass: Caenogastropoda
- Order: Neogastropoda
- Superfamily: Conoidea
- Family: Mangeliidae
- Genus: Oenopota
- Species: O. lutkeana

Binomial name
- Oenopota lutkeana (Krause, 1886)

Synonyms
- Bela lütkeana Krause, 1886 (original combination); Lora lutkeana (Krause, 1886)

= Oenopota lutkeana =

Species of gastropod

Oenopota lutkeana is a species of sea snail, a marine gastropod mollusk in the family Mangeliidae.

== Description ==
The length of this rare shell attains 12 mm, its diameter 5.5 mm.

The brownish shell has an ovate-fusiform shape. It contains 6 whorls with the spire scarcely angulate next to the suture. The sculpture consists of numerous longitudinal lines and 18–20 spiral plications. These are little prominent divided as it were in the middle above a longitudinal line and reaching the line in the last whorl.

== Distribution ==
This marine species occurs in the St. Lawrence Bay, Bering Strait
