= Oenopota kakumensis =

Scientific classification
- Kingdom: Animalia
- Phylum: Mollusca
- Class: Gastropoda
- Subclass: Caenogastropoda
- Order: Neogastropoda
- Superfamily: Conoidea
- Family: Mangeliidae
- Genus: Oenopota
- Species: O. kakumensis

Binomial name
- Oenopota kakumensis (N. Onoyama, 1938)

Synonyms
- † Lora kakumensis N. Onoyama, 1938

Extinct species of gastropod

Oenopota kakumensis is an extinct species of sea snail, a marine gastropod mollusk in the family Mangeliidae.

== Distribution ==
This extinct marine species was found in Tertiary strata in the Isikawa and Toyama Prefectures, Japan
