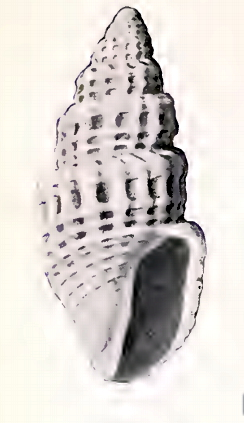
- Image of a shell of Oenopota tabulata

Scientific classification
- Kingdom: Animalia
- Phylum: Mollusca
- Class: Gastropoda
- Subclass: Caenogastropoda
- Order: Neogastropoda
- Superfamily: Conoidea
- Family: Mangeliidae
- Genus: Oenopota
- Species: O. tabulata

Binomial name
- Oenopota tabulata (Carpenter, 1864)

Synonyms
- Daphnella tabulata (Carpenter, 1864); Lora tabulata (Carpenter, 1864); Mangelia tabulata Carpenter, 1864

= Oenopota tabulata =

Species of gastropod

Oenopota tabulata is a species of sea snail, a marine gastropod mollusk in the family Mangeliidae.

== Description ==
The length of the shell attains 11 mm, its diameter 5 mm.

The small, stout shell is strongly shouldered and coarsely cancellated. The color of the shell is a dull dark-red. The shell contains five whorls. These are rectangularly tabulated. The suture is impressed. The shell shows about 16 longitudinal, obtuse ribs These become almost obsolete at the base of the shell. The spiral sculpture consists of about 3–4 narrow ribs on each whorl. The crossings with the longitudinal ribs are nodose. The subquadratic interstices are deeply impressed. The siphonal canal is short and open. The outer lip is sharp and slightly sinuate at the posterior end. The columella is abnormally twisted. In fully adult specimens there is sometimes a thickening near the anterior end of the columella which in some individuals approaches a fold, but is not carried into the interior on the columella.

== Distribution ==
This marine species occurs from Sitka, Alaska, to Monterey, California, USA.
