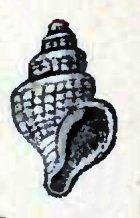
- Drawing of a shell of Oenopota impressa

Scientific classification
- Kingdom: Animalia
- Phylum: Mollusca
- Class: Gastropoda
- Subclass: Caenogastropoda
- Order: Neogastropoda
- Superfamily: Conoidea
- Family: Mangeliidae
- Genus: Oenopota
- Species: O. impressa

Binomial name
- Oenopota impressa (Mørch, 1869)

Synonyms
- Bela cancellata Mighels & Adams, 1842 sensu G. O. Sars, 1878 (misidentification); Bela impressa Leche, 1886; Bela sarsii Verrill, 1880; Lora impressa (Mørch, 1869); Nodotoma impressa (Beck, H.H. in Mörch, O.A.L., 1869); Oenopota impressus (Mørch, 1869); Pleurotoma (Ischnula) impressa Mørch, 1869 (original description)

= Oenopota impressa =

Species of gastropod

Oenopota impressa is a species of sea snail, a marine gastropod mollusk in the family Mangeliidae.

Pleurotoma impressa Mørch, 1869 is the type species of Nodotoma Bartsch, 1941

== Description ==
The length of the shell varies between 6 mm and 14 mm.

The wide shell has a short spire and sloping but rather well-defined shoulder. It is densely costulate longitudinally, crossed by about ten spiral riblets, forming a cancellated surface. Its color is a yellowish ash.

== Distribution ==
This species occurs in European waters and in the Northwest Atlantic Ocean (Spitzbergen, Nova Zembla); in the Arctic Ocean, near the Seahorse Islands, south to the Aleutians and eastward to St. Paul, Kodiak Island, Alaska.
