= Oenopota kinkasanensis =

Scientific classification
- Kingdom: Animalia
- Phylum: Mollusca
- Class: Gastropoda
- Subclass: Caenogastropoda
- Order: Neogastropoda
- Superfamily: Conoidea
- Family: Mangeliidae
- Genus: Oenopota
- Species: O. kinkasanensis

Binomial name
- Oenopota kinkasanensis Golikov & Gulbin, 1977

Synonyms
- Nematoma kinkasanensis P. Bartsch in A.N. Golikov & V.V. Gulbin, 1977

Species of gastropod

Oenopota kinkasanensis is a species of sea snail, a marine gastropod mollusk in the family Mangeliidae.

== Distribution ==
This marine species occurs off the Kurile Islands, Russia.
