= Oenopota convexigyra =

Scientific classification
- Kingdom: Animalia
- Phylum: Mollusca
- Class: Gastropoda
- Subclass: Caenogastropoda
- Order: Neogastropoda
- Superfamily: Conoidea
- Family: Mangeliidae
- Genus: Oenopota
- Species: O. convexigyra

Binomial name
- Oenopota convexigyra Bouchet & Warén, 1980

Species of gastropod

Oenopota convexigyra is a species of sea snail, a marine gastropod mollusk in the family Mangeliidae.

== Distribution ==
This species occurs in European waters off the Azores at depths of 3360 m.
