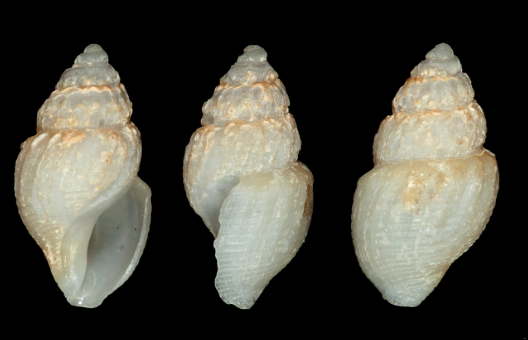
- Shell of Oenopota excurvata (holotype at the Smithsonian Institution)

Scientific classification
- Kingdom: Animalia
- Phylum: Mollusca
- Class: Gastropoda
- Subclass: Caenogastropoda
- Order: Neogastropoda
- Superfamily: Conoidea
- Family: Mangeliidae
- Genus: Oenopota
- Species: O. excurvata

Binomial name
- Oenopota excurvata (Carpenter, 1864)

Synonyms
- Bela excurvata Carpenter, 1864 (original description); Lora excurvata (Carpenter, 1864)

= Oenopota excurvata =

Species of gastropod

Oenopota excurvata is a species of sea snail, a marine gastropod mollusk in the family Mangeliidae.

== Description ==
The length of the shell attains 10 mm, its diameter is 3.8 mm. The characteristics are similar to Curtitoma trevelliana (Turton, 1834) except for the white color, being shorter and the margins of the whorls being more curved.

== Distribution ==
This species occurs from the Bering Sea to the Salish Sea, North America.
