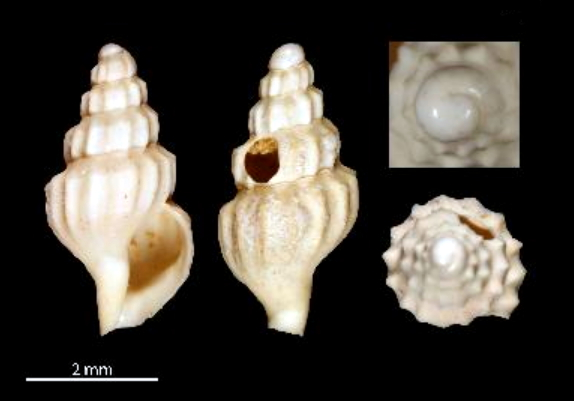
- Shells of Oenopota carioca (museum specimens at MNHN)

Scientific classification
- Kingdom: Animalia
- Phylum: Mollusca
- Class: Gastropoda
- Subclass: Caenogastropoda
- Order: Neogastropoda
- Superfamily: Conoidea
- Family: Mangeliidae
- Genus: Oenopota
- Species: O. carioca

Binomial name
- Oenopota carioca Figueira & Absalão, 2010

= Oenopota carioca =

Species of gastropod

Oenopota carioca is a species of sea snail, a marine gastropod mollusk in the family Mangeliidae.

== Description ==
The shell is white and smooth with length varying between 2 mm and 5 mm(4.5 whorls). The protoconch consists of one whorl and the teleoconch whorls with a concave region between the suture and the shoulder. The axial structure contains 14 ribs located on the 3rd whorl forming nodules on the shoulder that fade away as you approach the suture.

== Distribution ==
This marine species occurs in the Atlantic Ocean off the Campos Basin, southeast Brazil at a depth of 698-1050m
