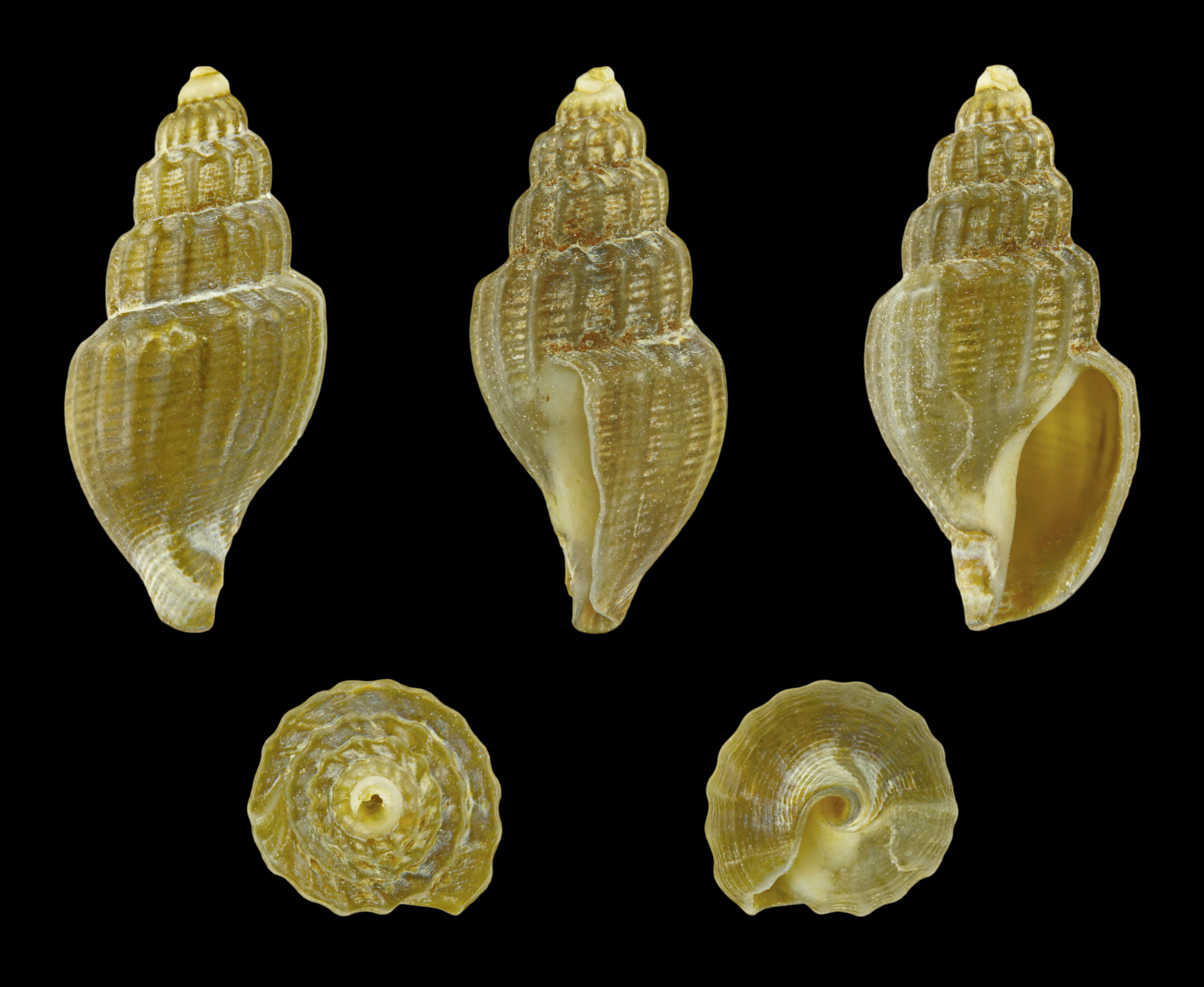
- Shells of Propebela turricula

Scientific classification
- Kingdom: Animalia
- Phylum: Mollusca
- Class: Gastropoda
- Subclass: Caenogastropoda
- Order: Neogastropoda
- Family: Mangeliidae
- Genus: Propebela
- Species: P. turricula

Binomial name
- Propebela turricula (Montagu, 1803)

Synonyms
- Bela turricola [sic] (misspelling); Bela turricula (Montagu, 1803); Bela turricula var. ecostata Norman, 1899; Bela turriculata Locard, 1891; Buccinum minutum Adams, J., 1797; Fusus turricula (Montagu, 1803); Lora turricula (following genus synonymy); Lora turricula (Montagu, 1803); Mangelia turricula (Montagu, 1803); Murex angulatus Donovan, 1804 (dubious synonym); Murex turricula Montagu, 1803; Oenopota turricula (Montagu, 1803); Pleurotoma angulata Donovan, E., 1804; Pleurotoma castanea Brown, C.T., 1827; Pleurotoma turricula (Montagu, 1803); Propebela turricula rosea Mörch, O.A.L., 1871 (nomen nudum); Tritonium turricula (Montagu, 1803); Turbo albus Pennant, T., 1777

= Propebela turricula =

Species of gastropod

Propebela turricula, common name the turreted conelet, is a species of sea snail, a marine gastropod mollusk in the family Mangeliidae.

== Description ==
The length of the shell varies between 12 mm and 18 mm.

The narrow shell is turriculated with acute shoulders and with the ribs strongly projecting above it and then running across to the sutures. The ribs number about sixteen, nearly straight, prominent, crossed by very close, rather fine revolving striae. The aperture is rather narrow. The siphonal canal is narrow and produced.

== Distribution ==
This marine species has an circumarctic distribution, down to Massachusetts, United States; from the Bering Sea to Washington, United States. Fossils have been found in Pliocene strata of the United Kingdom and in Quaternary of Canada and the United Kingdom.
