= Oenopota granitica =

Scientific classification
- Kingdom: Animalia
- Phylum: Mollusca
- Class: Gastropoda
- Subclass: Caenogastropoda
- Order: Neogastropoda
- Superfamily: Conoidea
- Family: Mangeliidae
- Genus: Oenopota
- Species: O. granitica

Binomial name
- Oenopota granitica (W.H. Dall, 1919)

Synonyms
- Mangilia granitica W.H. Dall, 1919 (original description)

Species of gastropod

Oenopota granitica is a species of sea snail, a marine gastropod mollusk in the family Mangeliidae.

== Description ==
The length of the shell attains 13 mm, its diameter 5 mm.

(Original description) The small shell is waxen white, darker on the columella. The protoconch has 2 whorls followed by about five subsequent whorls. The protoconch is flat-topped, the first whorl with one strong keel, the second with three. The suture is laid on the anterior keel, which is smaller, and in the subsequent whorls the suture is not appressed but distinct. The spiral sculpture consists of on the first two whorls a strong peripheral cord and one thread at the suture, on the third whorl three threads in front of the cord, on the remainder four. On the body whorl the peripheral cord is not prominent but from the anal fasciole to the siphonal canal are about 16 strong threads with wider interspaces and an occasional intercalary smaller thread. They do not nodulate when they cross the ribs. On the siphonal canal are numerous small close-set threads. The anal fasciole is without spiral sculpture. The axial sculpture consists of (on the body whorl 13) strong rounded ribs not continuous up the spire and obsolete on the base but prominent and arcuate over the fasciole. reaching the preceding suture which they undulate. The aperture is rather narrow. The anal fasciole at the suture, is shallow and wide. The thin outer lip is moderately produced. The inner lip is smooth and erased. The columella is short, straight, attenuated in front. The siphonal canal is short but distinct.

== Distribution ==
This marine species occurs off Alaska, found at Port Althorp.
