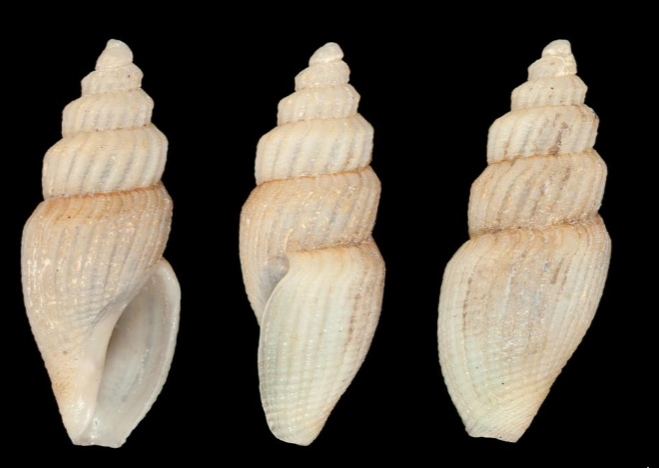
- Shell of Granotoma krausei (holotype at the Smithsonian Institution)

Scientific classification
- Kingdom: Animalia
- Phylum: Mollusca
- Class: Gastropoda
- Subclass: Caenogastropoda
- Order: Neogastropoda
- Superfamily: Conoidea
- Family: Mangeliidae
- Genus: Granotoma
- Species: G. krausei

Binomial name
- Granotoma krausei (W. H. Dall, 1887)

Synonyms
- Bela krausei Dall, W. H., 1887 (original combination); Lora krausei (Dall, W.H., 1887); Lora lotta Dall, W. H., 1919; Lora luetkeni Dall, W. H., 1919; Oenopota krausei (Dall W. H., 1887); Oenopota lotta W. H. Dall, 1919; Oenopota luetkeni W. H. Dall, 1919

= Granotoma krausei =

Species of gastropod

Granotoma krausei is a species of sea snail, a marine gastropod mollusk in the family Mangeliidae.

There is one subspecies : Granotoma krausei regulus (W. H. Dall, 1919) (synonym: Oenopota regulus W. H. Dall, 1919.

== Description ==
The length of the shell varies between 7 mm and 12 mm.

(Original description) The small shell is elongate and ovate, compressed. it has about six whorls and a rather large smooth protoconch. The transverse sculpture of, on the body whorl, consists of about twenty- six broad flattened waves, strongly flexed, most elevated over the fasciole, and becoming narrower and less prominent anteriorly. The outer angle of the anal notch is rather prominent and makes an angulation especially of the earlier whorls, which fall away in a peculiarly flattened manner to the suture. The longitudinal sculpture consists of fine sharp grooves, which pass uniformly over the ribs and interspaces, are somewhat stronger on the earlier whorls and very uniform, only a little coarser on the siphonal canal. The notch is more marked than usual in this genus. The shell is pure white and the epidermis is grayish yellow and quite strong.

== Distribution ==
This species occurs in the Sea of Japan, the Bering Sea and off Alaska and British Columbia.
