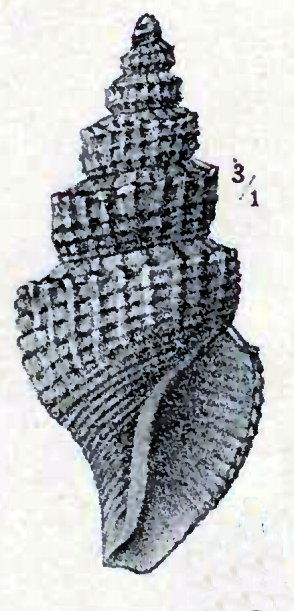
- Drawing of a shell of Propebela exarata

Scientific classification
- Kingdom: Animalia
- Phylum: Mollusca
- Class: Gastropoda
- Subclass: Caenogastropoda
- Order: Neogastropoda
- Superfamily: Conoidea
- Family: Mangeliidae
- Genus: Propebela
- Species: P. exarata

Binomial name
- Propebela exarata (Møller, 1842)

Synonyms
- Bela concinnula Verrill, 1882; Bela exarata (Møller, 1842); Bela mitrula (Lovén, S.L., 1846); Canetoma exarata (Møller, 1842); Defrancia exarata Moller, 1842 (original combination); Lora exarata (Møller, 1842); Oenopota exarata (Møller, 1842); Oenopota mitrula (S.L. Lovén, 1846); Pleurotoma exarata Herzenstein, 1885; Tritonia mitrula Lovén, 1846

= Propebela exarata =

Species of gastropod

Propebela exarata is a species of sea snail, a marine gastropod mollusk in the family Mangeliidae.

== Description ==
The length of the shell attains 12 mm.

The white shell has an ovate-fusiform shape and is clathrate. It contains 6 whorls. The longitudinal ribs are eminently pronounced and are crossed by transverse plicae.

== Distribution ==
This marine species occurs off Massachusetts, United States, Greenland, the Lofoten Islands and Nova Zembla, in the Kara Sea and the Arctic shores of Siberia; Arctic Ocean to Monterey, California, United States.

Fossils have been found in Greenland, Labrador, England and Spitsbergen.
