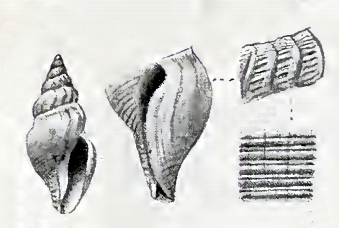
- Original image of a shell of Propebela lateplicata

Scientific classification
- Kingdom: Animalia
- Phylum: Mollusca
- Class: Gastropoda
- Subclass: Caenogastropoda
- Order: Neogastropoda
- Superfamily: Conoidea
- Family: Mangeliidae
- Genus: Propebela
- Species: P. lateplicata

Binomial name
- Propebela lateplicata (Strebel, 1905)

Synonyms
- Bela lateplicata Strebel, H., 1905; Oenopota lateplicata (Strebel, 1905)

= Propebela lateplicata =

Species of gastropod

Propebela lateplicata is a species of sea snail, a marine gastropod mollusk in the family Mangeliidae.

== Description ==
The length of the shell attains 12 mm.

(Original description in German) The shell has as very thick shel. It is white and is covered with a yellowish cuticle. It is more pointed than Antarctospira angusteplicata (Strebel, 1905), as the whorls of the protoconch are laid out much smaller.

The 6½ whorls have a broader slope at the suture, so that the blunt shoulder lies somewhat lower than in Antarctospira angusteplicata. Otherwise, the form is very similar, only the snout is not as long, the aperture is somewhat broader, and the columellar section is simpler.

Sculpture: Axial ribs - the first 1½ whorls are smooth, then the spiral sculpture begins, and the ribs only begin with the second whorl. The ribs on the upper whorls are moderately broad, not very high, and are more swollen only at the shoulder. They rapidly diminish in strength, so that they become very flat on the body whorl, and often already on the penultimate, whorl. They are arranged more irregularly and widely spaced than on the upper whorls, where they are separated by interspaces approximately equal to their own width. They also have the appearance of being compressed, and where they are flat, one can still discern the fine growth striae upon them. Towards the aperture, they only appear as coarse growth striae.

The spiral sculpture is very attractive on fresh, and especially on immature, specimens, as it later becomes somewhat more rounded. It generally consists of alternately narrow and broader flat cords, but irregularities occur, with the cords becoming uniformly broad. Uniformly broad and narrow cords always stand on the sloping area at the suture, and likewise on the snout, where they become very narrow. The cords are no longer discernible on the height of the folds. The author counts about 50 such cords on the body whorl.

== Distribution ==
This marine species occurs in the Magellanic Region and off Southern Argentina
