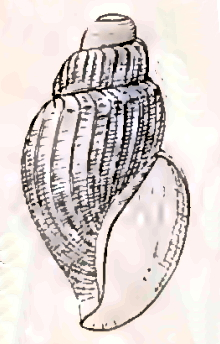
- Image of a shell of Curtitoma ovalis

Scientific classification
- Kingdom: Animalia
- Phylum: Mollusca
- Class: Gastropoda
- Subclass: Caenogastropoda
- Order: Neogastropoda
- Superfamily: Conoidea
- Family: Mangeliidae
- Genus: Curtitoma
- Species: C. ovalis

Binomial name
- Curtitoma ovalis (Friele, 1877)

Synonyms
- Bela pygmaea Verrill, 1882; Bela pygmaea var. attenuata Locard, 1897; Oenopota ovalis (Friele, 1877); Pleurotoma exigua Jeffreys, 1883; Pleurotoma (Bela) ovalis Friele, 1877 (original combination); Propebela pygmaea (A. E. Verrill, 1882)

= Curtitoma ovalis =

Species of gastropod

Curtitoma ovalis is a species of sea snail, a marine gastropod mollusk in the family Mangeliidae.

== Description ==
The length of the shell varies between 4.8 mm and 5.5 mm. The very small shell has a fusiform or subovate shape, with four or five convex whorls, a very short spire, and a large body whorl. The sculpture is very finely cancellated or reticulated. The whorls are usually evenly rounded, moderately convex, but often have a slightly marked, rounded shoulder. The suture is somewhat impressed, and rather oblique. The protoconch is relatively big, with a blunt apex, so that it appears to be obtuse, or rounded, smooth, and glassy. The whole surface below the protoconch is covered by fine, raised, revolving cinguli (raised spiral lines), separated by slight grooves of about the same width, and by equally fine, slightly sinuous, transverse riblets, coincident with the lines of growth, and receding in a distinct curve on the subsutural band. The crossing of these two sets of lines produces a finely cancellated sculpture over the whole surface, but the transverse lines are usually more evident on the convexity of the whorls, while the spiral lines are more conspicuous anteriorly, and on the siphon. The aperture is relatively large, oblong-elliptical, slightly obtusely angled posteriorly. The sinus is shallow, but distinct, with even concave. The outer lip is elsewhere uniformly convex. The siphonal canal is short and broad, not constricted at the base by any incurvature of the outer lip. The columella is strongly concave or excavated, and in the middle, sigmoid anteriorly. The shell is pale greenish white, and covered by a thin epidermis of similar color. The operculum ear is shaped with a central ridge.

== Distribution ==
This species occurs in the bathyal and abyssal parts of the Arctic Ocean (at depths between 557 m and 4,734 m), Northwest Atlantic Ocean and off Iceland and Portugal.
