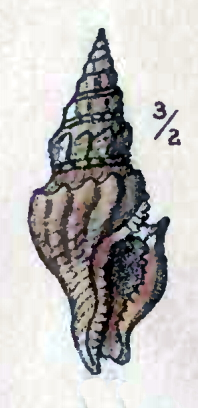
- Drawing of the shell of Oenopota cinerea

Scientific classification
- Kingdom: Animalia
- Phylum: Mollusca
- Class: Gastropoda
- Subclass: Caenogastropoda
- Order: Neogastropoda
- Superfamily: Conoidea
- Family: Mangeliidae
- Genus: Oenopota
- Species: O. cinerea

Binomial name
- Oenopota cinerea (Møller, 1842)

Synonyms
- Defrancia cinerea Møller, 1842; Mangilia cinerea (Møller, 1842); Nodotoma cinerea (Møller, 1842); Pleurotomoides cinerea (H.P.C. Møller, 1842)

= Oenopota cinerea =

Species of gastropod

Oenopota cinerea is a species of sea snail, a marine gastropod mollusk in the family Mangeliidae.

== Description ==
The shell does normally have a yellowish brown or white coloration, and the space above the tuberculated angle is typically smooth. The length of the shell varies between 11 mm and 22 mm.

This predatory species has a benthos functional group.

== Distribution ==
This species occurs in European waters, the Northwest Atlantic Ocean and the arctic waters of Canada.

It is under an exotic conservation status in the Northwest Territories.
