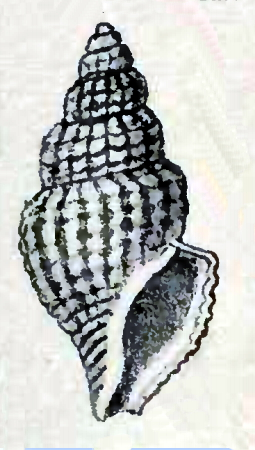
- Drawing of a shell of Propebela fidicula

Scientific classification
- Kingdom: Animalia
- Phylum: Mollusca
- Class: Gastropoda
- Subclass: Caenogastropoda
- Order: Neogastropoda
- Superfamily: Conoidea
- Family: Mangeliidae
- Genus: Propebela
- Species: P. fidicula

Binomial name
- Propebela fidicula (A.A. Gould, 1849)

Synonyms
- Bela fidicula (Gould, 1849); Fusus fidicula Gould, 1849 (original combination); Lora fidicula (Gould, 1849); Oenopota fidicula (Gould, 1849)

= Propebela fidicula =

Species of gastropod

Propebela fidicula is a species of sea snail, a marine gastropod mollusk in the family Mangeliidae.

== Description ==
The length of the shell attains 11.5 mm

The dirty white shell contains 7 broadly shouldered whorls. These show; about twenty-four longitudinal plications, crossed and decussated by more crowded delicate revolving lines.

== Distribution ==
This marine species occurs from the Aleutian Islands, Alaska to the Salish Sea and the Puget Sound.
