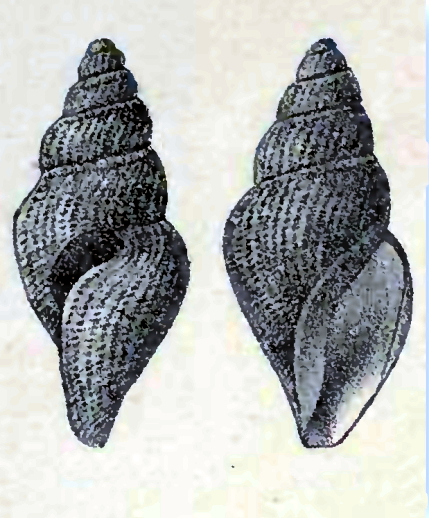
- Drawing of a shell of Curtitoma decussata

Scientific classification
- Kingdom: Animalia
- Phylum: Mollusca
- Class: Gastropoda
- Subclass: Caenogastropoda
- Order: Neogastropoda
- Superfamily: Conoidea
- Family: Mangeliidae
- Genus: Curtitoma
- Species: C. decussata

Binomial name
- Curtitoma decussata (Couthouy, 1839)

Synonyms
- Bela decussata (Couthouy, 1839) not (Locard, 1892); Bela tenuicostata var. frielei Friele, 1886; Lora tenuicostata (G.O. Sars, 1878); Oenopota decussata Couthouy; Oenopota decussatus (Couthouy, 1839); Pleurotoma decussata Couthouy, 1839

= Curtitoma decussata =

Species of gastropod

Curtitoma decussata is a species of sea snail, a marine gastropod mollusk in the family Mangeliidae.

== Description ==
The length of the shell varies between 5 mm and 13 mm.

The shell has an ovate-fusiform shape, with a moderate, scarcely turreted spire. It contains six or seven round-shouldered whorls. The sculpture consists of about 24 sigmoid longitudinal ribs, evanescing about the middle of the body whorl, and close revolving striae across the ribs. The sinus is well marked, close to the suture. The siphonal canal is narrowed, but short. The columella is nearly straight in the middle. The color of the shell is white, yellowish or pinkish white.

== Distribution ==
This marine species is circum-arctic and occurs in the Northwest Atlantic Ocean, Canada and the Gulf of Maine; on the continental shelf of the Alaska, Beaufort Sea; found at depths between 25 m and 780 m. It has also been found as a fossil in Quaternary strata of Greenland and Iceland; age range: 2.588 to 0.781 Ma.
