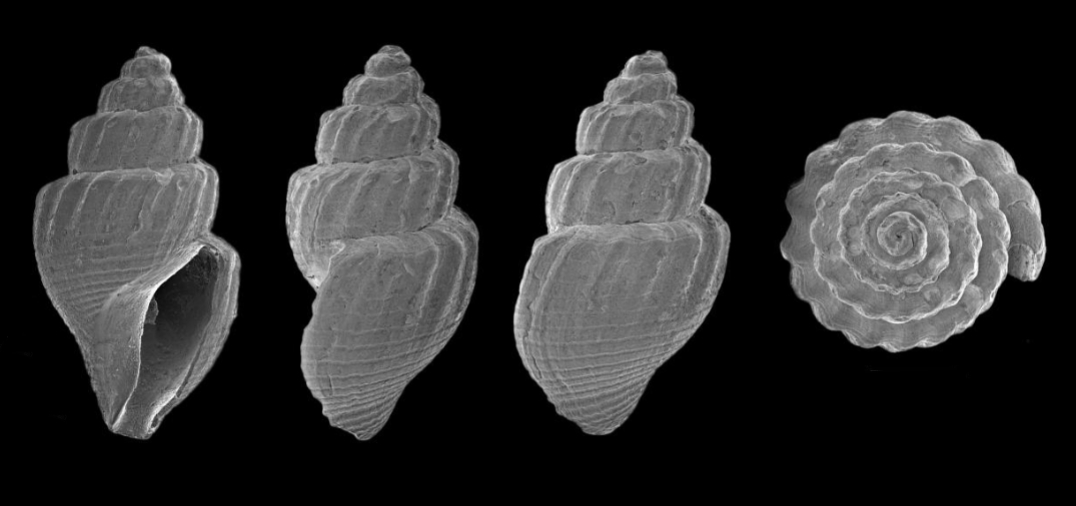
- Shell of Curtitoma incisula (holotype at the Smithsonian Institution)

Scientific classification
- Kingdom: Animalia
- Phylum: Mollusca
- Class: Gastropoda
- Subclass: Caenogastropoda
- Order: Neogastropoda
- Superfamily: Conoidea
- Family: Mangeliidae
- Genus: Curtitoma
- Species: C. incisula

Binomial name
- Curtitoma incisula (Verrill, 1882)

Synonyms
- Bela incisula Verrill, 1882 (original combination); Curtitoma hecuba Bartsch, 1941; Oenopota incisula (Verrill, 1882)

= Curtitoma incisula =

Species of gastropod

Curtitoma incisula is a species of sea snail, a marine gastropod mollusk in the family Mangeliidae.

== Description ==
The length of the shell varies between 5.5 mm and 10.5 mm.

(Original description) The shell is small, sub-fusiform, too short ovate. It contains about five or six turreted, flattened whorls, which are angularly shouldered just below the suture. The subsutural band arises abruptly from the suture, nearly at right angles, and its surface is flat or slightly concave, marked by strongly recurved lines of growth, but mostly without spiral lines. The shoulder is often nearly right-angled. The whorls are decidedly flattened in the middle. There are on the body whorl, about twenty rather broad, flattened or rounded ribs, which are nearly straight, a little prominent and usually slightly nodose at the shoulder, but they disappear a short distance below it. They are separated by well excavated, concave grooves, deepest close to the shoulder. The most characteristic feature of the sculpture is that the surface is marked by rather fine, but regular and distinct, sharply incised, narrow, revolving grooves, which are rather distant, with flat intervals. Of these, there are usually about three to five on the penultimate whorl, and about twenty to twenty-eight on the body whorl, the greater number being below the middle, on the siphon, where they become coarser and closer, with narrower rounded intervals. One of the sulci, just below the shoulder, is usually more distinct, and cuts the ribs so as to give their upper ends a subnodulous appearance. Below this there is usually a rather wide zone, without grooves usually no revolving lines above the shoulder. The apex is usually eroded. When perfect it is acute. The protoconch has a very small and slightly prominent smooth apex. Its first whorl is marked with fine spiral lines. The next whorl has, at first, about three stronger, spiral, raised cinguli, which soon begin to be crossed by thin transverse riblets. The aperture measures about half the length of the shell. It is narrow ovate, or elliptical, angulated above. The siphonal canal is short, nearly straight, and a little narrowed at the base by an incurvature of the lip. The outer lip has a decided angle at the shoulder, below which the edge is well-rounded, and projects strongly forward, in the middle. The sinus, above the shoulder, is rather deep, wide, and evenly rounded within. The columella is strongly excavated in the middle, obliquely receding at the end. The shell is commonly greenish white and covered by a thin, close, greenish epidermis; but some specimens are clear white, and rarely pinkish.

== Distribution ==
This species occurs in the Northwest Atlantic Ocean, Canada and the Gulf of Maine; found at depths between 20 m and 190 m.
