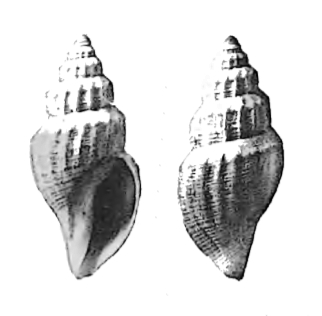
- Image of a shell of Propebela harpularia

Scientific classification
- Kingdom: Animalia
- Phylum: Mollusca
- Class: Gastropoda
- Subclass: Caenogastropoda
- Order: Neogastropoda
- Superfamily: Conoidea
- Family: Mangeliidae
- Genus: Propebela
- Species: P. harpularia

Binomial name
- Propebela harpularia (Couthouy, 1838)

Synonyms
- Fusus harpularius Couthouy, 1838 (original combination); Bela harpularia (Couthouy, 1838); Oenopota harpularia (Couthouy, 1838); Oenopota harpularius (Couthouy, 1838); Pleurotoma harpularia Herzenstein, 1885; Tritonium roseum Lovén, S.L., 1846

= Propebela harpularia =

Species of gastropod

Propebela harpularia is a species of sea snail, a marine gastropod mollusk in the family Mangeliidae.

The taxonomy is this species is uncertain. Relying on Tucker, the website |Gastropods.com states this species as Oenopota harpularius (Couthouy, J.P., 1838), while WoRMS states Oenopota harpularius as a synonym of Propebela harpularia (Couthouy, 1838)

== Description ==
The characters of this species are very variable. Usually, the ribs are 14–16 in number, but some specimens have as many as 20. The colour is always red, or brownish. The interspaces between the ribs, round the angulated part of the body whorl, are concavely excavated. There transverse sculpture appears without being interrupted by the carina.

== Distribution ==
This species occurs in arctic and boreal seas.
