= C. bartschi =

C. bartschi may refer to:

- Conus bartschi, a sea snail species
- Curtitoma bartschi, a sea snail species
- Cymatosyrinx bartschi, a sea snail species

== Synonyms ==
- Collocalia bartschi, a synonym for Aerodramus bartschi, the Mariana swiftlet or Guam swiftlet, a bird species
