= P. nivea =

P. nivea may refer to:

- Pagodroma nivea, the snow petrel, a bird species that breeds on the Antarctic Peninsula, South Georgia Islands and other islands of the Scotia Archipelago
- Panchlora nivea, the banana cockroach, an insect species found in Cuba and the Caribbean
- Pieris nivea, a synonym for Elodina padusa
- Plasmopara nivea, a plant pathogen species
- Procanthia nivea, a moth species found in South Africa
- Propebela nivea, a sea snail species
- Prostanthera nivea, the snowy mint-bush, a shrub species native to Queensland, New South Wales and Victoria in Australia

== See also ==
- Nivea (disambiguation)
