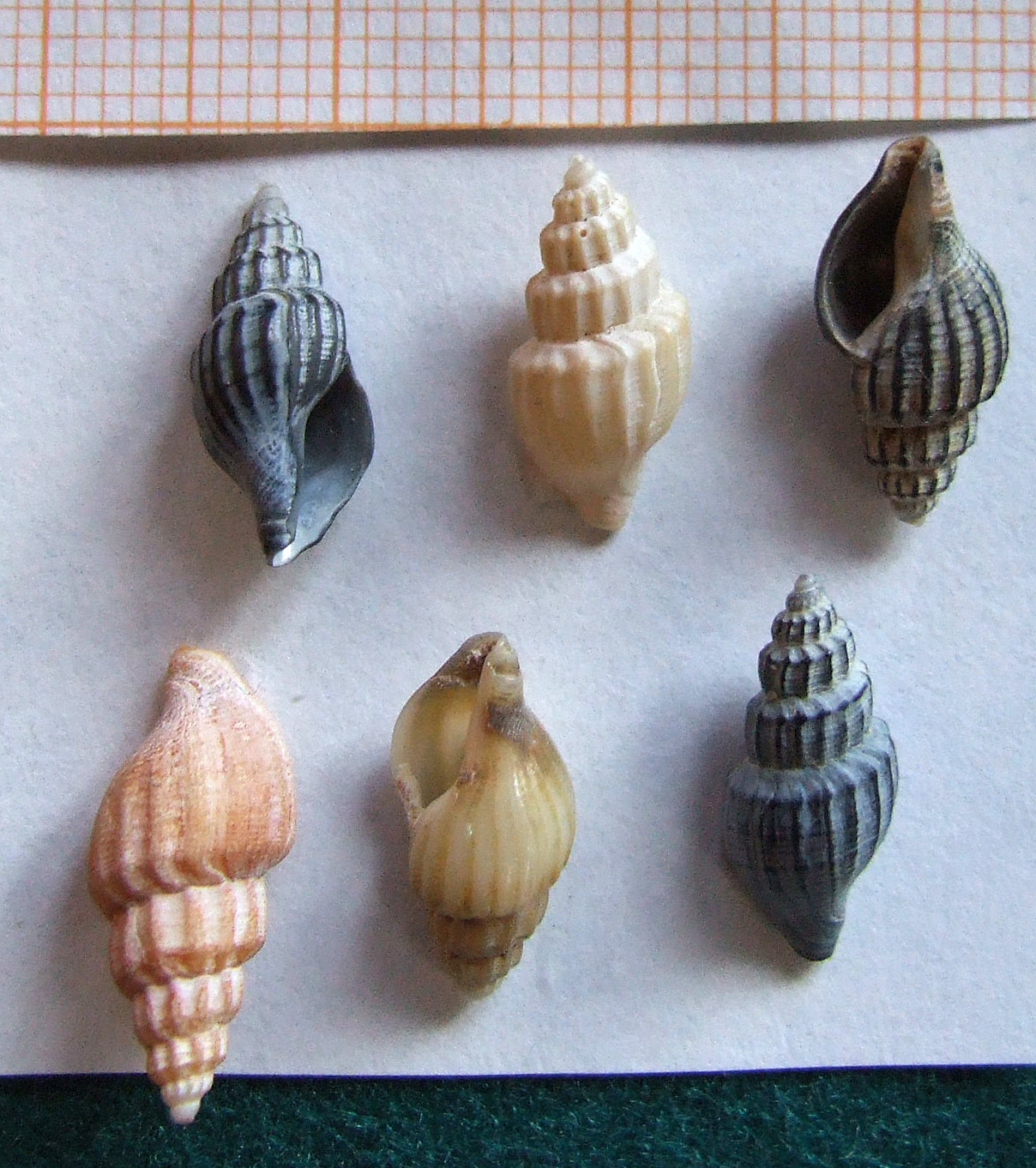
- shells of Propebela turricula

Scientific classification
- Kingdom: Animalia
- Phylum: Mollusca
- Class: Gastropoda
- Subclass: Caenogastropoda
- Order: Neogastropoda
- Superfamily: Conoidea
- Family: Mangeliidae
- Genus: Propebela; Iredale, 1918

Type species
- Murex turricula Montagu, 1803

Species
- See text

Synonyms
- Canetoma Bartsch, 1941; Cestoma Bartsch, 1941; Funitoma Bartsch, 1941; Turritoma Bartsch, 1941; Turritomella Bartsch, 1941

= Propebela =

Genus of gastropods

Propebela is a genus of sea snails, marine gastropod mollusks in the family Mangeliidae.

== Species ==
Species within the genus Propebela include:

- Propebela alaskensis (Dall, 1871)
- Propebela alitakensis (Dall, 1919)
- Propebela angulosa (G. O. Sars, 1878)
- Propebela arctica (Adams, 1855)
- Propebela areta (Bartsch, 1941)
- Propebela assimilis (Sars G. O., 1878)
- Propebela bergensis (Friele, 1886)
- Propebela bogdanovi Merkuljev, 2021
- Propebela cancellata (Mighels & Adams, 1842)
- Propebela cassis Bogdanov, 1989
- Propebela concinnula (A. E. Verrill, 1882)
- Propebela diomedea Bartsch, 1944
- Propebela eurybia (Bartsch, 1941)
- Propebela exarata (Møller, 1842)
- Propebela exquisita Bartsch, 1941
- Propebela fidicula (Gould, 1849)
- Propebela golikovi (Bogdanov, 1985)
- Propebela goryachevi Bogdanov, 1989
- Propebela harpularia (Couthouy, 1838)
- Propebela kyurokusimana (Nomura & Hatai, 1940)
- Propebela lateplicata (Strebel, 1905)
- Propebela luetkeana (Krause, 1885)
- Propebela margaritae (Bogdanov, 1985)
- Propebela marinae Bogdanov, 1989
- Propebela miona (Dall, 1919)
- Propebela mitrata (Dall, 1919)
- Propebela monterealis (Dall, 1919)
- Propebela nivea Okutani, 1968
- Propebela nobilis (Møller, 1842)
- Propebela pitysa (Dall, 1919)
- Propebela popovia (Dall, 1919)
- Propebela pribilova (Dall, 1919)
- Propebela profunda Castellanos & Landoni, 1993
- Propebela profundicola Bartsch, 1944
- Propebela rassina (Dall, 1919)
- Propebela rathbuni (Verrill, 1884)
- Propebela rufa (Montagu, 1803)
- Propebela rugulata (Reeve, 1846)
- Propebela scalaris (Møller, 1842)
- Propebela scalaroides (Sars G. O., 1878)
- Propebela siogamaensis (Nomura & Zinbo, 1940)
- Propebela smithi Bartsch, 1944
- Propebela spitzbergensis (Friele, 1886)
- Propebela subtrophonoidea (Okutani, 1964)
- Propebela subvitrea (Verrill, 1884)
- Propebela svetlanae Bogdanov, 1989
- Propebela tayensis (Nomura, S. & K.N. Hatai, 1938)
- Propebela terpeniensis Bogdanov, 1989
- Propebela tersa (Bartsch, 1941)
- Propebela turricula (Montagu, 1803)
- Propebela variabilis Bogdanov, 1990
- Propebela verrilli Bogdanov, 1989

Synonymized species

- Propebela abernethyi (Dell, 1956): synonym of Antiguraleus abernethyi Dell, 1956
- Propebela bigranulosa Okutani, 1964: synonym of Mioawateria bigranulosa (Okutani, 1964)
- Propebela delicata (Okutani, 1964): synonym of Curtitoma delicata (Okutani, 1964)
- Propebela fenestrata (Powell, 1942): synonym of Antiguraleus fenestratus Powell, 1942
- Propebela fusiformis (Dell, 1956): synonym of Antiguraleus fusiformis Dell, 1956
- Propebela gouldii: synonym of Propebela rugulata
- Propebela hinae Okutani, 1968: synonym of Curtitoma hinae (Okutani, 1968)
- Propebela infanda (Webster, 1906): synonym of Antiguraleus infandus (Webster, 1906)
- Propebela multistriata (Dell, 1956): synonym of Antiguraleus multistriatus Dell, 1956
- Propebela munda (Suter, 1909): synonym of Antiguraleus mundus (Suter, 1909)
- Propebela murrhea (Webster, 1906): synonym of Antiguraleus murrhea (Webster, 1906)
- Propebela otagoensis (Powell, 1942): synonym of Antiguraleus otagoensis Powell, 1942
- Propebela pedica (Powell, 1942): synonym of Antiguraleus pedicus Powell, 1942
- Propebela plicata Okutani, 1964: synonym of Plicisyrinx plicata (Okutani, 1964)
- Propebela pulcherrima (Dell, 1956): synonym of Antiguraleus pulcherrimus Dell, 1956
- Propebela pygmaea (Verrill, 1882): synonym of Curtitoma ovalis (Friele, 1877)
- Propebela reticulata: synonym of Curtitoma trevelliana (Turton, 1834)
- Propebela rossiana (Powell, 1942): synonym of Antiguraleus rossianus Powell, 1942
- Propebela schneideri M. Yokoyama, 1922: synonym of Propebela assimilis (Sars, 1878)
- Propebela subtruncata (Powell, 1942): synonym of Antiguraleus subtruncatus Powell, 1942
- Propebela subturgida (Verrill, 1884): synonym of Oenopota subturgida (A. E. Verrill, 1884)
- Propebela ula (Watson, 1881): synonym of Asperdaphne ula (Watson, 1881)
- Propebela valentina P. Bartsch in A.N. Golikov & V.V. Gulbin, 1977: synonym of Oenopota valentina A.N. Golikov & V.V. Gulbin, 1977
- Propebela venusta Okutani, 1964: synonym of Propebela exquisita Bartsch, 1941
- Propebela viridula sensu (Møller, 1842): synonym of Propebela arctica (Adams, 1855)
- Propebela viridula (Fabricius, 1780): synonym of Admete viridula (Fabricius, 1780)
- Propebela yokoyamai K. Oyama, 1973: synonym of Propebela assimilis (Sars, 1878)
