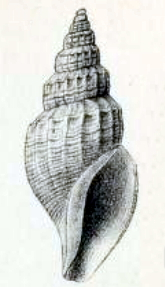
- Original image of a shell of Propebela scalaroides

Scientific classification
- Kingdom: Animalia
- Phylum: Mollusca
- Class: Gastropoda
- Subclass: Caenogastropoda
- Order: Neogastropoda
- Superfamily: Conoidea
- Family: Mangeliidae
- Genus: Propebela
- Species: P. scalaroides

Binomial name
- Propebela scalaroides (Sars G.O., 1878)

Synonyms
- Bela scalaroides Sars G. O., 1878; Oenopota scalaroides (Sars G.O., 1878)

= Propebela scalaroides =

Species of gastropod

Propebela scalaroides is a species of sea snail, a marine gastropod mollusk in the family Mangeliidae.

== Description ==
The length of the shell varies between 22 mm and 27 mm.

The small, white shell has an elongate-fusiform shape. The shell contains 7 slightly convex whorls. The spire is longer than the aperture. The shell is longitudinally plicate with about 20 ribs. The sharp apex resembles Propebela rugulata, and the same is the case with the operculum . The teeth of the radula have the broad typical form.

== Distribution ==
This marine species occurs off Eastern Greenland and off Nova Zembla.
