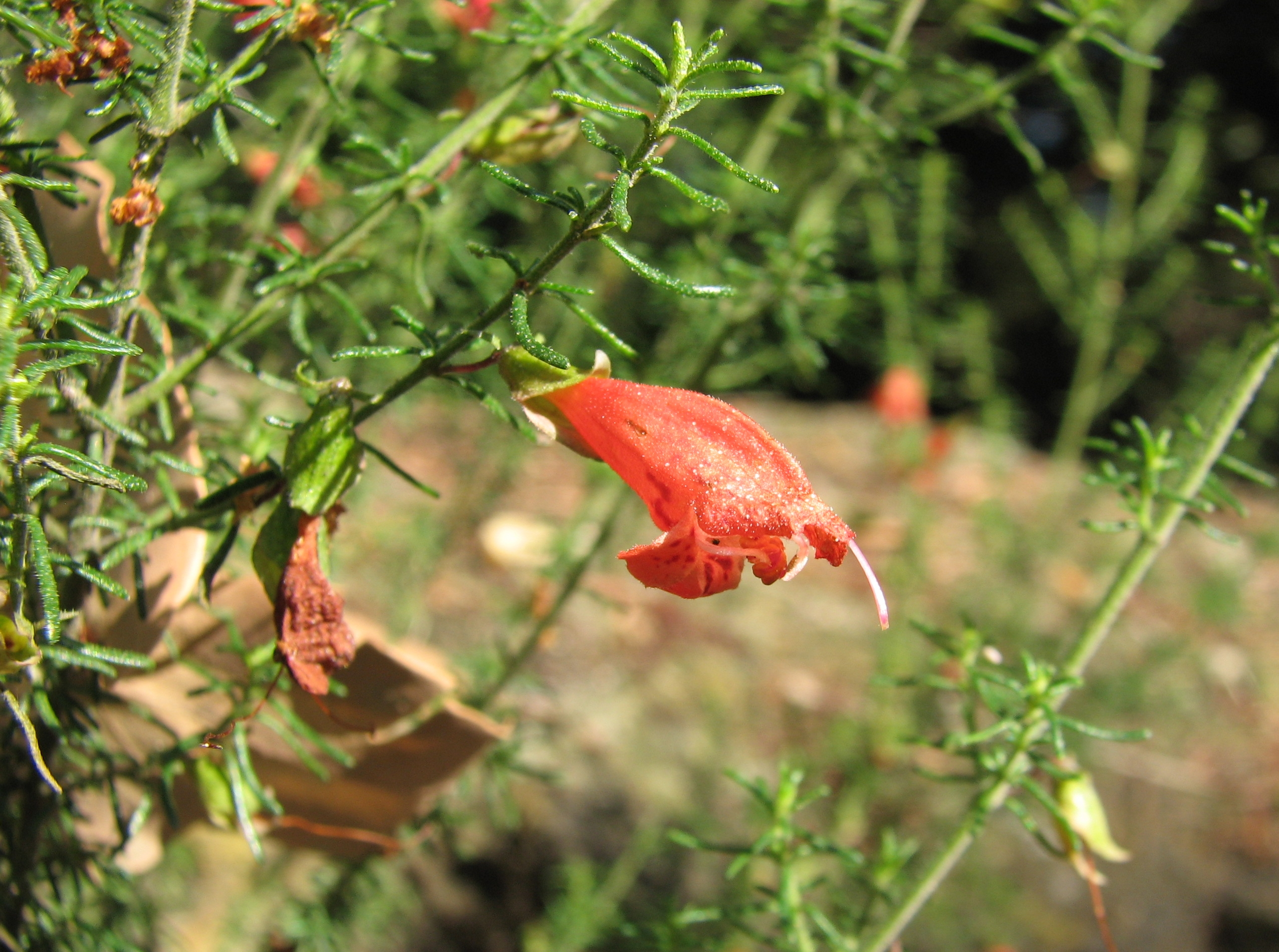
- In Maranoa Gardens

Scientific classification
- Kingdom: Plantae
- Clade: Tracheophytes
- Clade: Angiosperms
- Clade: Eudicots
- Clade: Asterids
- Order: Lamiales
- Family: Lamiaceae
- Genus: Prostanthera
- Species: P. aspalathoides

Binomial name
- Prostanthera aspalathoides A.Cunn. ex Benth.
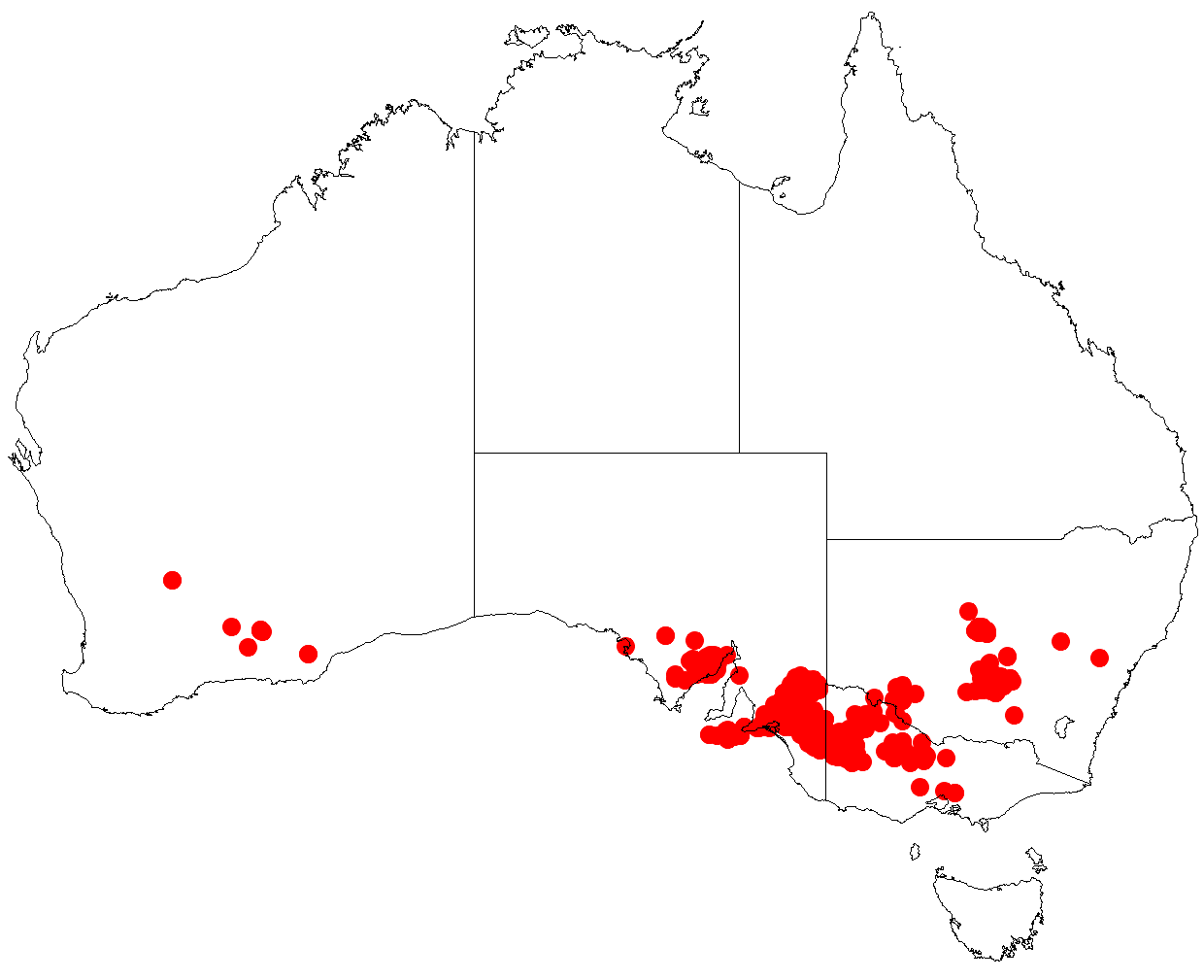
- Occurrence data from AVH

Synonyms
- Prostanthera coccinea var. aspalathoides (A.Cunn. ex Benth.) Maiden & Betche, Prostanthera eriocalyx Gand.; Prostanthera patula Gand.; Prostanthera coccinea auct. non F.Muell.: Mueller, F.J.H. von (1868)

= Prostanthera aspalathoides =

Scarlet mint-bush

Species of plant

Prostanthera aspalathoides, commonly known as scarlet mint-bush, is a species of flowering plant that is endemic to south-eastern Australia. It is a small shrub with hairy branches, cylindrical or linear to elliptic or oblong leaves and red, pinkish red, or orange flowers arranged singly in leaf axils.

== Description ==
Prostanthera aspalathoides is a compact, upright shrub that typically grows to a height of 0.3–1 m (1 ft 0 in – 3 ft 3 in) and has densely hairy, glandular branchlets. The aromatic leaves are cylindrical to linear-elliptic in shape, 1.5–6 mm (0.059–0.236 in) long, 0.5–1 mm (0.020–0.039 in) wide and sessile or on a petiole up to 0.5 mm (0.020 in) long. The flowers are arranged singly in leaf axils with bracteoles 2–3 mm (0.079–0.118 in) long at the base. The sepals are 5–7 mm (0.20–0.28 in) long and joined at the base to form a tube 3–4 mm (0.12–0.16 in) long. The petals are 10–20 mm (0.39–0.79 in) long forming a red, pinkish red, orange or rarely yellow tube 8–11 mm (0.31–0.43 in) long. Flowering mainly occurs in spring but flowers may be present in most months.

== Taxonomy and naming ==
Prostanthera aspalathoides was first formally described in 1834 by George Bentham in his book Labiatarum genera et species, from an unpublished description by Allan Cunningham who collected the type specimens near the Lachlan River. The specific epithet alludes to a similarity to plants of the genus Aspalathus.

== Distribution and habitat ==
Scarlet mint bush grows in mallee and occurs in New South Wales, Victoria and South Australia. It is found west from the Rankins Springs district in New South Wales, in the northern half of Victoria and in the south-east of South Australia, including the Yorke and Eyre Peninsulas and Kangaroo Island.

== Uses ==
=== Use in horticulture ===
Prosthanthera aspalthioides is best adapted to cultivation in dry conditions with low humidity. Plants prefer a position in full sun or partial shade with good drainage and withstand moderate frost. Cuttings are the preferred propagation method, as seed germinates slowly. Plants may also be grafted on rootstocks of the hardier species Prostanthera nivea.

=== Fragrant oil ===
Tests to extract cineole (also known as eucalyptol), a fragrant oil found in Prostanthera were conducted over 100 years ago by Joseph Bosisto an industrial chemist and oil distiller. Later tests on Prostanthera aspalathoides produced an oil yield of 2-3%.
