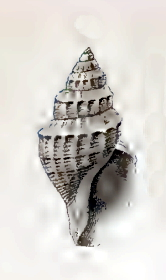
- Original image of a shell of Propebela spitzbergensis

Scientific classification
- Kingdom: Animalia
- Phylum: Mollusca
- Class: Gastropoda
- Subclass: Caenogastropoda
- Order: Neogastropoda
- Superfamily: Conoidea
- Family: Mangeliidae
- Genus: Propebela
- Species: P. spitzbergensis

Binomial name
- Propebela spitzbergensis (Friele, 1886)

Synonyms
- Bela spitzbergensis Friele, 1886; Bela rugulata var. spitzbergensis Friele, 1886 (original combination); Oenopota spitzbergensis (Friele, 1886); Propebela rugulata spitzbergensis (Friele, 1886)

= Propebela spitzbergensis =

Species of gastropod

Propebela spitzbergensis is a species of sea snail, a marine gastropod mollusk in the family Mangeliidae.

== Description ==
The length of the shell varies between 7 mm and 20 mm.

(Original description) The characteristics of this species are close to Propebela rugulata; the relations between the spire and the aperture, are typical. This species differs, in its sculpture, in having a more projectant angle, which may occasionally pass into a sharp protuberant edge and in a somewhat more marked spiral striation. The operculum appears to be somewhat broader than the typical one. The teeth of the radula have a peculiar recess upon the one side; the form, otherwise, is the broad typical one. Out of 6 specimens examined, all showed the same uniform structure.

== Distribution ==
This marine species occurs off Spitzbergen.
