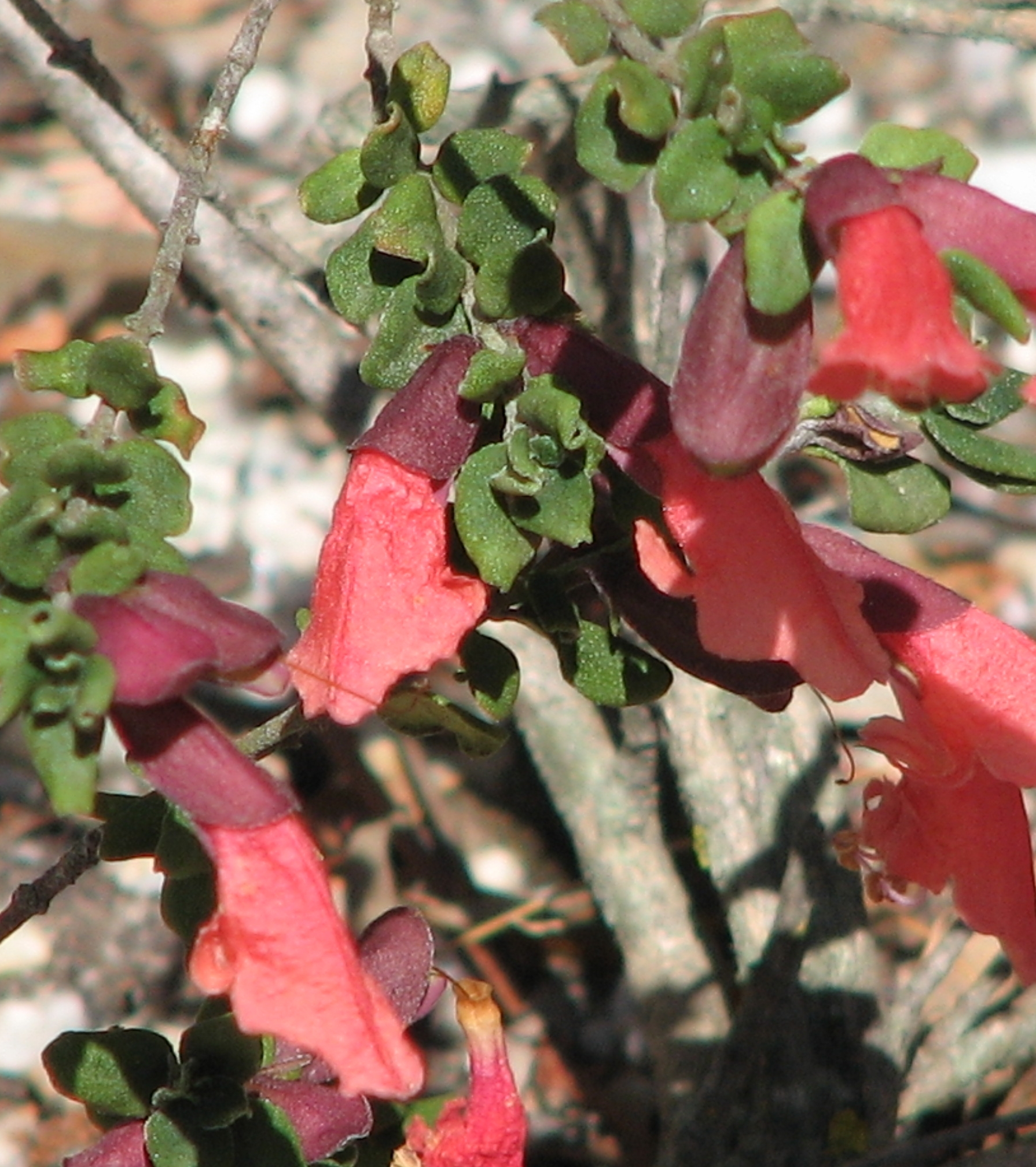
- In Maranoa Gardens

Conservation status
- Vulnerable (EPBC Act)

Scientific classification
- Kingdom: Plantae
- Clade: Tracheophytes
- Clade: Angiosperms
- Clade: Eudicots
- Clade: Asterids
- Order: Lamiales
- Family: Lamiaceae
- Genus: Prostanthera
- Species: P. calycina

Binomial name
- Prostanthera calycina F.Muell. ex Benth.
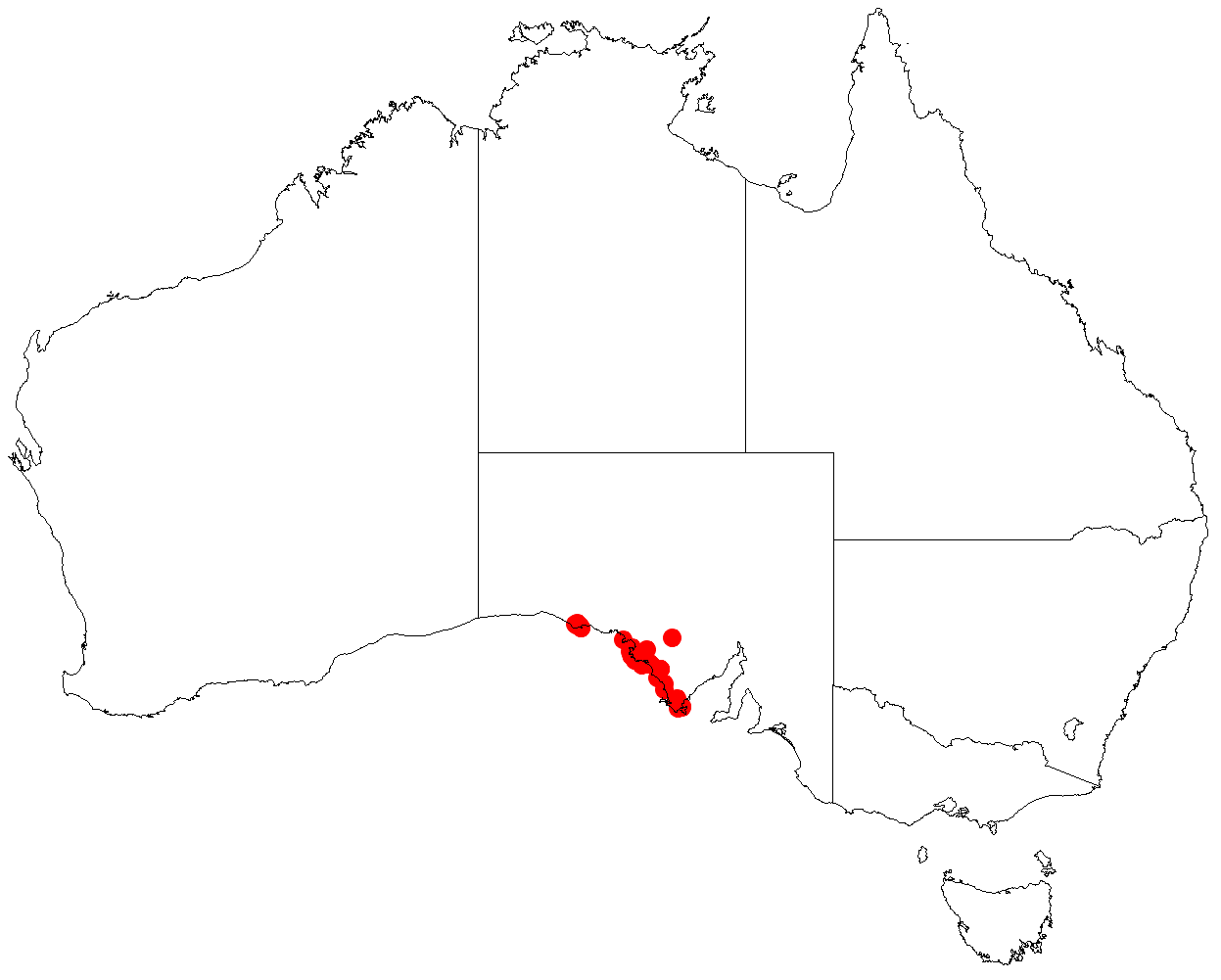
- Occurrence data from AVH

Synonyms
- Prostanthera calicina Briq.

= Prostanthera calycina =

West coast mintbush

Species of plant

Prostanthera calycina, the west coast mintbush, limestone mintbush or red mintbush, is a species of flowering plant that is endemic to the Eyre Peninsula in South Australia. It is a small, more or less prostrate shrub with aromatic, elliptic to oblong leaves and red flowers.

== Description ==
Prostanthera calycina is a more or less prostrate shrub that typically grows to a height of about 0.5 m (1 ft 8 in) and has more or less cylindrical, hairy branches. The leaves are well-spaced along the branchlets, elliptic to oblong, 4–14 mm (0.16–0.55 in) long and 3–5 mm (0.12–0.20 in) wide on a densely hairy petiole 0.8–1.4 mm (0.031–0.055 in) long. The leaves are strongly aromatic when crushed. The flowers are arranged singly in leaf axils on a hairy pedicel 2.5–4.5 mm (0.098–0.177 in) long. The sepals are 8–14 mm (0.31–0.55 in) long forming a tube 6–8 mm (0.24–0.31 in) long with two lobes 4–6 mm (0.16–0.24 in) long and 5–7 mm (0.20–0.28 in) wide. The petals are 17.5–22 mm (0.69–0.87 in) long forming a tube 13–15 mm (0.51–0.59 in) long with two lips. The middle lobe on the lower lip is about 4 mm (0.16 in) long and 3 mm (0.12 in) wide, the side lobes about 3 mm (0.12 in) long. The upper lip has two lobes about 5 mm (0.20 in) long and joined but with a small notch between them. Flowering occurs between September and December.

== Taxonomy ==
Prostanthera calycina was first formally described in 1870 by George Bentham from an unpublished description by Ferdinand von Mueller and the description was published in Flora Australiensis.

== Distribution and habitat ==
West coast mintbush is only known from the Eyre Peninsula in South Australia where it usually grows on limestone outcrops in mallee vegetation.

== Conservation status ==
West coast mintbush is classified as "vulnerable" under the Australian Government Environment Protection and Biodiversity Conservation Act 1999 and the South Australian Government National Parks and Wildlife Act 1972. The main threats to the species include grazing, habitat fragmentation and road maintenance.

== Use in horticulture ==
This mintbush is easily propagated from cuttings or by grafting onto Prostanthera nivea and grows best in dry climates in well drained soil.
