= P. plicata =

P. plicata may refer to:

- Plicisyrinx plicata, a sea snail species
- Psoralea plicata, a herb species found in Pakistan
- Psychotria plicata, a plant species endemic to Jamaica
- Purshia plicata, the antelope bush, a plant species found in Mexico

== See also ==
- Plicata (disambiguation)
