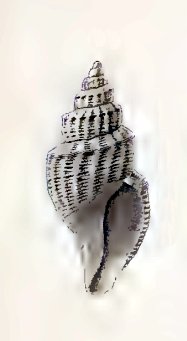
- Image of a shell of Propebela nobilis

Scientific classification
- Kingdom: Animalia
- Phylum: Mollusca
- Class: Gastropoda
- Subclass: Caenogastropoda
- Order: Neogastropoda
- Superfamily: Conoidea
- Family: Mangeliidae
- Genus: Propebela
- Species: P. nobilis

Binomial name
- Propebela nobilis (Møller, 1842)

Synonyms
- Bela brevispira Loyning, 1931; Bela nobilis (Møller, 1842); Bela nobilis var. brevispira Löyning, 1932; Bela rugulata auct. non Reeve, 1846; Defrancia lactea Reeve, 1846; Defrancia nobilis Moller, 1842; Lora nobilis (Möller, 1842); Oenopota nobilis (Møller, 1842); Oenopota turricula auct. non Montagu, 1803; Pleurotoma molleri Reeve, 1846; Pleurotomina nobilis (Möller, 1842); Rhodopetoma erosa auct. non Schrenk, 1867; Turritoma candida auct. non Yokoyama, 1926; Turritoma venusta auct. non Okutani, 1964

= Propebela nobilis =

Species of gastropod

Propebela nobilis is a species of sea snail, a marine gastropod mollusk in the family Mangeliidae.

== Description ==
The shell resembles that of Propebela rugulata. The spire, as a rule, is shorter than the aperture. The axial ribs are strongly projectant, and between them, round the angulated ultimate part of the whorl, a deepish concavity occurs, in which the transversal sculpture distinctly appears.
