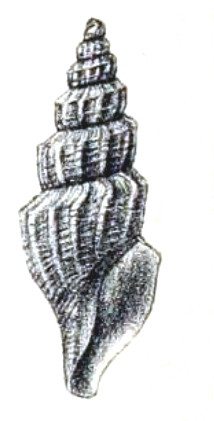
- Original image of a shell of Propebela angulosa

Scientific classification
- Kingdom: Animalia
- Phylum: Mollusca
- Class: Gastropoda
- Subclass: Caenogastropoda
- Order: Neogastropoda
- Superfamily: Conoidea
- Family: Mangeliidae
- Genus: Propebela
- Species: P. angulosa

Binomial name
- Propebela angulosa (G.O. Sars, 1878)

Synonyms
- Bela angulosa Sars G. O., 1878; Oenopota angulosa (Sars G.O., 1878); Pleurotoma angulosa Herzenstein, 1885

= Propebela angulosa =

Species of gastropod

Propebela angulosa is a species of sea snail, a marine gastropod mollusk in the family Mangeliidae.

== Description ==
The length of the shell attains 12 mm. Its characteristics are close to Propebela cancellata (Mighels & C. B. Adams, 1842).

The solid elongate-fusiform shell is white. The spire is turreted. The shell contains 7 whorls. The suture is distinct and deeply impressed. The longitudinal sculpture shows about 14 elevated ribs. The spiral sculpture consists of many striae, mostly below the carina.

== Distribution ==
This species was found in the Barents Sea.
