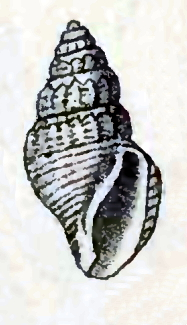
- Curtitoma trevelliana shell

Scientific classification
- Kingdom: Animalia
- Phylum: Mollusca
- Class: Gastropoda
- Subclass: Caenogastropoda
- Order: Neogastropoda
- Superfamily: Conoidea
- Family: Mangeliidae
- Genus: Curtitoma; Bartsch, 1941

Type species
- Curtitoma hecuba Bartsch, 1941

Species
- See text

Synonyms
- Nematoma Bartsch, 1941; Widalli Bogdanov, 1986

= Curtitoma =

Genus of gastropods

Curtitoma is a genus of sea snails, marine gastropod mollusks in the family Mangeliidae.

== Description ==
This genus was introduced by Paul Bartsch in 1941 to accommodate species with a distinct anal sinus and a protoconch sculptured with numerous fine threads, that were otherwise similar to the species in the genera Oenopota Moerch, 1852 and Propebela Iredale, 1918. The shell has an ovoid shape and is short and stubby. The whorls of the teleoconch are strongly tabulatedly shouldered and lack a keel at the angulation of the shoulder. The axial ribs show up strongly between the shoulder and the periphery, but disappear at the base of the shell. The spiral sculpture consists of incised lines on the spire and threads on the columella. The aperture is pear-shaped, decidedly channeled anteriorly and shows a feeble sinus at the shoulder.

== Grammatical gender ==
The grammatical gender is feminine, as composed with the Greek noun τομή, an incision (gender: feminine). However often treated as neuter following Philippi (1836: 165, footnote) and others view of treating Pleurotoma as neuter.

== Species ==
Species within the genus Curtitoma include:

- Curtitoma bartschi (Bogdanov, 1985)
- Curtitoma becklemishevi Bogdanov, 1989
- Curtitoma conoidea (Sars G. O., 1878)
- Curtitoma contraria Bonfitto & Morassi, 2012
- Curtitoma decussata (Couthouy, 1839)
- Curtitoma delicata (Okutani, 1964)
- Curtitoma exquisita (Yokoyama, 1926)
- Curtitoma finmarchia (Friele, 1886)
- Curtitoma fiora (Dall, 1919)
- Curtitoma georgоssiani Merkuljev, 2017
- Curtitoma hebes (Verrill, 1880)
- Curtitoma hinae (Okutani, 1968)
- Curtitoma incisula (Verrill, 1882)
- Curtitoma lawrenciana (Dall, 1919)
- Curtitoma livida (Møller, 1842)
- Curtitoma neymanae Bogdanov, 1989
- Curtitoma niigataensis Bogdanov & Ito, 1992
- Curtitoma novajasemljensis (Leche, 1878)
- Curtitoma ovalis (Friele, 1877)
- Curtitoma piltuniensis (Bogdanov, 1985)
- Curtitoma trevelliana (Turton, 1834)
- Curtitoma violacea (Mighels & C.B Adams, 1842)

Species brought into synonymy

- Curtitoma candita (Yokoyama, 1926): synonym of Oenopota candida (Yokoyama, 1926)
- Curtitoma hecuba Bartsch, 1941: synonym of Curtitoma incisula (Verrill, 1882)
- Curtitoma hokkaidoensis (Barsch, 1941): synonym of Obesotoma hokkaidoensis (Bartsch, 1941)
- Curtitoma microvoluta (Okutani, 1964): synonym of Oenopota candida (Yokoyama, 1926)
- Curtitoma novajasemliensis (Leche, 1878): synonym of Curtitoma novajasemljensis (Leche, 1878)
- Curtitoma reticulata (Brown, 1827): synonym of Curtitoma trevelliana (Turton, 1834)
- Curtitoma trevellianum (Turton W., 1834): synonym of Curtitoma trevelliana (Turton, 1834)
