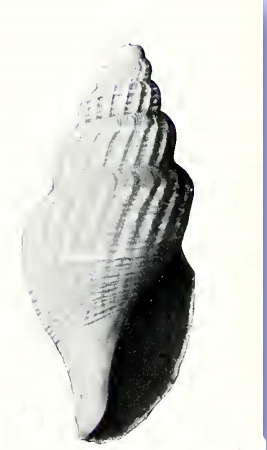
- Original image of Propebela monterealis

Scientific classification
- Kingdom: Animalia
- Phylum: Mollusca
- Class: Gastropoda
- Subclass: Caenogastropoda
- Order: Neogastropoda
- Superfamily: Conoidea
- Family: Mangeliidae
- Genus: Propebela
- Species: P. monterealis

Binomial name
- Propebela monterealis (Dall, 1919)

Synonyms
- Lora monterealis Dall, 1919 (original description); Canetoma monterealis (Dall, W.H., 1919)

= Propebela monterealis =

Species of gastropod

Propebela monterealis is a species of sea snail, a marine gastropod mollusk in the family Conidae, the cone snails and their allies.

== Description ==
The length of the shell is 12 mm, its diameter 5.3 mm.

(Original description) The shell is very similar to Curtitoma trevelliana trevelliana, but larger, with the same number of whorls, the ribs less numerous, more emphatic, with wider interspaces, and a less conspicuous cord at the shoulder.

== Distribution ==
This marine species was found in Monterey Bay, California, USA.
