= Propebela alaskensis =

Scientific classification
- Kingdom: Animalia
- Phylum: Mollusca
- Class: Gastropoda
- Subclass: Caenogastropoda
- Order: Neogastropoda
- Superfamily: Conoidea
- Family: Mangeliidae
- Genus: Propebela
- Species: P. alaskensis

Binomial name
- Propebela alaskensis (Dall, 1871)

Synonyms
- Mangelia alaskensis Dall, 1871; Oenopota alaskensis (W.H. Dall, 1871)

Species of gastropod

Propebela alaskensis is a species of sea snail, a marine gastropod mollusk in the family Mangeliidae,

== Description ==
(Original description) The elongate, fusiform shell has a reddish or purplish brown color. It contains 8 evenly rounded whorls. The rather narrow aperture is less than half and more than a third as long as the shell. The outer lip is thin and sharp. sharp. The columella is straight, with a slight callus. The siphonal canal is short, wide and very slightly recurved. The sutural sinus is obsolete. The sculpture shows almost imperceptible revolving lines, crossed by oblique longitudinal ribs, waved near the suture and obsolete on the lower half of the whorl. The lines of growth are irregular, quite evident. The epidermis is thin, andolivaceous. The whorls are slightly shouldered. The protoconch and the first few small whorls are whitish. The protoconch is smooth, obliquely bent and minute . The suture is deep and impressed. A slight callus shows on the columella. The interior of the aperture is polished, smooth and fuliginous. The ribs are rather strong on the upper whorls.

== Distribution ==
This marine species occurs off Alaska.
