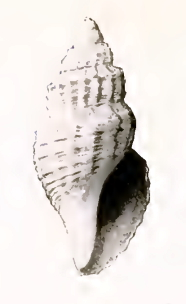
- Original image of a shell of Propebela pribilova

Scientific classification
- Kingdom: Animalia
- Phylum: Mollusca
- Class: Gastropoda
- Subclass: Caenogastropoda
- Order: Neogastropoda
- Superfamily: Conoidea
- Family: Mangeliidae
- Genus: Propebela
- Species: P. pribilova

Binomial name
- Propebela pribilova (Dall, 1919)

Synonyms
- Lora pribilova Dall, 1919 (original description)

= Propebela pribilova =

Species of gastropod

Propebela pribilova is a species of sea snail, a marine gastropod mollusk in the family Mangeliidae.

== Description ==
The length of the shell attains 12 mm, its diameter 5.5 mm.

(Original description) The white shell has a straw-colored periostracum. It contains about six roughly sculptured whorls, the apex eroded. The suture is distinct. The axial sculpture consists of (on the body whorl 16) rounded narrow riblets crossing the whorls and obsolete on the base. The spiral sculpture consists of (on the spire three, on the body whorl four) prominent rounded cords. These are more or less nodose at the intersections with the ribs, and between the cords two or three fine threads and a few finer striae. The posterior cord forms a shoulder to the whorl. On the siphonal canal the cords and threads become more uniform. The aperture is simple. The columella is erased.

== Distribution ==
This marine species was found from Cape Lisburne, Arctic Ocean, south to Esteros Bay, California, USA.
