= Propebela margaritae =

Scientific classification
- Kingdom: Animalia
- Phylum: Mollusca
- Class: Gastropoda
- Subclass: Caenogastropoda
- Order: Neogastropoda
- Superfamily: Conoidea
- Family: Mangeliidae
- Genus: Propebela
- Species: P. margaritae

Binomial name
- Propebela margaritae (Bogdanov, 1985)

Synonyms
- Canetoma margaritae (Bogdanov, 1985); Oenopota margaritae Bogdanov, 1985

Species of gastropod

Propebela margaritae is a species of sea snail, a marine gastropod mollusk in the family Mangeliidae.

== Description ==
The length of the shell varies between 5.5 mm and 12.5 mm.

== Distribution ==
This marine species occurs off Bering Island.
