= Propebela subvitrea =

Scientific classification
- Kingdom: Animalia
- Phylum: Mollusca
- Class: Gastropoda
- Subclass: Caenogastropoda
- Order: Neogastropoda
- Superfamily: Conoidea
- Family: Mangeliidae
- Genus: Propebela
- Species: P. subvitrea

Binomial name
- Propebela subvitrea (A. E. Verrill, 1884)

Synonyms
- Bela subvitrea Verrill, 1884; Oenopota subvitrea (A. E. Verrill, 1884)

Species of gastropod

Propebela subvitrea is a species of sea snail, a marine gastropod mollusk in the family Mangeliidae.

== Description ==
The shell length is up to 13.5 mm. It is translucent, white, thin but firm. It has a fusiform shape. It is moderately stout, with a high, regularly tapered, acute spire, consisting of about six rounded whorls. These are crossed by rather thin, prominent ribs, strongly bent in a sigmoid curve, and having on the lower whorls a rather faint spiral sculpture. The shell shows four to five whorls below the protoconch. These are strongly convex and a little swollen at the rounded shoulder, which is rarely somewhat angulated, and without a definite subsutural band. The suture is strongly impressed, the upper part of the whorl rising rather abruptly from it.

The protoconch consists of about two small, prominent whorls. The first is small, rounded, slightly mamilliform, and a little prominent. The next, constituting the greater part of the protoconch, increases rapidly and is decidedly prominent and somewhat obliquely placed, and bears about four or five raised, revolving lines, which are sometimes crossed by distinct lines of growth. The suture between the last protoconch whorl and the next is strongly marked and more oblique than any of the others. The remaining whorls are crossed by rather conspicuous, sharp, and rather elevated ribs. These are strongly excurved at and just above the shoulder, curving forward rapidly to the suture, and bending forward more gradually below the shoulder, forming a distinct sigmoid curve.

The interspaces between the ribs are much wider than the ribs themselves, distinctly concave, and crossed by rather feeble cinguli, which arc usually not apparent on the ribs themselves. On the upper whorls the spiral lines are usually more conspicuous than on the lower ones, but are often indicated chiefly by rather close, shallow furrows. On the body whorl the ribs extend to the base of the siphonal canal before they fade out, and the spiral sculpture becomes coarser and a little more evident on its anterior part and on the canal. The surface is also a little roughened by faint lines of growth, parallel with the ribs.

The aperture is oblong-ovate, rather narrow. The outer lip is sharp, thin, projecting forward in the middle in a broadly rounded curve, and slightly receding just above the shoulder, so as to form a broad and shallow sinus a little removed from the suture. The siphonal canal is nearly straight, a little prolonged, distinctly constricted at its base by the incurvature of the outer lip. The columella is straight, tapering anteriorly, its inner edge forming a well-marked sigmoid curve.

The epidermis is indistinct. The color of the shell is translucent bluish white. The surface is not glossy, but the texture is more vitreous and delicate than in the more northern and shallow-water species of Propebela.

== Distribution ==
This marine species occurs off North Carolina, United States.
