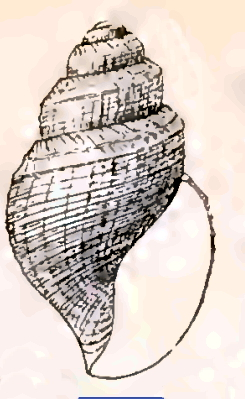
- Original image of a shell of Curtitoma hebes

Scientific classification
- Kingdom: Animalia
- Phylum: Mollusca
- Class: Gastropoda
- Subclass: Caenogastropoda
- Order: Neogastropoda
- Superfamily: Conoidea
- Family: Mangeliidae
- Genus: Curtitoma
- Species: C. hebes

Binomial name
- Curtitoma hebes (Verrill, 1880)

Synonyms
- Bela hebes Verrill, 1880

= Curtitoma hebes =

Species of gastropod

Curtitoma hebes is a species of sea snail, a marine gastropod mollusk in the family Mangeliidae.

== Description ==
The length of the shell varies between 6 mm and 9 mm.

(Original description) The shell has a short-fusiform or subovate shape, with a short, blunt spire, and with five or six convex, but slightly angled or carinated whorls, which have a slightly flattened subsutural band. The suture is impressed and slightly channelled. The sculpture shows numerous small, regular, raised, spiral ridges, separated by wider grooves. Usually one, just below the subsutural band, is stronger and more raised, forming a slight carina. On the subsutural band they are faint, or indistinct. The spiral lines are often decussated, more or less, by equally slender, transverse, raised riblets, coincident with the lines of growth, but not uniformly present. These may produce a slightly cancellated structure, on all the whorls, and extend as curved riblets, across the subsutural band. The whorls of the protoconch are not preserved in any of the holotype specimens. The aperture is short and narrow-ovate. The outer lip is expanded below the suture, then regularly rounded and thin. The posterior sinus is broad and shallow. The straight siphonal canal is very short and rather broad. The columella is sigmoid and regularly incurved. The epidermis is thin and greenish white.

== Distribution ==
This species is amphiboreal and occurs in the Northwest Atlantic Ocean and the Gulf of Maine; also reported from the Sea of Japan; found at depths between 100 m and 1320 m.
