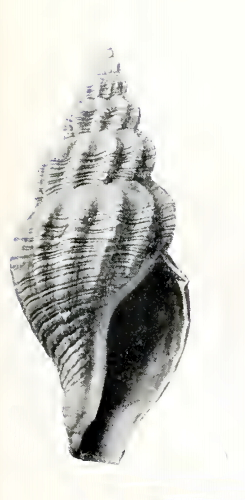
- Original image of a shell of Propebela alitakensis

Scientific classification
- Kingdom: Animalia
- Phylum: Mollusca
- Class: Gastropoda
- Subclass: Caenogastropoda
- Order: Neogastropoda
- Superfamily: Conoidea
- Family: Mangeliidae
- Genus: Propebela
- Species: P. alitakensis

Binomial name
- Propebela alitakensis (Dall, 1919)

Synonyms
- Canetoma alitakensis (Dall, W.H., 1919); Lora alitakensis Dall, 1919 (original description)

= Propebela alitakensis =

Species of gastropod

Propebela alitakensis is a species of sea snail, a marine gastropod mollusk in the family Mangeliidae.

== Description ==
The length of the shell attains 20 mm, its diameter 7 mm.

(Original description) The thin shell is pale yellowish, with touches of reddish brown on the prominences. It contains about six whorls, the protoconch is eroded. The suture is distinct. The axial sculpture consists of (on the body whorl 14) sigmoid ribs which cross the whorls and reach the siphonal canal with subequal interspaces. The spiral sculpture shows narrow channeled grooves with wider flattish interspaces often divided by a central feebler groove. These cover the whole surface. The aperture is simple. The white inner lip is erased. The short siphonal canal is very slightly recurved.

== Distribution ==
This marine species was found off Unimak Island, Aleutians, Alaska, USA
