= Propebela smithi =

Scientific classification
- Kingdom: Animalia
- Phylum: Mollusca
- Class: Gastropoda
- Subclass: Caenogastropoda
- Order: Neogastropoda
- Superfamily: Conoidea
- Family: Mangeliidae
- Genus: Propebela
- Species: P. smithi

Binomial name
- Propebela smithi Bartsch, 1944

Synonyms
- Propebela (Turritoma) smithi P. Bartsch, 1944

Species of gastropod

Propebela smithi is a species of sea snail. It is a marine gastropod mollusk in the family Mangeliidae.

== Description ==
The length of the shell attains 9.5 mm, its diameter 4.3 mm.

== Distribution ==
This marine species was found off Monterey Bay, California
