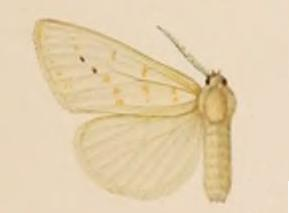
- Procanthia nivea

Scientific classification
- Domain: Eukaryota
- Kingdom: Animalia
- Phylum: Arthropoda
- Class: Insecta
- Order: Lepidoptera
- Superfamily: Noctuoidea
- Family: Erebidae
- Subfamily: Arctiinae
- Genus: Procanthia; Hampson, 1900

Type species
- Procanthia argentea Hampson, 1900

= Procanthia =

Genus of moths

Procanthia is a genus of moths in the subfamily Arctiinae. The genus was erected by George Hampson in 1900.

== Species ==
- Procanthia distantii (Dewitz, 1881)
- Procanthia nivea Rothschild, 1910
