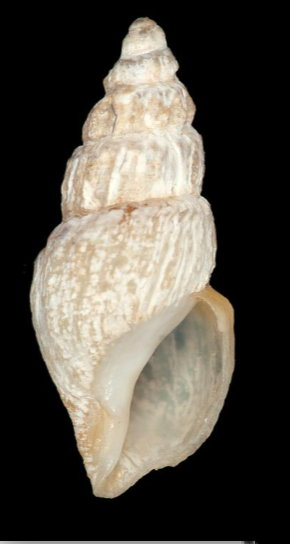
- Shell of Curtitoma fiora (holotype at the Smithsonian Institution)

Scientific classification
- Kingdom: Animalia
- Phylum: Mollusca
- Class: Gastropoda
- Subclass: Caenogastropoda
- Order: Neogastropoda
- Superfamily: Conoidea
- Family: Mangeliidae
- Genus: Curtitoma
- Species: C. fiora

Binomial name
- Curtitoma fiora (Dall, 1919)

Synonyms
- Lora fiora Dall, 1919

= Curtitoma fiora =

Species of gastropod

Curtitoma fiora is a species of sea snail, a marine gastropod mollusk in the family Mangeliidae.

== Description ==
The length of the shell attains 11 mm.

(Original description) The small shell is grayish white. It is acute, with a small subglobular protoconch and six subsequent whorls moderately rounded and with a slight shoulder. The suture is distinct, not appressed. The spiral sculpture consists of (on the penultimate whorl in front of the shoulder about 6) incised lines, with wider interspaces, overrunnuig the ribs. On the body whorl this sculpture extends to the siphonal canal . The axial sculpture consists of (on the body whorl about 17) short, rounded ribs extending from the shoulder, where they are most prominent, over the periphery and obsolete on the base. There are also fairly distinct incremental lines. The aperture is short, wide, with a feeble anal sulcus and hardly differentiated canal. The outer lip is thin and simple. The inner lip is erased. The throat is whitish.

== Distribution ==
The marine species occurs off the Aleutians.
