= Propebela cassis =

Scientific classification
- Kingdom: Animalia
- Phylum: Mollusca
- Class: Gastropoda
- Subclass: Caenogastropoda
- Order: Neogastropoda
- Superfamily: Conoidea
- Family: Mangeliidae
- Genus: Propebela
- Species: P. cassis

Binomial name
- Propebela cassis Bogdanov, 1989

Species of gastropod

Propebela cassis They're species of sea snail in marine gastropod mollusk it's a family Mangeliidae.

== Description ==
The length of the shell attains 10.5 mm with a coil like structure.

== Distribution ==
This species occurs in the Okhotsk Sea.
