= Propebela marinae =

Scientific classification
- Kingdom: Animalia
- Phylum: Mollusca
- Class: Gastropoda
- Subclass: Caenogastropoda
- Order: Neogastropoda
- Superfamily: Conoidea
- Family: Mangeliidae
- Genus: Propebela
- Species: P. marinae

Binomial name
- Propebela marinae Bogdanov, 1989

Synonyms
- Canetoma marinae (Bogdanov, 1989)

Species of gastropod

Propebela marinae is a species of sea snail, a marine gastropod mollusk in the family Mangeliidae.

== Description ==
The length of the shell varies between 7 mm and 11 mm.

== Distribution ==
This species occurs in the Okhotsk Sea.
