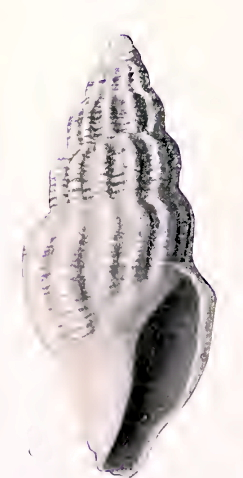
- Original image of a shell of Propebela popovia

Scientific classification
- Kingdom: Animalia
- Phylum: Mollusca
- Class: Gastropoda
- Subclass: Caenogastropoda
- Order: Neogastropoda
- Superfamily: Conoidea
- Family: Mangeliidae
- Genus: Propebela
- Species: P. popovia

Binomial name
- Propebela popovia (Dall, 1919)

Synonyms
- Lora popovia Dall, 1919 (original description)

= Propebela popovia =

Species of gastropod

Propebela popovia is a species of sea snail, a marine gastropod mollusk in the family Mangeliidae.

== Description ==
The length of the shell attains 13 mm, its diameter 5.5 mm.

(Original description) The white shell shows a straw-colored periostracum. It consists of six shouldered whorls, a subglobular small protoconch, and a distinct suture. The spiral sculpture consists of (on the upper whorl four or five) rounded threads, between the shoulder and the succeeding suture. The threading is obsolete on the body whorl or reduced to fine striation on the base and on the siphonal canal. The axial sculpture on the spire consists of about 16 short rounded ribs swollen at the shoulder and reaching the succeeding suture, but fainter on the body whorl and absent from the base. The aperture is simple. The columella is white and erased. The siphonal canal is short and straight.

== Distribution ==
This marine species was found from Bristol Bay, Bering Sea, to Monterey Bay, California, USA.
