= Curtitoma neymanae =

Scientific classification
- Kingdom: Animalia
- Phylum: Mollusca
- Class: Gastropoda
- Subclass: Caenogastropoda
- Order: Neogastropoda
- Superfamily: Conoidea
- Family: Mangeliidae
- Genus: Curtitoma
- Species: C. neymanae

Binomial name
- Curtitoma neymanae I.P. Bogdanov, 1989

Species of gastropod

Curtitoma neymanae is a species of sea snail, a marine gastropod mollusk in the family Mangeliidae.

== Description ==
The length of the shell varies between 6 mm and 7 mm.

== Distribution ==
This marine species occurs in the Sea of Japan.
