= Propebela subtrophonoidea =

Scientific classification
- Kingdom: Animalia
- Phylum: Mollusca
- Class: Gastropoda
- Subclass: Caenogastropoda
- Order: Neogastropoda
- Superfamily: Conoidea
- Family: Mangeliidae
- Genus: Propebela
- Species: P. subtrophonoidea

Binomial name
- Propebela subtrophonoidea (Okutani, 1964)

Synonyms
- Benthomangelia subtrophonoidea Okutani, 1964 (basionym)

Species of gastropod

Propebela subtrophonoidea is a species of sea snail, a marine gastropod mollusk in the family Mangeliidae.

== Distribution ==
This species occurs in the Sea of Japan.
