= Propebela tersa =

Scientific classification
- Kingdom: Animalia
- Phylum: Mollusca
- Class: Gastropoda
- Subclass: Caenogastropoda
- Order: Neogastropoda
- Superfamily: Conoidea
- Family: Mangeliidae
- Genus: Propebela
- Species: P. tersa

Binomial name
- Propebela tersa (Bartsch, 1941)

Synonyms
- Canetoma tersa Bartsch, 1941 (original combination)

Species of gastropod

Propebela tersa is a species of sea snail, a marine gastropod mollusk in the family Mangeliidae.

== Description ==
The length of the shell varies between 6 mm and 12 mm.

== Habitat ==
Propebela tersa primarily lives in brackish water.

== Distribution ==
This species occurs in the Okhotsk Sea and the Sea of Japan.
