= Curtitoma georgossiani =

Scientific classification
- Kingdom: Animalia
- Phylum: Mollusca
- Class: Gastropoda
- Subclass: Caenogastropoda
- Order: Neogastropoda
- Superfamily: Conoidea
- Family: Mangeliidae
- Genus: Curtitoma
- Species: C. georgоssiani

Binomial name
- Curtitoma georgоssiani Merkuljev, 2017

Species of gastropod

Curtitoma georgоssiani is a species of sea snail, a marine gastropod mollusc in the family Mangeliidae.

== Distribution ==
This marine species occurs in the Barents Sea.
