= Propebela exquisita =

Scientific classification
- Kingdom: Animalia
- Phylum: Mollusca
- Class: Gastropoda
- Subclass: Caenogastropoda
- Order: Neogastropoda
- Superfamily: Conoidea
- Family: Mangeliidae
- Genus: Propebela
- Species: P. exquisita

Binomial name
- Propebela exquisita Bartsch, 1941

Synonyms
- Oenopota exquisita Bartsch, 1941; Propebela (Turritoma) exquisita Bartsch, 1914; Propebela venusta Okutani, 1964

Species of gastropod

Propebela exquisita is a species of sea snail, a marine gastropod mollusk in the family Mangeliidae.

== Description ==
The length of the shell varies between 8 mm and 20 mm.

== Distribution ==
This species occurs in the Sea of Japan.
