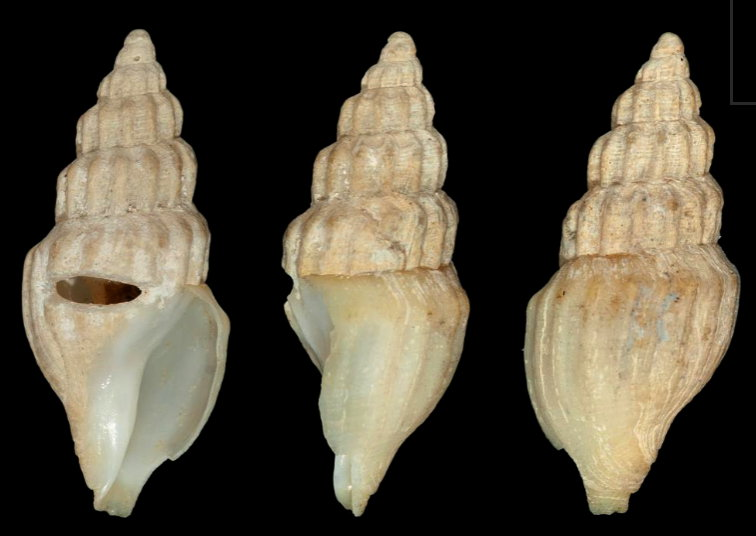
- Shell of Propebela rassina (holotype at the Smithsonian Institution)

Scientific classification
- Kingdom: Animalia
- Phylum: Mollusca
- Class: Gastropoda
- Subclass: Caenogastropoda
- Order: Neogastropoda
- Superfamily: Conoidea
- Family: Mangeliidae
- Genus: Propebela
- Species: P. rassina

Binomial name
- Propebela rassina (Dall, 1919)

Synonyms
- Lora rassina Dall, 1919 (original description)

= Propebela rassina =

Species of gastropod

Propebela rassina is a species of sea snail, a marine gastropod mollusk in the family Conidae, the cone snails and their allies.

== Description ==
The length of the shell varies between 7 mm and 11 mm.

(Original description) The small shell is white. It shows a small (decorticated) whorl in the protoconch and five subsequent slightly shouldered whorls. The suture is distinct, not appressed. The axial sculpture consists of (on the body whorl about 20) narrow, rounded ribs extending from the suture over the periphery but more or less obsolete on the base. The interspaces are wider. The spiral sculpture consists of numerous close-set rounded threads over the whole surface but not nodulating the ribs. The anal sulcus is very shallow. The outer lip is thin, nearly straight. The inner lip is erased. The siphonal canal is very short, hardly differentiated from the aperture.

== Distribution ==
This species occurs in the Bering Sea.
