= Propebela goryachevi =

Scientific classification
- Kingdom: Animalia
- Phylum: Mollusca
- Class: Gastropoda
- Subclass: Caenogastropoda
- Order: Neogastropoda
- Superfamily: Conoidea
- Family: Mangeliidae
- Genus: Propebela
- Species: P. goryachevi

Binomial name
- Propebela goryachevi Bogdanov, 1989

Species of gastropod

Propebela goryachevi is a species of sea snail, a marine gastropod mollusk in the family Mangeliidae. It was named after Russian malacologist Vyacheslav Goryachev.

It is only described in one scientific paper, which is not currently available.

== Description ==
P. goryachevi is a benthic predator.

The length of the shell varies between 5.5 mm and 11 mm.

== Distribution ==
This species was discovered in 1989 in the Sea of Japan.
