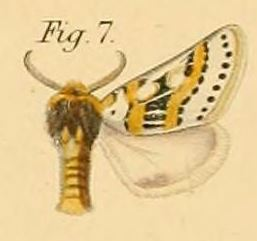

Scientific classification
- Domain: Eukaryota
- Kingdom: Animalia
- Phylum: Arthropoda
- Class: Insecta
- Order: Lepidoptera
- Superfamily: Noctuoidea
- Family: Erebidae
- Subfamily: Arctiinae
- Genus: Procanthia
- Species: P. distantii

Binomial name
- Procanthia distantii (Dewitz, 1881)

Synonyms
- Lacipa distanti Dewitz, 1881; Procanthia argentea Hampson, 1900

= Procanthia distantii =

Species of moth

Procanthia distantii is a moth in the subfamily Arctiinae. It was described by Hermann Dewitz in 1881. It is found in South Africa.
