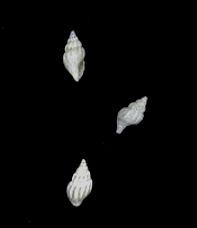
- Shells of Propebela rufa (museum specimens at Naturalis Biodiversity Center)

Scientific classification
- Domain: Eukaryota
- Kingdom: Animalia
- Phylum: Mollusca
- Class: Gastropoda
- Subclass: Caenogastropoda
- Order: Neogastropoda
- Superfamily: Conoidea
- Family: Mangeliidae
- Genus: Propebela
- Species: P. rufa

Binomial name
- Propebela rufa (Montagu, 1803)

Synonyms
- Bellaspira rufa (Montagu, 1803); Fusus cranchii T. Brown, 1827; Murex chordula Turton, 1819; Murex rufus Montagu, 1803 (original combination); Oenopota pyramidalis bretannica Nordsieck, 1977; Oenopota rufa (Montagu, 1803); Pleurotoma rufa (Montagu, 1803); Pleurotoma rufa var. angusta Jeffreys, 1867; Pleurotoma rufa var. lactea Jeffreys, 1867; Pleurotoma rufa var. semicostata Jeffreys, 1867; Pleurotoma ulideana [sic] ((misspelling)); Pleurotoma ulidiana Thompson W., 1845

= Propebela rufa =

Species of gastropod

Propebela rufa, common name the red conelet, is a species of sea snail, a marine gastropod mollusk in the family Conidae, the cone snails and their allies.

== Description ==
The length of the shell varies between 5 mm and 13 mm.

The shell contains 7 whorls. These are rather convex and very slightly shouldered. The 14 or 15 ribs are narrower than the interstices. The surface is covered with fine close revolving striae. The color of the shell is chocolate-brown, the ribs are lighter colored.

== Distribution ==
This marine species occurs off the Southwest British Isles and Northern France.
