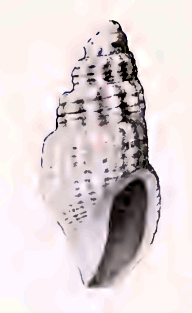
- Original image of a shell of Propebela miona

Scientific classification
- Kingdom: Animalia
- Phylum: Mollusca
- Class: Gastropoda
- Subclass: Caenogastropoda
- Order: Neogastropoda
- Superfamily: Conoidea
- Family: Mangeliidae
- Genus: Propebela
- Species: P. miona

Binomial name
- Propebela miona (Dall, 1919)

Synonyms
- Lora miona Dall, 1919 (original description); Obesotoma miona (Dall, W.H., 1919)

= Propebela miona =

Species of gastropod

Propebela miona is a species of sea snail, a marine gastropod mollusk in the family Conidae, the cone snails and their allies.

== Description ==
The length of the shell attains 8 mm, its diameter 3.5 mm.

(Original description) The white, small shell is roundly shouldered with a rather coarse sculpture on the spire, which becomes obsolete on the body whorl. The axial sculpture consists of (on the penultimate whorl 13) rounded irregular ribs with subequal interspaces. The ribs are nodulate by the intersection of three or four rather strong spiral cords with narrower interspaces. On the body whorl the ribs are obsolete and the spiral sculpture feebler, flatter, and with occasional intercalary smaller threads. The anal fasciole and the anal sulcus are obscure. The aperture is narrow. The inner lip is erased. The siphonal canal is short.

== Distribution ==
Tis marine species occurs from Sitka Island, Alaska to Puget Sound.
