= Propebela diomedea =

Scientific classification
- Kingdom: Animalia
- Phylum: Mollusca
- Class: Gastropoda
- Subclass: Caenogastropoda
- Order: Neogastropoda
- Superfamily: Conoidea
- Family: Mangeliidae
- Genus: Propebela
- Species: P. diomedea

Binomial name
- Propebela diomedea Bartsch, 1944

Synonyms
- Propebela (Turritoma) diomedea P. Bartsch, 1944

Species of gastropod

Propebela diomedea is a species of sea snail, a marine gastropod mollusk in the family Mangeliidae.

== Description ==
The length of the shell attains 9.9 mm, its diameter is 5 mm.

== Distribution ==
This marine species was found off Monterey Bay, California.
