= Propebela eurybia =

Scientific classification
- Kingdom: Animalia
- Phylum: Mollusca
- Class: Gastropoda
- Subclass: Caenogastropoda
- Order: Neogastropoda
- Superfamily: Conoidea
- Family: Mangeliidae
- Genus: Propebela
- Species: P. eurybia

Binomial name
- Propebela eurybia (Bartsch, 1941)

Synonyms
- Canetoma eurybia (Bartsch, 1941); Funitoma (Cestoma) eurybia Bartsch, 1941

Species of gastropod

Propebela eurybia is a species of sea snail, a marine gastropod mollusk in the family Mangeliidae,.

== Description ==
The length of the shell attains 7.4 mm, its diameter is 2.8 mm.

== Distribution ==
This species occurs in the Sea of Japan.
