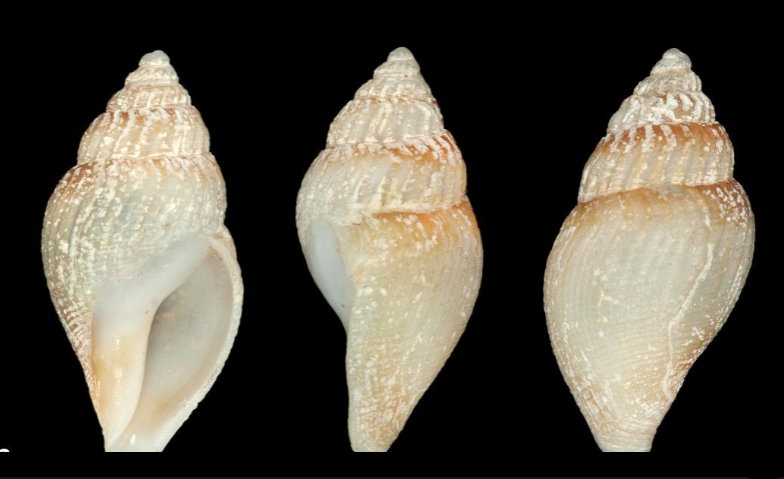
- Shell of Curtitoma lawrenciana (holotype at the Smithsonian Institution)

Scientific classification
- Kingdom: Animalia
- Phylum: Mollusca
- Class: Gastropoda
- Subclass: Caenogastropoda
- Order: Neogastropoda
- Superfamily: Conoidea
- Family: Mangeliidae
- Genus: Curtitoma
- Species: C. lawrenciana

Binomial name
- Curtitoma lawrenciana (Dall, 1919)

Synonyms
- Bela tenuilirata Krause, 1886 (not Dall, 1871); Lora lawrenciana Dall, 1919; Lora nazanensis Dall, 1919

= Curtitoma lawrenciana =

Species of gastropod

Curtitoma lawrenciana is a species of sea snail, a marine gastropod mollusk in the family Mangeliidae.

== Description ==
The length of the shell varies between 6 mm and 18 mm.

== Distribution ==
This species occurs in the Chukchi Sea, Northeast Russia, Russia, in the northern part of the Sea of Japan and off the Aleutians; found at depths between 62 m and 800 m.
