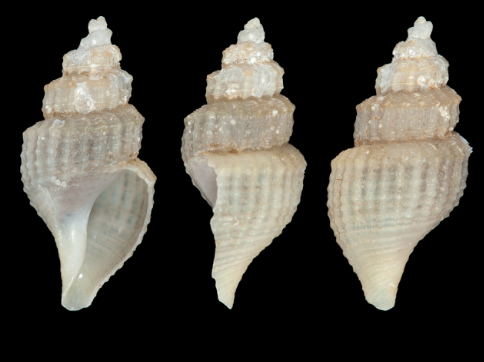
- Shell of Propebela concinnula (holotype at the Smithsonian Institution)

Scientific classification
- Kingdom: Animalia
- Phylum: Mollusca
- Class: Gastropoda
- Subclass: Caenogastropoda
- Order: Neogastropoda
- Superfamily: Conoidea
- Family: Mangeliidae
- Genus: Propebela
- Species: P. concinnula

Binomial name
- Propebela concinnula (A. E. Verrill, 1882)

Synonyms
- Bela concinnula Verrill, 1882; Bela mitrula concinnula (A. E. Verrill, 1882); Oenopota concinnula (A. E. Verrill, 1882)

= Propebela concinnula =

Species of gastropod

Propebela concinnula is a species of sea snail, a marine gastropod mollusk in the family Mangeliidae.

== Description ==
The length of the shell varies between 7.5 mm and 12.5 mm (0.30–0.49 in).

(Original description) The shell is rather small and delicate. It is long-ovate, regularly turreted and contains about six whorls. These rise almost at right angles from the suture, and have an angular, or squarish, nodulous shoulder, usually distinctly carinated by a thin, raised, spiral keel, which forms small, but prominent nodules where it crosses the ribs. Below the shoulder, the whorls are abruptly flattened. The subsutural band is usually little convex, or nearly flat. The ribs are numerous (often 20 to 25) regular, nearly straight below the shoulder, but rounded, separated by concave intervals of equal or greater width. They extend entirely across the upper whorls, but fade out below the middle of the body whorl. Above the shoulder they are slightly excurved, and smaller across the subsutural band. The whole surface is covered with regular and rather strong, rounded, elevated, revolving cinguli, which cross the ribs and produce on them small, rounded nodes. They give a pretty regularly and rather finely but strongly cancellated appearance to the whole surface. On the penultimate whorl there are four or live cinguli below the angle. The abruptly flattened subsutural hand, above the shoulder, is covered with numerous much finer and closer revolving.lines. On the anterior part of the body whorl the cinguli are rather stronger than on the middle, and separated by wider grooves, but they are only slightly roughened by the lines of growth. On the siphonal canal they become finer and closer. Between the carina and the base of the canal there are 12 to 14 cinguli. 'I'he protoconch is small and regular; at first smooth, then two raised spiral lines begin on the first whorl, and soon become distinct carinae. On the second to third whorl, the upper one forming the shoulder; slender transverse riblets begin on the second, and become very evident on the third whorl. The aperture is narrow-ovate, angulated posteriorly. The sinus is broad and shallow. The outer lip, in front of the sinus, is distinctly flattened, then broadly rounded, very slightly incurved at the base of the siphonal canal, which is narrow, a little produced, and slightly curved. The columella is decidedly sigmoid, its inner edge excurved at the end. The color of the shell is white, or pale greenish white, covered with a thin, pale green epidermis.

The tentacles are short and obtuse in alcoholic specimens, with conspicuous black eyes. The penis is relatively large, bent back in a sigmoid form, flattened, broadest in the middle, and tapering. The uncini are linear, very acute, relatively large, long, slender, curved, with a short ovate basal appendage.

== Distribution ==
This common marine species occurs in the Sea of Japan and off Labrador, Canada to Massachusetts, United States.
