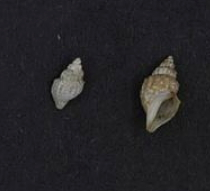
- Shells of Propebela assimilis (museum specimens at Naturalis Biodiversity Center)

Scientific classification
- Kingdom: Animalia
- Phylum: Mollusca
- Class: Gastropoda
- Subclass: Caenogastropoda
- Order: Neogastropoda
- Superfamily: Conoidea
- Family: Mangeliidae
- Genus: Propebela
- Species: P. assimilis

Binomial name
- Propebela assimilis (Sars G.O., 1878)

Synonyms
- Bela assimilis Sars G. O., 1878; Lora assimilis (Sars G.O., 1878); Oenopota assimilis (Sars G.O., 1878)

= Propebela assimilis =

Species of gastropod

Propebela assimilis is a species of sea snail, a marine gastropod mollusk in the family Mangeliidae.

== Description ==
The length of the shell varies between 7 mm and 25 mm.

== Distribution ==
This marine species occurs in the Sea of Japan; off the Lofotens and Arctic Norway
