= Curtitoma becklemishevi =

Scientific classification
- Kingdom: Animalia
- Phylum: Mollusca
- Class: Gastropoda
- Subclass: Caenogastropoda
- Order: Neogastropoda
- Superfamily: Conoidea
- Family: Mangeliidae
- Genus: Curtitoma
- Species: C. becklemishevi

Binomial name
- Curtitoma becklemishevi I.P. Bogdanov, 1989

Species of gastropod

Curtitoma becklemishevi is a species of sea snail, a marine gastropod mollusk in the family Mangeliidae.

== Description ==
The length of the shell varies between 5 mm and 8 mm.

== Distribution ==
This marine species occurs in the Sea of Japan and in the Okhotsk Sea.
