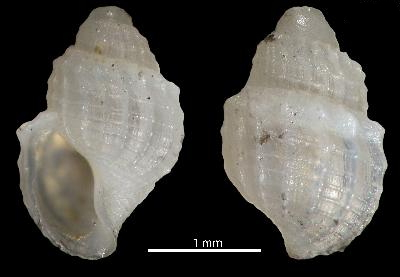
- Shell of Curtitoma contraria (paratype in the MNHN, Paris)

Scientific classification
- Kingdom: Animalia
- Phylum: Mollusca
- Class: Gastropoda
- Subclass: Caenogastropoda
- Order: Neogastropoda
- Superfamily: Conoidea
- Family: Mangeliidae
- Genus: Curtitoma
- Species: C. contraria

Binomial name
- Curtitoma contraria Bonfitto & Morassi, 2012

= Curtitoma contraria =

Species of gastropod

Curtitoma contraria is a species of small sea snail, a marine gastropod mollusc in the family Mangeliidae. The species was first described in 2012 by Andrea Bonfitto and Marco Morassi based on specimens collected off northeastern Taiwan. It is the first sinistral, or left coiling species reported in the family Mangeliidae.

== Description ==
The shell is sinistral, solid, and ovate cylindrical in shape. Adults shells reach a maximum length of 3.6 mm and a diameter of 1.9 mm. The teleoconch consists of approximately 2.5 whorls, angularly shouldered above mid whorl. The suture is distinct and bordered by a spiral cord.

The axial sculpture consists of 14 to 17 narrow, slightly opisthocline ribs on the penultimate and last whorls. These ribs are crossed by widely spaced spiral cords, forming nodules at the points of intersection, especially along the shoulder cord. The last whorl bears four spiral cords, and the base is sculptured with 10 to 12 spiral cords.

The aperture is somewhat oblanceolate to subrectangular and moderately bent at the siphonal canal. The outer lip is thin and bears a distinct anal sinus, with its deepest point at the middle of the satural ramp. The columella is short and twisted. A shallow but distinct pseudoumbilicus is present between the abapical end of the inner lip and the spiphonal canal.

The protoconch is domed and consists of 1.5 whorls, sculptured with fine spiral threads and axial riblets. The shell is glossy yellowish white when fresh.

The most distinctive feature of the species is its sinistral shell coiling. In contrast to the predominantly dextral orientation observed in Mangeliidae, the shell of Curtitoma contraria coils to the left. The aperture is narrow and elongate, with a short siphonal canal. The outer lip is thin.

The Curtitoma contraria has a benthos functional group, and is a predator.

== Biology ==
Curtitoma contraria is a benthic marine species. Members of Mangeliidae are carnivorous and are generally regarded as predatory gastropods that feed on small invertebrates.

== Distribution ==
This marine species occurs off Taiwan.
