= Propebela rathbuni =

Scientific classification
- Kingdom: Animalia
- Phylum: Mollusca
- Class: Gastropoda
- Subclass: Caenogastropoda
- Order: Neogastropoda
- Superfamily: Conoidea
- Family: Mangeliidae
- Genus: Propebela
- Species: P. rathbuni

Binomial name
- Propebela rathbuni (Verrill, 1884)

Synonyms
- Bela rathbuni Verrill, 1884; Oenopota rathbuni (Verrill, 1884)

Species of gastropod

Propebela rathbuni is a species of sea snail, a marine gastropod mollusk in the family Mangeliidae.

== Description ==
The length of the shell attains 27 mm, its diameter 13 mm.

(Original description) The large shell is rather stout. It has a subfusiform shape with an elevated acute spire, forming more than half the total length of the shell. It contains 7 whorls besides the protoconch,. These are moderately convex, with an impressed, not very oblique suture. The whorls of the spire are pretty strongly angulated or carinated a little above the middle by a revolving carina, which appears double at the summit, and slightly nodulous where it is crossed by the longitudinal lines. Above the carina there is a rather wide, sloping, flattened or slightly concave subsutural band, which is crossed by somewhat raised, moderately excurved lamellae, parallel with the lines of growth and with the sinus in the lip. There is also a rather faint revolving cingulus a little below the middle of the band. Below the principal carina there is a rather wide concave interspace, which surrounds the middle or most prominent part of the whorls, and is bounded below by a carina like the upper one, but not quite so strong. Anterior to this there are, on the body whorl and siphon, numerous similar double revolving cinguli, decreasing in size and becoming closer anteriorly. Of these there aire about twelve above the base of the siphonal canal. The concave interspaces between the upper ones are about equal in width to the cinguli. The whole surface is covered by numerous slightly raised, longitudinal lines, which are parallel with the lines of growth and are most conspicuous in the interspaces between the cinguli. The apex, in our single specimen, is badly eroded. The aperture is narrow-ovate, not very large, with a distinct obtuse angle at the base of the columella, which is rather short and nearly straight. The siphonal canal is short and straight, distinguished from the body whorl only by a slight undulation. The siphonal canal is short, straight and rather open.

The single specimen of this species is considerably eroded, so that the sculpture, especially the longitudinal lines, appears more strongly marked than it would in a fresh specimen. Perhaps the double character of the revolving carinae is more obvious for the same reason. They may originally have been more elevated and sharper.

== Distribution ==
This marine species was found in the Chesapeake Bay, Virginia, United States.
