= Propebela siogamaensis =

Scientific classification
- Kingdom: Animalia
- Phylum: Mollusca
- Class: Gastropoda
- Subclass: Caenogastropoda
- Order: Neogastropoda
- Superfamily: Conoidea
- Family: Mangeliidae
- Genus: Propebela
- Species: P. siogamaensis

Binomial name
- Propebela siogamaensis (Nomura & Zinbo, 1940)

Synonyms
- Funitoma (Cestoma) siogamaensis Nomura, S. & N. Zinbo, 1940; Lora siogamaensis Nomura & Zinbo, 1940

Species of gastropod

Propebela siogamaensis is a species of sea snail, a marine gastropod mollusk in the family Mangeliidae.

== Distribution ==
This species occurs in the Sea of Japan
