= Plicisyrinx binicostata =

Scientific classification
- Kingdom: Animalia
- Phylum: Mollusca
- Class: Gastropoda
- Subclass: Caenogastropoda
- Order: Neogastropoda
- Superfamily: Conoidea
- Family: Pseudomelatomidae
- Genus: Plicisyrinx
- Species: P. binicostata

Binomial name
- Plicisyrinx binicostata Sysoev & Kantor, 1986

Species of gastropod

Plicisyrinx binicostata is a species of sea snail, a marine gastropod mollusk in the family Pseudomelatomidae, the turrids and allies.

== Distribution ==
This marine species was discovered in the Kurile-Kamchatka Trench, in the Northern Pacific Ocean.
