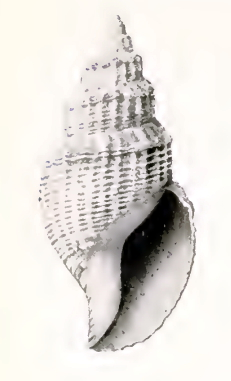
- Original image of a shell of Propebela mitrata

Scientific classification
- Kingdom: Animalia
- Phylum: Mollusca
- Class: Gastropoda
- Subclass: Caenogastropoda
- Order: Neogastropoda
- Superfamily: Conoidea
- Family: Mangeliidae
- Genus: Propebela
- Species: P. mitrata

Binomial name
- Propebela mitrata (Dall, 1919)

Synonyms
- Lora mitrata Dall, 1919 (original description); Canetoma mitrata (Dall, W.H., 1919)

= Propebela mitrata =

Species of mollusc

Propebela mitrata is a species of sea snail, a marine gastropod mollusk in the family Conidae, the cone snails and their allies.

== Description ==
The length of the shell attains 24 mm, its diameter 11 mm.

(Original description) The shell resembles Obesotoma tenuilirata cimata, but with a sharper sculpture, higher spire, a shorter aperture, a more gyrate columella, and a darker color, especially on the keel at the shoulder.

== Distribution ==
The Propebela mitrata is typically found in the Eastern Pacific Ocean in the Sea of Japan and from Port Clarence, Bering Strait, to the Shumagin Islands, Alaska.
