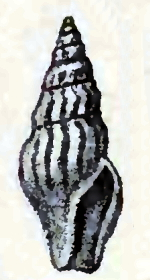
- Image of a shell of Curtitoma novajasemljensis

Scientific classification
- Kingdom: Animalia
- Phylum: Mollusca
- Class: Gastropoda
- Subclass: Caenogastropoda
- Order: Neogastropoda
- Superfamily: Conoidea
- Family: Mangeliidae
- Genus: Curtitoma
- Species: C. novajasemljensis

Binomial name
- Curtitoma novajasemljensis (Leche, 1878)

Synonyms
- Pleurotoma novajasemljensis Leche, 1878; Curtitoma novajasemliensis (Leche, 1878) (misspelling); Oenopota novajasemliensis (Leche, 1878) (currently placed in genus Curtitoma)

= Curtitoma novajasemljensis =

Species of gastropod

Curtitoma novajasemljensis is a species of sea snail, a marine gastropod mollusk in the family Mangeliidae.

== Description ==
The length of the shell varies between 4.9 mm and 33 mm.

The shell has a yellowish ash-color. It is finely and equally decussated by longitudinal and revolving lines. The whorls show a narrow shoulder.

== Distribution ==
This species occurs in European waters and in the Canadian Arctic waters; on the continental shelf of the Alaska, Beaufort Sea
