= Propebela profunda =

Scientific classification
- Kingdom: Animalia
- Phylum: Mollusca
- Class: Gastropoda
- Subclass: Caenogastropoda
- Order: Neogastropoda
- Superfamily: Conoidea
- Family: Mangeliidae
- Genus: Propebela
- Species: P. profunda

Binomial name
- Propebela profunda Castellanos & Landoni, 1993

Species of gastropod

Propebela profunda is a species of sea snail, a marine gastropod mollusk in the family Mangeliidae.

== Description ==
The length of the shell attains 8 mm.

== Distribution ==
This marine species occurs off Argentina and was found in the San Jorge Gulf, Santa Cruz Province at a depth of 600 m.
