= Propebela verrilli =

Scientific classification
- Kingdom: Animalia
- Phylum: Mollusca
- Class: Gastropoda
- Subclass: Caenogastropoda
- Order: Neogastropoda
- Superfamily: Conoidea
- Family: Mangeliidae
- Genus: Propebela
- Species: P. verrilli

Binomial name
- Propebela verrilli Bogdanov, 1989

Species of gastropod

Propebela verrilli is a species of sea snail, a marine gastropod mollusk in the family Mangeliidae.

== Description ==
The length of the shell varies between 9.5 mm and 12 mm.

== Distribution ==
This species has been found in the Sea of Japan.
