= Plicisyrinx =

Scientific classification
- Kingdom: Animalia
- Phylum: Mollusca
- Class: Gastropoda
- Subclass: Caenogastropoda
- Order: Neogastropoda
- Superfamily: Conoidea
- Family: Pseudomelatomidae
- Genus: Plicisyrinx; Sysoev & Kantor, 1986

Type species
- Plicisyrinx decapitata Sysoev & Kantor, 1986

Species
- See text

Genus of gastropods

Plicisyrinx is a genus of sea snails, marine gastropod mollusks in the family Pseudomelatomidae.

== Species ==
Species within the genus Plicisyrinx include:

- Plicisyrinx binicostata Sysoev & Kantor, 1986
- Plicisyrinx decapitata Sysoev & Kantor, 1986
- Plicisyrinx plicata (Okutani, 1964)
- Plicisyrinx vitjazi Sysoev & Kantor, 1986
