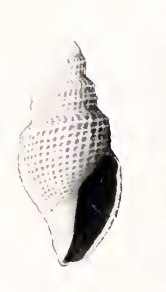
- Original image of a shell of Propebela pitysa

Scientific classification
- Kingdom: Animalia
- Phylum: Mollusca
- Class: Gastropoda
- Subclass: Caenogastropoda
- Order: Neogastropoda
- Superfamily: Conoidea
- Family: Mangeliidae
- Genus: Propebela
- Species: P. pitysa

Binomial name
- Propebela pitysa (Dall, 1919)

Synonyms
- Lora pitysa Dall, 1919 (original description)

= Propebela pitysa =

Species of gastropod

Propebela pitysa is a species of sea snail, a marine gastropod mollusk in the family Mangeliidae.

== Description ==
The length of the shell attains 5.5 mm, its diameter 2 mm.

(Original description) The small shell is translucent white. Its protoconch consists of a one sided subglobular smooth 1 1/2 whorl, followed by about four subsequent whorls. The suture is distinct. The anal fasciole slopes to a corded shoulder. The spiral sculpture begins by two strong cords, one of which marks the shoulder and to these are added by intercalation until the penultimate whorl has four and the body whorl fourteen, not counting the threads on the siphonal canal. These are reticulated by axial cords of similar size which do not form ribs or nodes though the posterior cord at the shoulder is slightly undulated. The anal sulcus is obscure. The aperture is simple. The inner lip is erased. The siphonal canal is short.

== Distribution ==
This marine species was found from Point Pinos to San Diego, California, US.
