= Propebela areta =

Scientific classification
- Kingdom: Animalia
- Phylum: Mollusca
- Class: Gastropoda
- Subclass: Caenogastropoda
- Order: Neogastropoda
- Superfamily: Conoidea
- Family: Mangeliidae
- Genus: Propebela
- Species: P. areta

Binomial name
- Propebela areta (Bartsch, 1941)

Synonyms
- Funitoma (Funitoma) areta Bartsch, 1941

Species of gastropod

Propebela areta is a species of sea snail, a marine gastropod mollusk in the family Mangeliidae.

== Description ==
The length of the shell attains 8.5 mm, its diameter 3.7 mm.

== Distribution ==
This species occurs in the Sea of Japan.

They can be found in rock and muddy sand.
