= Curtitoma piltuniensis =

Scientific classification
- Kingdom: Animalia
- Phylum: Mollusca
- Class: Gastropoda
- Subclass: Caenogastropoda
- Order: Neogastropoda
- Superfamily: Conoidea
- Family: Mangeliidae
- Genus: Curtitoma
- Species: C. piltuniensis

Binomial name
- Curtitoma piltuniensis (I.P. Bogdanov, 1985)

Synonyms
- Oenopota piltuniensis Bogdanov, 1985

Species of gastropod

Curtitoma piltuniensis is a species of sea snail, a marine gastropod mollusk in the family Mangeliidae.

== Description ==
The length of the shell attains 7.5 mm.

== Distribution ==
This marine species occurs off Sakhalin, in eastern Russia.
