= Curtitoma exquisita =

- Shell of Curtitoma exquisita (holotype)

Scientific classification
- Kingdom: Animalia
- Phylum: Mollusca
- Class: Gastropoda
- Subclass: Caenogastropoda
- Order: Neogastropoda
- Superfamily: Conoidea
- Family: Mangeliidae
- Genus: Curtitoma
- Species: C. exquisita

Binomial name
- Curtitoma exquisita (Yokoyama, 1926)

Synonyms
- Bela exquisita Yokoyama, 1926 (original combination)

Species of gastropod

Curtitoma exquisita is a species of sea snail, a marine gastropod mollusk in the family Mangeliidae.

== Description ==
The height of the shell attains 4.8 mm, and the diameter is 2.4 mm.

(Original description) The shell is small and ovato-fusiform. There are five whorls, of which one is embryonal and smooth; the remaining whorls are angulate in the middle, with the surface above the angle sloping and slightly concave, and below vertical and somewhat convex. They are longitudinally plicate and spirally striate; the plicae number about thirty on the body whorl. They are rounded, flatten towards their lower end, and are separated by valleys of less breadth; the spiral striae are fine and numerous. On the body whorl, the plicae become very faint towards the base. The aperture is elongated and subrhomboidal, with the outer lip sharp. The siphonal canal is short, wide, and slightly bent sideward.

== Distribution ==
This marine species occurs off Japan.
