= Propebela kyurokusimana =

Scientific classification
- Kingdom: Animalia
- Phylum: Mollusca
- Class: Gastropoda
- Subclass: Caenogastropoda
- Order: Neogastropoda
- Superfamily: Conoidea
- Family: Mangeliidae
- Genus: Propebela
- Species: P. kyurokusimana

Binomial name
- Propebela kyurokusimana (Nomura & Hatai, 1940)

Synonyms
- Canetoma kyurokusimana (Nomura, S. & N. Zinbo, 1940); Lora kyurokusimana Nomura & Hatai, 1940

Species of gastropod

Propebela kyurokusimana is a species of sea snail, a marine gastropod mollusk in the family Mangeliidae.

== Distribution ==
This species occurs in the Sea of Japan.
