= Propebela variabilis =

Scientific classification
- Kingdom: Animalia
- Phylum: Mollusca
- Class: Gastropoda
- Subclass: Caenogastropoda
- Order: Neogastropoda
- Superfamily: Conoidea
- Family: Mangeliidae
- Genus: Propebela
- Species: P. variabilis

Binomial name
- Propebela variabilis Bogdanov, 1990

Synonyms
- Canetoma variabilis (Bogdanov, 1985)

Species of gastropod

Propebela variabilis is a species of sea snail, a marine gastropod mollusk in the family Mangeliidae.

== Description ==
The spiraled shell appears white or off-white in color, with axial 1-3mm in size radiating from the apex of the shell, with much smaller spiral ribbing along the body whorl. When the internal portion of the shell is viewed through aperture (the shell opening), the shell appears thin and translucent, with a semi-open siphonal canal. The length of the shell varies between 9 mm and 14 mm.

== Distribution ==
This marine species occurs off Sakhalin, Eastern Russia. The first specimen denoted as a holotype was found in the Commander Islands, which is archived in the Zoological Institute of St. Petersburg, Russia.
