= Propebela golikovi =

Scientific classification
- Kingdom: Animalia
- Phylum: Mollusca
- Class: Gastropoda
- Subclass: Caenogastropoda
- Order: Neogastropoda
- Superfamily: Conoidea
- Family: Mangeliidae
- Genus: Propebela
- Species: P. golikovi

Binomial name
- Propebela golikovi (Bogdanov, 1985)

Synonyms
- Canetoma golikovi (Bogdanov, 1985); Oenopota golikovi Bogdanov, 1985

Species of gastropod

Propebela golikovi is a species of sea snail, a small marine gastropod mollusk in the family Mangeliidae. It was first described by Bogdanov in 1985 under the name Oenopota golikovi and has since been reclassified into the genus Propebela.

== Description ==
The length of the shell can reach approximately 7 mm.

== Distribution ==
This marine species occurs off Sakhalin, Eastern Russia.
