= Propebela tayensis =

Scientific classification
- Kingdom: Animalia
- Phylum: Mollusca
- Class: Gastropoda
- Subclass: Caenogastropoda
- Order: Neogastropoda
- Superfamily: Conoidea
- Family: Mangeliidae
- Genus: Propebela
- Species: P. tayensis

Binomial name
- Propebela tayensis (Nomura, S. & K.N. Hatai, 1938)

Synonyms
- Canetoma tayensis (Nomura, S. & K.N. Hatai, 1938); Oenopota tayensis (Nomura, S. & K.N. Hatai, 1938)

Species of gastropod

Propebela tayensis is a species of sea snail, a marine gastropod mollusk in the family Mangeliidae.

== Distribution ==
This species occurs in the Japan Sea at a depth of 150 m; fossil records were also found.
