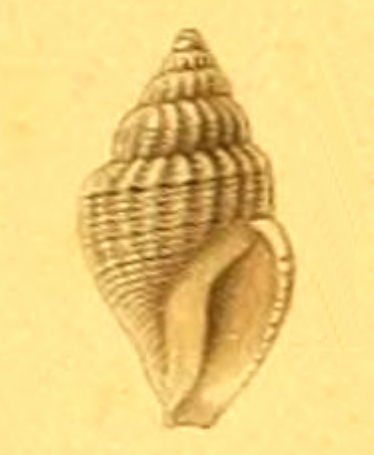
- Shell of Curtitoma finmarchia (holotype)

Scientific classification
- Kingdom: Animalia
- Phylum: Mollusca
- Class: Gastropoda
- Subclass: Caenogastropoda
- Order: Neogastropoda
- Superfamily: Conoidea
- Family: Mangeliidae
- Genus: Curtitoma
- Species: C. finmarchia

Binomial name
- Curtitoma finmarchia (Friele, 1886)

Synonyms
- Bela decussata var. finmarchia Friele, 1886 (basionym); Oenopota viridula (Møller, 1842) (misidentification); Propebela viridula sensu (Møller, 1842) (misidentification)

= Curtitoma finmarchia =

Species of gastropod

Curtitoma finmarchia is a species of sea snail, a marine gastropod mollusk in the family Mangeliidae.

== Description ==
(Original description) This species differs from Curtitoma decussata (Couthouy, 1839). The shell is short and ovo-fusiform (or ovoid-spindle-shaped); the whorls are faintly angulated; the strongly prominent axial ribs are not much curved.

== Distribution ==
This marine species occurs in the Northwest Atlantic Ocean (esp. off Norway).
