= Plicisyrinx vitjazi =

Scientific classification
- Kingdom: Animalia
- Phylum: Mollusca
- Class: Gastropoda
- Subclass: Caenogastropoda
- Order: Neogastropoda
- Superfamily: Conoidea
- Family: Pseudomelatomidae
- Genus: Plicisyrinx
- Species: P. vitjazi

Binomial name
- Plicisyrinx vitjazi Sysoev & Kantor, 1986

Species of gastropod

Plicisyrinx vitjazi is a species of sea snail, a marine gastropod mollusk in the family Pseudomelatomidae, the turrids and allies.

== Distribution ==
This marine species was found in the Kurile-Kamchatka Trench, Northern Pacific Ocean.
