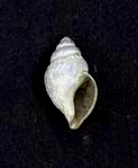
- Shell of Propebela arctica (museum specimen at Naturalis Biodiversity Center)

Scientific classification
- Kingdom: Animalia
- Phylum: Mollusca
- Class: Gastropoda
- Subclass: Caenogastropoda
- Order: Neogastropoda
- Superfamily: Conoidea
- Family: Mangeliidae
- Genus: Propebela
- Species: P. arctica

Binomial name
- Propebela arctica (Adams, 1855)

Synonyms
- Bela arctica A. Adams, 1855 (original combination); Canetoma viridula (Møller, H.P.C., 1842); Oenopota arctica (Adams, 1855); Oenopota viridula (Møller, 1842); Propebela viridula sensu (Møller, 1842)

= Propebela arctica =

Species of gastropod

Propebela arctica is a species of sea snail, a marine gastropod mollusk in the family Mangeliidae.

== Description ==
The length of the whitish, ovate-fusiform shell varies between 7.5 mm and 13 mm. The aperture and the spire have about the same length. The shell contains five whorls. These are longitudinally eroded with angulated and nodulose plicae and transversely by obscure grooves. The body whorl is swollen. The aperture is ovate. The thin, outer lip is expanded. The siphonal canal is short.

== Distribution ==
This species occurs in the Barents Sea, the Sea of Japan and in the Bering Strait.
