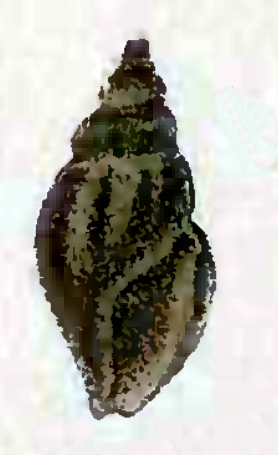
- Image of a shell of Curtitoma livida

Scientific classification
- Kingdom: Animalia
- Phylum: Mollusca
- Class: Gastropoda
- Subclass: Caenogastropoda
- Order: Neogastropoda
- Superfamily: Conoidea
- Family: Mangeliidae
- Genus: Curtitoma
- Species: C. livida

Binomial name
- Curtitoma livida (Møller, 1842)

Synonyms
- Bela livida (Møller, 1842); Defrancia livida Møller, 1842 (original combination)

= Curtitoma livida =

Species of gastropod

Curtitoma livida is a species of sea snail, a marine gastropod mollusk in the family Mangeliidae.

== Distribution ==
This marine species occurs off Greenland and in Russian waters.
