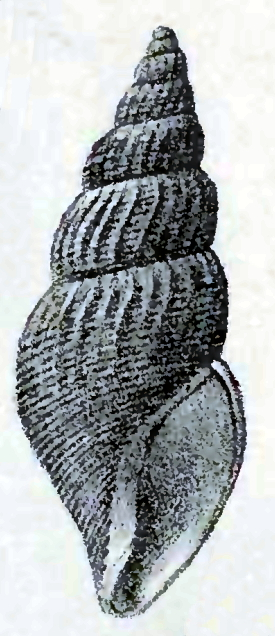
- Drawing of a shell of Curtitoma conoidea

Scientific classification
- Kingdom: Animalia
- Phylum: Mollusca
- Class: Gastropoda
- Subclass: Caenogastropoda
- Order: Neogastropoda
- Superfamily: Conoidea
- Family: Mangeliidae
- Genus: Curtitoma
- Species: C. conoidea

Binomial name
- Curtitoma conoidea (Sars G.O., 1878)

Synonyms
- Bela conoidea Sars G. O., 1878; Oenopota conoidea (Sars G.O., 1878); Pleurotoma conoidea Herzenstein, 1885

= Curtitoma conoidea =

Species of gastropod

Curtitoma conoidea is a species of sea snail, a marine gastropod mollusk in the family Mangeliidae.

== Description ==
The length of the shell varies between 8.5 mm and 15 mm.

The white shell is narrow and with a long spire. It contains 7 whorls, convex, without carina. The plications are slight, somewhat sigmoid, almost obsolete on the body whorl: everywhere covered with moderately strong revolving striae.

== Distribution ==
This species occurs in European waters off arctic Norway and Russia; on the continental shelf of the Alaska, Beaufort Sea.
