= Curtitoma delicata =

Scientific classification
- Kingdom: Animalia
- Phylum: Mollusca
- Class: Gastropoda
- Subclass: Caenogastropoda
- Order: Neogastropoda
- Superfamily: Conoidea
- Family: Mangeliidae
- Genus: Curtitoma
- Species: C. delicata

Binomial name
- Curtitoma delicata (Okutani, 1964)

Synonyms
- Funitoma delicata Okutani, 1964 (original combination); Propebela delicata (Okutani, 1964)

Species of gastropod

Curtitoma delicata is a species of sea snail, a marine gastropod mollusk in the family Mangeliidae.

== Distribution ==
This marine species occurs off Japan.
