= Splendrillia bartschi =

Scientific classification
- Kingdom: Animalia
- Phylum: Mollusca
- Class: Gastropoda
- Subclass: Caenogastropoda
- Order: Neogastropoda
- Superfamily: Conoidea
- Family: Drilliidae
- Genus: Splendrillia
- Species: S. bartschi

Binomial name
- Splendrillia bartschi (Haas, 1941)

Synonyms
- Cymatosyrinx bartschi Haas, 1941 (original combination)

Species of gastropod

Splendrillia bartschi is a species of sea snail, a marine gastropod mollusk in the family Drilliidae.

== Description ==
The shell grows to a length of 11 mm.

== Distribution ==
This species occurs in the Atlantic Ocean off Bermuda.
