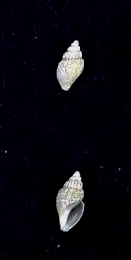
- Curtitoma trevelliana shell (Museum specimens at Naturalis Biodiversity Center)

Scientific classification
- Kingdom: Animalia
- Phylum: Mollusca
- Class: Gastropoda
- Subclass: Caenogastropoda
- Order: Neogastropoda
- Superfamily: Conoidea
- Family: Mangeliidae
- Genus: Curtitoma
- Species: C. trevelliana

Binomial name
- Curtitoma trevelliana (Turton, 1834)

Synonyms
- Bela metschigmensis Krause, 1885 (original combination); Bela trevelliana (Turton, 1834); Curtitoma reticulata (Brown, 1827) (dubious synonym, not in usage); Curtitoma trevellianum (Turton W., 1834) (misspelling); Lora metschigmensis (Krause, 1886); Lora trevyliana; Oenopota metschigmensis (Krause, 1885); Oenopota reticulata (T. Brown, 1827); Oenopota trevelliana (Turton, 1834); Pleurotoma reticulata T. Brown, 1827 (original combination); Pleurotoma trevelliana Turton, 1834; Pleurotoma trevellianum Turton W., 1834 (original combination); Pleurotoma trevelyana Jeffreys, 1867 (unjustified emendation of trevelliana Turton, 1834); Propebela reticulata (T. Brown, 1827)

= Curtitoma trevelliana =

Species of gastropod

Curtitoma trevelliana is a species of sea snail, a marine gastropod mollusk in the family Mangeliidae.

== Description ==
The length of the shell varies between 6 mm and 12 mm.

The whitish shell is somewhat thin, ovately fusiform and subventricose. It contains six whorls, slightly planate above the carina. The aperture is nearly equally contracted above and below. The outer lip is a little insinuate below the shoulder. The surface is lightly decussated by inconspicuous longitudinal plications, evanescent below the middle of the body whorl, and close, fine revolving striae.

== Distribution ==
This marine species occurs in the Bering Strait (Metchigme Bay), the Barents Sea, the Beaufort Sea, off Eastern Canada to Maine, United States, the North Atlantic Ocean (from Norway and Sweden to the British Isles), from the Arctic Ocean to California; in the Sea of Japan.
