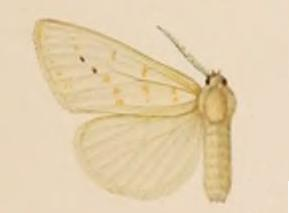

Scientific classification
- Domain: Eukaryota
- Kingdom: Animalia
- Phylum: Arthropoda
- Class: Insecta
- Order: Lepidoptera
- Superfamily: Noctuoidea
- Family: Erebidae
- Subfamily: Arctiinae
- Genus: Procanthia
- Species: P. nivea

Binomial name
- Procanthia nivea Rothschild, 1910

= Procanthia nivea =

Species of moth

Procanthia nivea is a moth of the subfamily Arctiinae first described by Walter Rothschild in 1910. It is found in South Africa.
