= Curtitoma hinae =

Scientific classification
- Kingdom: Animalia
- Phylum: Mollusca
- Class: Gastropoda
- Subclass: Caenogastropoda
- Order: Neogastropoda
- Superfamily: Conoidea
- Family: Mangeliidae
- Genus: Curtitoma
- Species: C. hinae

Binomial name
- Curtitoma hinae (Okutani, 1968)

Synonyms
- Propebela hinae Okutani, 1968 (original combination)

Species of gastropod

Curtitoma hinae is a species of sea snail, a marine gastropod mollusk in the family Mangeliidae.

== Description ==
The length of the shell varies between 3 mm and 5 mm.

== Distribution ==
This marine species occurs off Japan.
