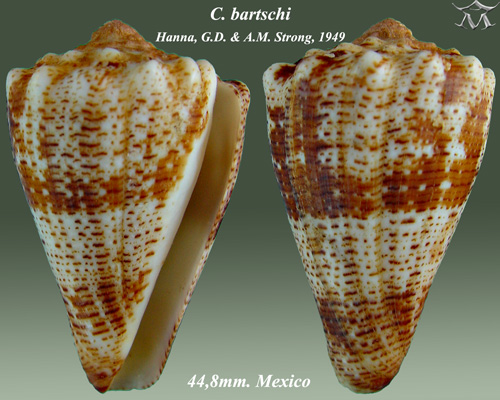
- Apertural and abapertural views of shell of Conus bartschi Hanna, G.D. & A.M. Strong, 1949
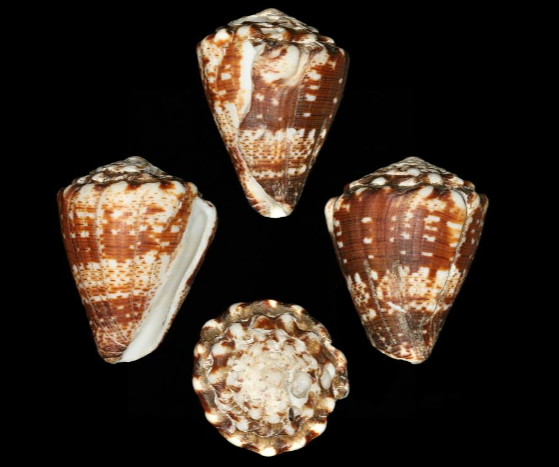

Conservation status
- Least Concern (IUCN 3.1)

Scientific classification
- Kingdom: Animalia
- Phylum: Mollusca
- Class: Gastropoda
- Subclass: Caenogastropoda
- Order: Neogastropoda
- Superfamily: Conoidea
- Family: Conidae
- Genus: Conus
- Species: C. bartschi

Binomial name
- Conus bartschi G. D. Hanna & Strong, 1949

Synonyms
- Conus (Stephanoconus) bartschi Hanna & Strong, 1949 accepted, alternate representation; Conus andrangae Schwengel, 1955; Stephanoconus andrangae Schwengel, J.S., 1955; Stephanoconus bartschi (Hanna & Strong, 1949)

= Conus bartschi =

Species of sea snail

Conus bartschi, common name Bartsch's cone, is a species of sea snail, a marine gastropod mollusk in the family Conidae, the cone snails and their allies.

Like all species within the genus Conus, these snails are predatory and venomous. They are capable of stinging humans, therefore live ones should be handled carefully or not at all.

== Description ==
The size of the shell varies between 22 mm and 50 mm.

== Distribution ==
This marine species occurs in the Gulf of California, Western Mexico, to Costa Rica.
