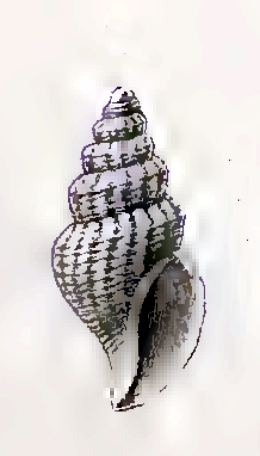
- Shell of Propebela cancellata

Scientific classification
- Kingdom: Animalia
- Phylum: Mollusca
- Class: Gastropoda
- Subclass: Caenogastropoda
- Order: Neogastropoda
- Superfamily: Conoidea
- Family: Mangeliidae
- Genus: Propebela
- Species: P. cancellata

Binomial name
- Propebela cancellata (Mighels & C. B. Adams, 1842)

Synonyms
- Bela cancellata (Mighels & Adams, 1842); Bela cancellata canadensis (Mighels & Adams, 1842); Fusus cancellatus Mighels & Adams, 1842 (original combination); Lora cancellata (Mighels & Adams, 1842); Oenopota cancellata (Mighels & Adams, 1842)

= Propebela cancellata =

Species of gastropod

Propebela cancellata is a species of sea snail, a marine gastropod mollusk in the family Mangeliidae.

== Description ==
The shell has its axial ribs curved sigmoidally. The part between the suture and the ridge is devoid of spiral sculpture. The teeth of the radula are ensiform.

The shell contains nine whorls, somewhat convex, narrowly obtusely shoulders. The ribs are strong, flexuous, with a sigmoid curve at the shoulder. They are crossed by coarse spiral cinguli. The color of the shell is white, stained rosy or light chestnut, or yellowish.

== Distribution ==
This species occurs in the Northwest Atlantic Ocean and the Gulf of Maine.
