= Curtitoma bartschi =

Scientific classification
- Kingdom: Animalia
- Phylum: Mollusca
- Class: Gastropoda
- Subclass: Caenogastropoda
- Order: Neogastropoda
- Superfamily: Conoidea
- Family: Mangeliidae
- Genus: Curtitoma
- Species: C. bartschi

Binomial name
- Curtitoma bartschi (I.P. Bogdanov, 1985)

Synonyms
- Oenopota bartschi Bogdanov, 1985

Species of gastropod

Curtitoma bartschi is a species of sea snail, a marine gastropod mollusk in the family Mangeliidae.

== Description ==
The length of the shell varies between 5 mm and 10 mm.

Attributes of the Curtitoma bartschi include, a benthos functional group, and a predator feeding type.

== Distribution ==
This marine species occurs off Japan and Urup Island, in eastern Russia.
