= Plicisyrinx plicata =

Scientific classification
- Kingdom: Animalia
- Phylum: Mollusca
- Class: Gastropoda
- Subclass: Caenogastropoda
- Order: Neogastropoda
- Superfamily: Conoidea
- Family: Pseudomelatomidae
- Genus: Plicisyrinx
- Species: P. plicata

Binomial name
- Plicisyrinx plicata (Okutani, 1964)

Synonyms
- Propebela plicata Okutani, 1964

Species of gastropod

Plicisyrinx plicata is a species of sea snail, a marine gastropod mollusk in the family Pseudomelatomidae, the turrids and allies.

== Distribution ==
This marine species occurs off Japan.
