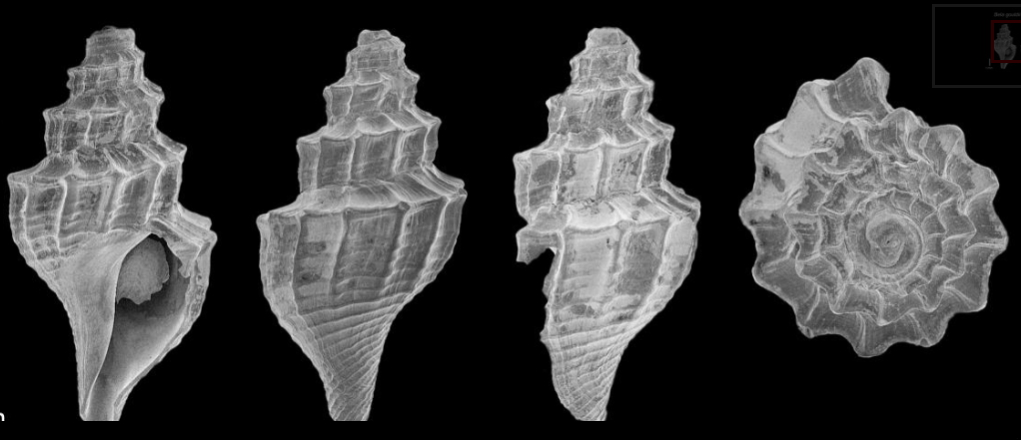
- Shells of Propebela rugulata (holotype of the synonym Bela gouldii at the Smithsonian Institution)

Scientific classification
- Kingdom: Animalia
- Phylum: Mollusca
- Class: Gastropoda
- Subclass: Caenogastropoda
- Order: Neogastropoda
- Superfamily: Conoidea
- Family: Mangeliidae
- Genus: Propebela
- Species: P. rugulata

Binomial name
- Propebela rugulata (Møller in Reeve, 1846)

Synonyms
- Bela gouldii Verrill, 1882; Bela rugulata (Reeve, 1846); Bela rugulata var. clathrata Friele, 1886; Bela subarctica Derjugin, 1924; Oenopota rugulata (Reeve, 1846); Oenopota rugulatus [sic] (incorrect gender ending); Pleurotoma rugulatus Reeve, 1846 (original combination); Pleurotoma ulidiana Thompson W., 1845; Propebela gouldii A. E. Verrill, 1882

= Propebela rugulata =

Species of gastropod

Propebela rugulata (common name : Gould's northern turrid) is a species of sea snail, a marine gastropod mollusc in the family Mangeliidae.

== Description ==
The whorls are angulated; the axial ribs straight, and not sigmoid. The length of the aperture is about the same as that of the spire. The angulated part of the ultimate whorl is sharp. The apex has a somewhat flattened protoconch. The first whorl has two prominent spiral ribs. The teeth of the radula vary, from broad-coniform to elongate-coniform

== Distribution ==
This marine species occurs from Greenland to Massachusetts, United States. Fossils have been found in Quaternary strata of Iceland, age range: 2.588 to 0.012 Ma
