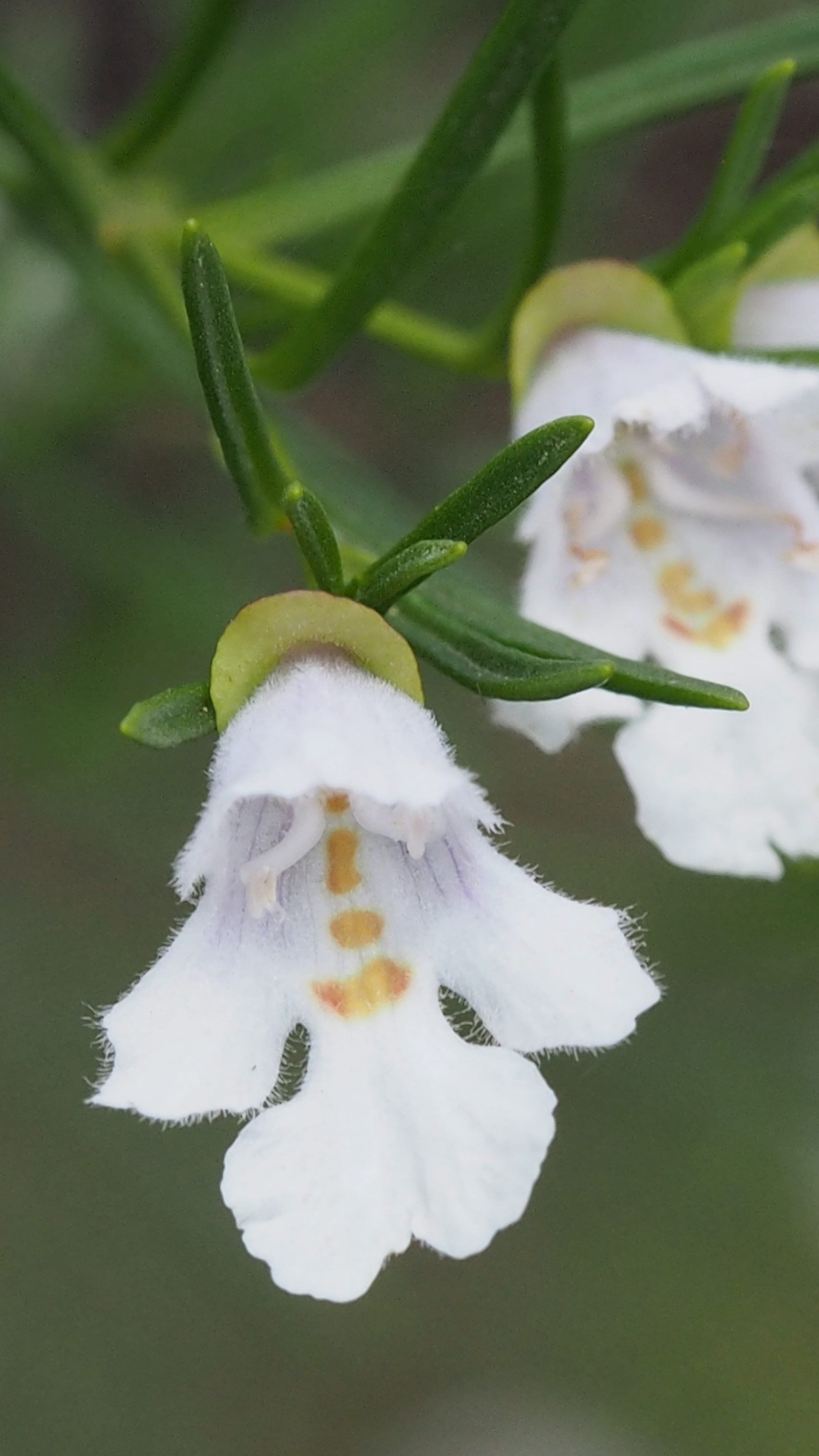
- Prostanthera nivea var. nivea in Girraween National Park

Scientific classification
- Kingdom: Plantae
- Clade: Tracheophytes
- Clade: Angiosperms
- Clade: Eudicots
- Clade: Asterids
- Order: Lamiales
- Family: Lamiaceae
- Genus: Prostanthera
- Species: P. nivea

Binomial name
- Prostanthera nivea A.Cunn. ex Benth.
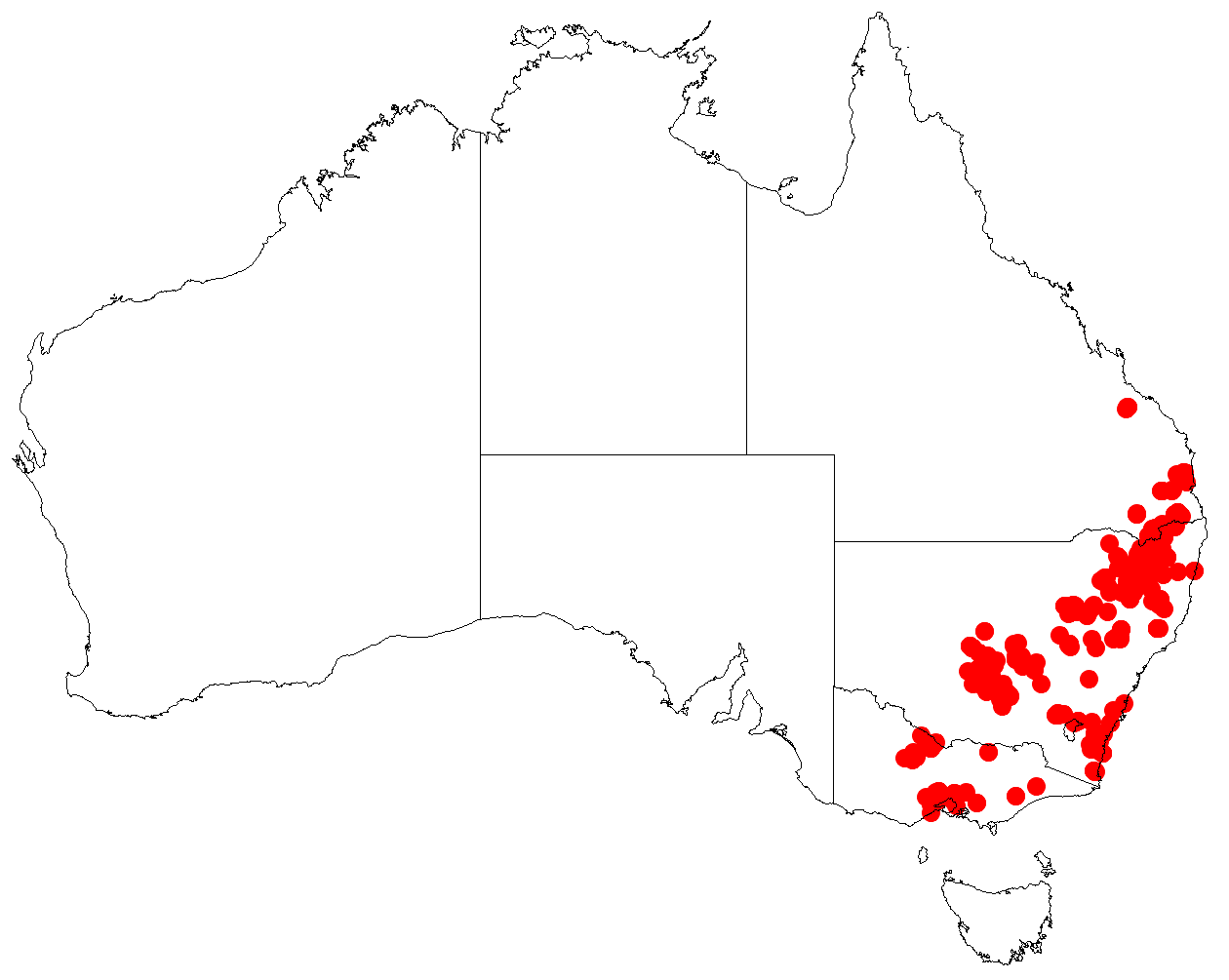
- Occurrence data from AVH

= Prostanthera nivea =

Snowy mint-bush

Species of flowering plant

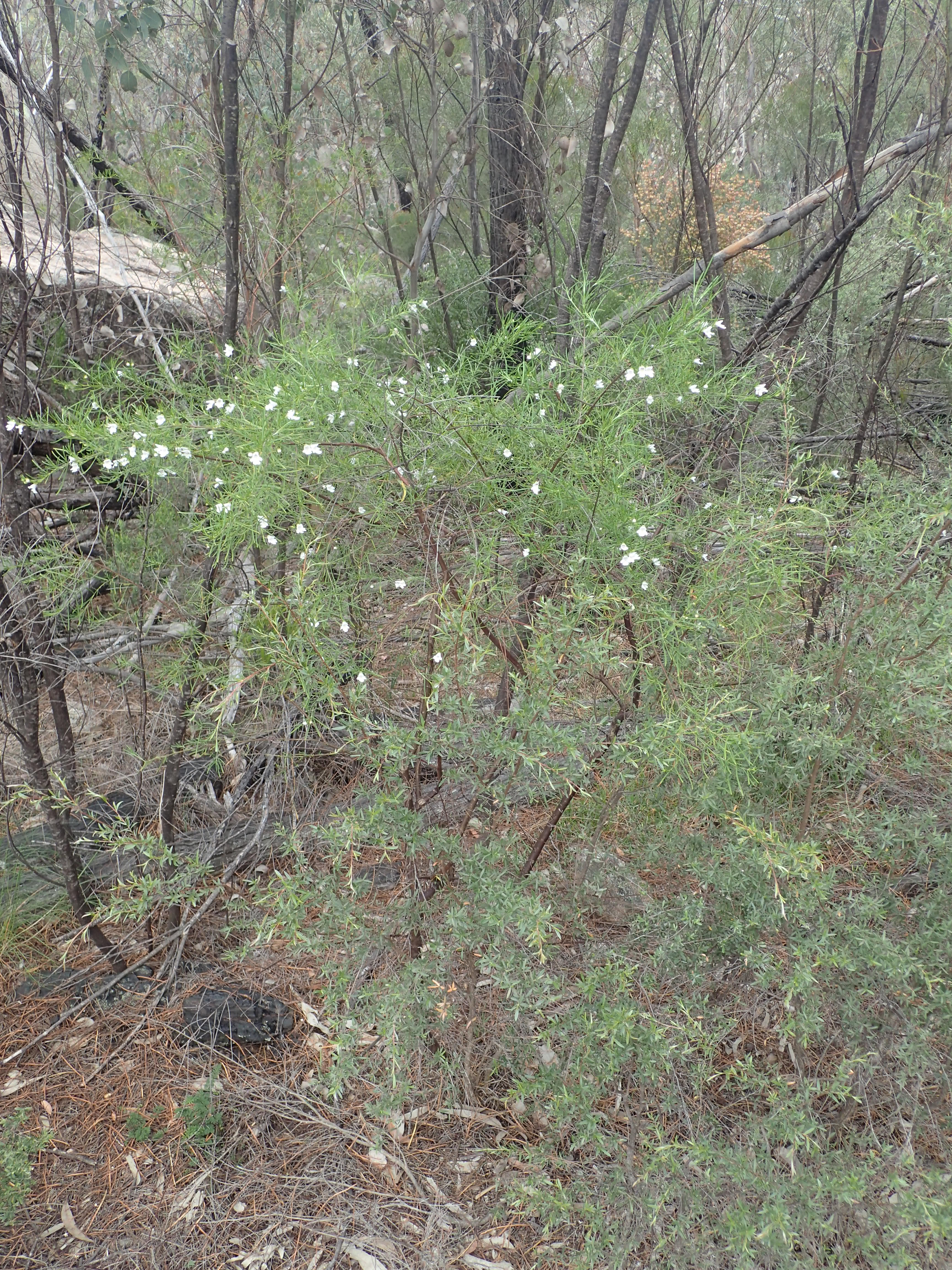
Habit

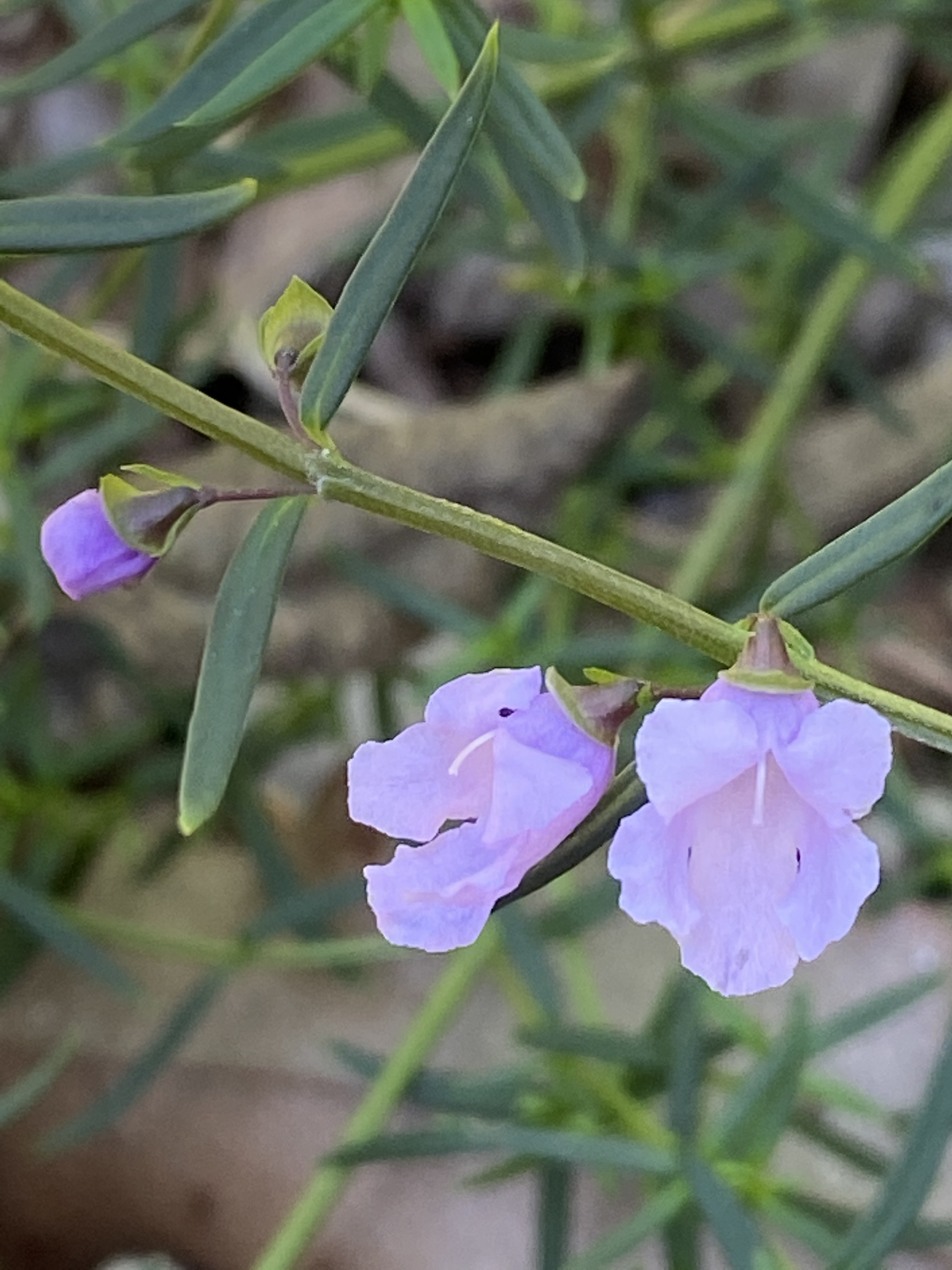
Prostanthera nivea var. induta

Prostanthera nivea, commonly known as snowy mint-bush, is a species of flowering plant in the family Lamiaceae and is endemic to eastern Australia. It is a shrub with linear to cylindrical leaves and white flowers arranged in leaf axils near the ends of branchlets and is one of the mint-bushes that is not aromatic.

== Description ==
Prostanthera nivea is an erect or spreading shrub that grows to a height of 1–4 m (3 ft 3 in – 13 ft 1 in) with four-ridged branches but is not aromatic. The leaves are linear to more or less cylindrical, 10–50 mm (0.39–1.97 in) long and 0.5–2 mm (0.020–0.079 in) wide and sessile. The flowers are arranged in leaf axils near the ends of branches with bracteoles that are inconspicuous or up to 4 mm (0.16 in) long at the base. The sepals are 6–8 mm (0.24–0.31 in) long forming a tube 3–4 mm (0.12–0.16 in) long with two lobes, the upper lobe 3–5 mm (0.12–0.20 in) long. The petals are white to mauve, 14–18 mm (0.55–0.71 in) long with yellow spots inside the tube. Flowering occurs from September to December.

== Taxonomy ==
Prostanthera nivea was first formally described in 1834 by George Bentham from an unpublished description by Alan Cunningham. Bentham's description was published in his book Labiatarum Genera et Species.

Bentham described two varieties and the names are accepted by the Australian Plant Census:

- Prostanthera nivea var. induta Benth., an erect, often dense shrub 1–2 m (3 ft 3 in – 6 ft 7 in) high with branches densely covered with white hairs, leaves mostly 1–2 mm (0.039–0.079 in) wide and leafy, linear bracteoles 2–4 mm (0.079–0.157 in) long;
- Prostanthera nivea A.Cunn. ex Benth. var. nivea, an erect, often thin shrub 1–4 m (3 ft 3 in – 13 ft 1 in) high with branches that are glabrous or only sparsely covered with white hairs, leaves mostly 0.5–1 mm (0.020–0.039 in) wide and inconspicuous bracteoles.

== Distribution and habitat ==
Snowy mint-bush grows in forest, woodland and heath in south-eastern Queensland, eastern New South Wales and Victoria. Subspecies induta grows in rocky crevices or on ledges in the Warrumbungles with a single collection from the Pilliga forest.
