= Ithycythara muricoides =

Scientific classification
- Kingdom: Animalia
- Phylum: Mollusca
- Class: Gastropoda
- Subclass: Caenogastropoda
- Order: Neogastropoda
- Superfamily: Conoidea
- Family: Mangeliidae
- Genus: Ithycythara
- Species: I. muricoides

Binomial name
- Ithycythara muricoides (C. B. Adams, 1850)

Synonyms
- Mangelia muricoides Adams C. B., 1850

Species of gastropod

Ithycythara muricoides is a species of sea snail, a marine gastropod mollusk in the family Mangeliidae.

This species has become a synonym of Ithycythara lanceolata (C. B. Adams, 1850)

== Description ==
The length of the shell attains 10 mm.

(Original description) The pure white shell is fusiform and slender.. The longitudinal sculpture shows six narrow subacute prominent ribs on each whorl, which are sinuated posteriorly on the right side, and which are continuous along the spire like a species in the genus Murex.The spiral sculpture consists of very numerous microscopic spiral striae in the intercostal spaces. The apex is acute. The outlines of the spire are nearly rectilinear. The shell contains six slightly convex whorls, with a lightly impressed suture. The body whorl is gradually attenuated below into a wide siphonal canal.

== Distribution ==
This marine species occurs off Jamaica, Honduras and Barbados.
