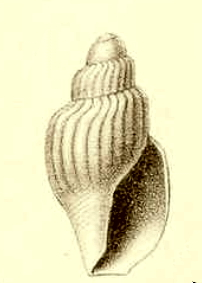
- Original image of a shell of Lorabela plicatula

Scientific classification
- Kingdom: Animalia
- Phylum: Mollusca
- Class: Gastropoda
- Subclass: Caenogastropoda
- Order: Neogastropoda
- Superfamily: Conoidea
- Family: Mangeliidae
- Genus: Lorabela
- Species: L. plicatula

Binomial name
- Lorabela plicatula (Thiele, 1912)

Synonyms
- Bela plicatula Thiele, 1912 (original combination); Oenopota plicatula (Thiele, 1912)

= Lorabela plicatula =

Species of gastropod

Lorabela plicatula is a species of sea snail, a marine gastropod mollusk in the family Mangeliidae.

== Description ==
The length of the shell varies between 6 mm and 12 mm.

(Original description in German) The shell attains a somewhat more significant size than Belalora striatula (Thiele, 1912). They are less angular and only quite indistinctly spirally grooved. The described shell is 5.7 mm high and 3 mm wide, and consists of 3 3/4 whorls, of which the first 1 1/2 are smooth and rounded, while the following whorls show a rounded shoulder edge and distinct, curved longitudinal folds. The body whorl is weakly arched (or slightly convex), and is faintly offset below towards the siphonal canal; the spiral grooves, even if only shallow, are nevertheless clearly discernible on the underside and at the beginning of the siphonal canal.

== Distribution ==
This species occurs in the Ross Sea and Weddell Sea, Antarctica
