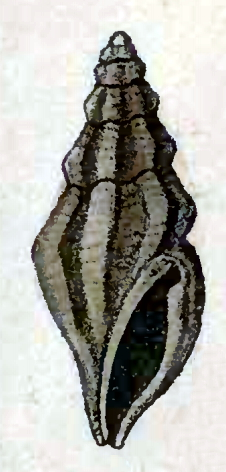
- Drawing of a shell of Ithycythara rubricata

Scientific classification
- Kingdom: Animalia
- Phylum: Mollusca
- Class: Gastropoda
- Subclass: Caenogastropoda
- Order: Neogastropoda
- Superfamily: Conoidea
- Family: Mangeliidae
- Genus: Ithycythara
- Species: I. rubricata

Binomial name
- Ithycythara rubricata (Reeve, 1846)

= Ithycythara rubricata =

Species of gastropod

Ithycythara rubricata, common name reddish mangelia, is a species of sea snail, a marine gastropod mollusc in the family Mangeliidae.

This species may be an older name for Ithycythara auberiana

== Description ==
The length of the shell attains 6 mm. The shell is very distantly ribbed, closely transversely striate. Its color is yellowish white to chestnut.

== Distribution ==
This marine species occurs off Florida and the West Indies.
