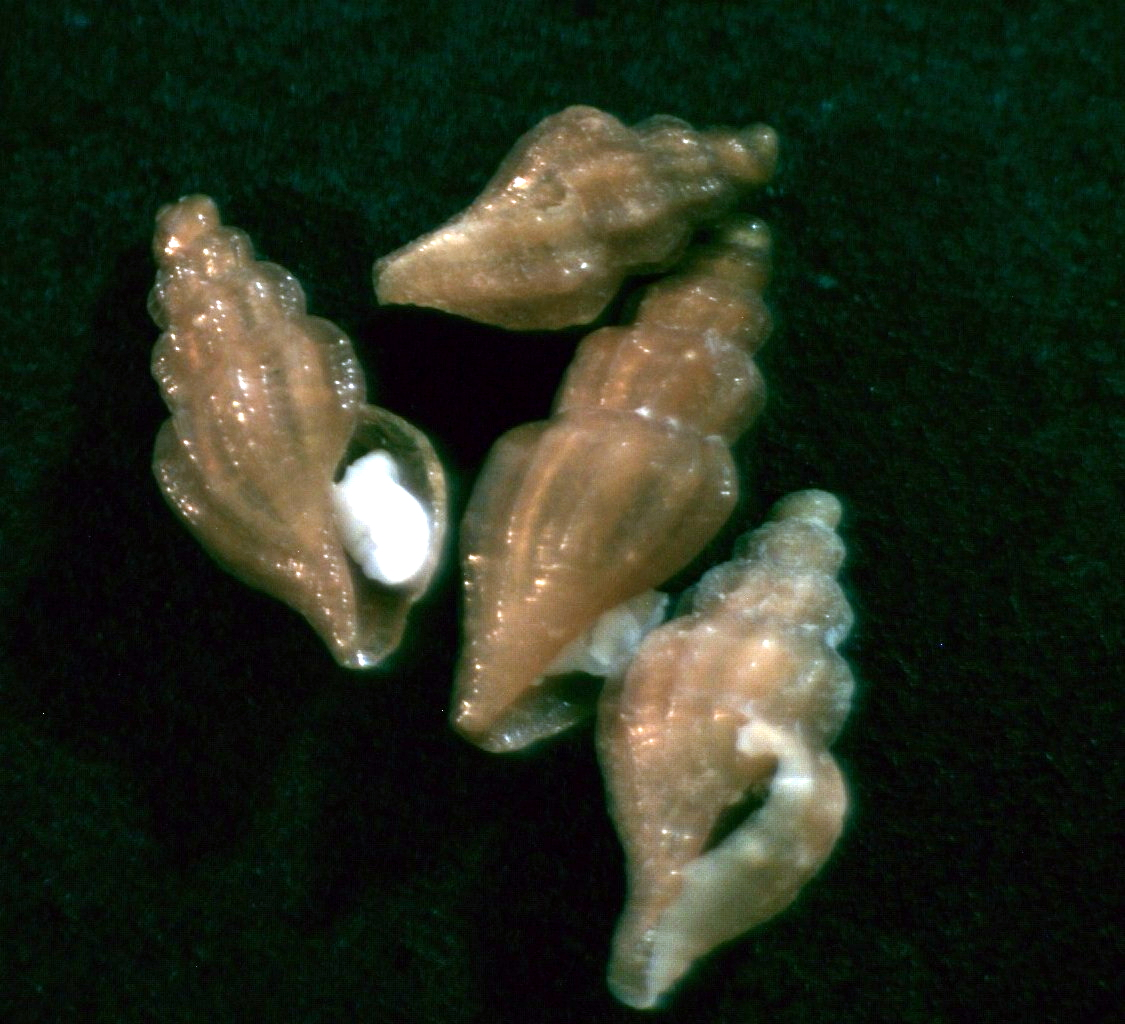
- Shells of Stellatoma stellata

Scientific classification
- Kingdom: Animalia
- Phylum: Mollusca
- Class: Gastropoda
- Subclass: Caenogastropoda
- Order: Neogastropoda
- Superfamily: Conoidea
- Family: Mangeliidae
- Genus: Stellatoma
- Species: S. stellata

Binomial name
- Stellatoma stellata (Stearns, 1872)

Synonyms
- Mangelia stellata Stearns, 1872 (original combination)

= Stellatoma stellata =

Species of gastropod

Stellatoma stellata is a species of sea snail, a marine gastropod mollusk in the family Mangeliidae.

== Description ==
The adult shell grows to a length of 8.9 mm, its diameter 3.5 mm.

The turreted shell is yellowish, tinged more or less with reddish brown. It contains seven whorls, angulated above and with a distinct suture. They show 12 or 13 strong, smooth longitudinal ribs, extending to the extremity of the basal volution, which also shows near its termination a few revolving lines. The outer lip is effuse, externally much thickened, deeply notched near the suture. The lip and columella in most specimens are dark ferruginous brown. G.W. Tryon adds to the above description that the interspaces of the ribs, in one of his specimens, are covered with fine revolving striae, and that another has a faint central band.

== Distribution ==
This marine species occurs off Tampa Bay, Florida, USA.
