= Granotoma dissoluta =

Scientific classification
- Kingdom: Animalia
- Phylum: Mollusca
- Class: Gastropoda
- Subclass: Caenogastropoda
- Order: Neogastropoda
- Superfamily: Conoidea
- Family: Mangeliidae
- Genus: Granotoma
- Species: G. dissoluta

Binomial name
- Granotoma dissoluta (Yokoyama, 1926)

Synonyms
- Bela dissoluta Yokoyama, 1926; Lora dissoluta (Yokoyama, 1926); Oenopota dissoluta (M. Yokoyama, 1926)

Species of gastropod

Granotoma dissoluta is a species of sea snail, a marine gastropod mollusk in the family Mangeliidae.

== Distribution ==
This species occurs in the Sea of Japan.
