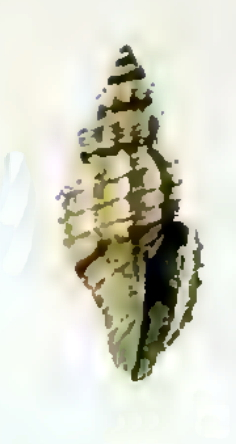
- Original image of a shell of Stellatoma mellissi

Scientific classification
- Kingdom: Animalia
- Phylum: Mollusca
- Class: Gastropoda
- Subclass: Caenogastropoda
- Order: Neogastropoda
- Superfamily: Conoidea
- Family: Mangeliidae
- Genus: Stellatoma
- Species: S. mellissi

Binomial name
- Stellatoma mellissi (E. A. Smith, 1890)

Synonyms
- Pleurotoma (Mangilia) mellissi E. A. Smith, 1890 (basionym)

= Stellatoma mellissi =

Species of gastropod

Stellatoma mellissi is a species of sea snail, a marine gastropod mollusk in the family Mangeliidae.

== Description ==
The adult shell grows to a length of 5 mm, its diameter 2 mm. The small shell is fusiform-ovate. It has a reddish color and a darker reddish color at the sutures. The body whorl has a red band in the middle. The shell contains 6½ whorls. The 2½ protoconch whorls are convex and smooth. The third whorl is convex and is slightly obliquely lirate. The others have a broad sloping shoulder and a greatly rounded anterior portion. They show about 14 axial ribs. The spiral sculpture consists of 3 cords in the upperwhorls and 16-20 in the body whorl. The aperture is elongate-ovate, measuring about half the total length. The outer lip is marked by transverse striations and is incrassate with a strong denticle close to the posterior sinus. The microscopic structure of this species appears under the microscope to consist of numerous spiral series of very minute grain-like scales, which, at times, are arranged one under the other, so as to produce the appearance of a longitudinal series.

== Distribution ==
This species is found in the Atlantic Ocean off St. Helena.
