= Ithycythara apicodenticulata =

Scientific classification
- Kingdom: Animalia
- Phylum: Mollusca
- Class: Gastropoda
- Subclass: Caenogastropoda
- Order: Neogastropoda
- Superfamily: Conoidea
- Family: Mangeliidae
- Genus: Ithycythara
- Species: I. apicodenticulata

Binomial name
- Ithycythara apicodenticulata Robba, Di Geronimo, Chaimanee, Negri & Sanfilippo, 2007

Species of gastropod

Ithycythara apicodenticulata is a species of sea snail, a marine gastropod mollusk in the family Mangeliidae.

== Distribution ==
This marine species occurs in the western part of the Gulf of Thailand.
