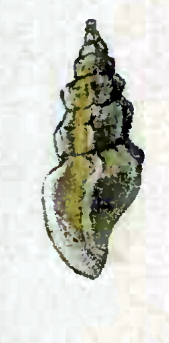
- Drawing of a shell of Hemicythara angicostata

Scientific classification
- Kingdom: Animalia
- Phylum: Mollusca
- Class: Gastropoda
- Subclass: Caenogastropoda
- Order: Neogastropoda
- Superfamily: Conoidea
- Family: Mangeliidae
- Genus: Hemicythara
- Species: H. angicostata

Binomial name
- Hemicythara angicostata (Reeve, 1846)

Synonyms
- Cithara melanostoma Garrett, A., 1873; Mangilia angicostata (Reeve, 1846); Pleurotoma angicostata Reeve, 1846 (original combination); Pleurotoma scalata Souverbie, S.M. in Souverbie, S.M. & R.P. Montrouzier, 1874

= Hemicythara angicostata =

Species of gastropod

Hemicythara angicostata is a species of sea snail, a marine gastropod mollusc in the family Mangeliidae.

== Description ==
The length of the shell attains 6 mm.

The shell is turreted. The whorls are distinctly shouldered, with a few distant small longitudinal ribs, extending to the suture, and much wider interspaces. The color of the shell is light yellowish brown to white. The columella is chocolate tinged, often with a narrow interrupted chocolate central line.

== Distribution ==
This marine species occurs off Taiwan and New Caledonia.
