= Paraspirotropis simplicissima =

Scientific classification
- Kingdom: Animalia
- Phylum: Mollusca
- Class: Gastropoda
- Subclass: Caenogastropoda
- Order: Neogastropoda
- Superfamily: Conoidea
- Family: Mangeliidae
- Genus: Paraspirotropis
- Species: P. simplicissima

Binomial name
- Paraspirotropis simplicissima (Dall, 1907)

Synonyms
- Pleurotomella simplicissima Dall, 1907

Species of gastropod

Paraspirotropis simplicissima is a species of sea snail, a marine gastropod mollusk in the family Mangeliidae.

== Description ==
The length of the shell attains 28 mm, its diameter 9 mm.

(Original description) The shell is small for the genus. It is smooth, polished, pale straw-color over a chalky substratum. The shell contains about six whorls. The protoconch is eroded, the subsequent whorls are turriculate with an angular shoulder. The suture is distinct, not appressed. The whorl in front of it to the shoulder is flat, below the shoulder moderately rounded. The incremental lines are visible but feeble. Under a lens obsolete irregular spiral lines are perceptible, but to the naked eye the shell seems smooth. The aperture is narrow. The anal sulcus is wide and shallow, beginning at the suture and extending to the shoulder, after which the outer lip is roundly arcuate forward, receding later to the siphonal canal . The aperture is milk-white, a slight glaze on the body and columella. The columella is short, straight and obliquely truncate in front. The siphonal canal is short, wide, not recurved. The outer lip is thin and sharp.

== Distribution ==
This marine species occurs in the Okhotsk Sea
