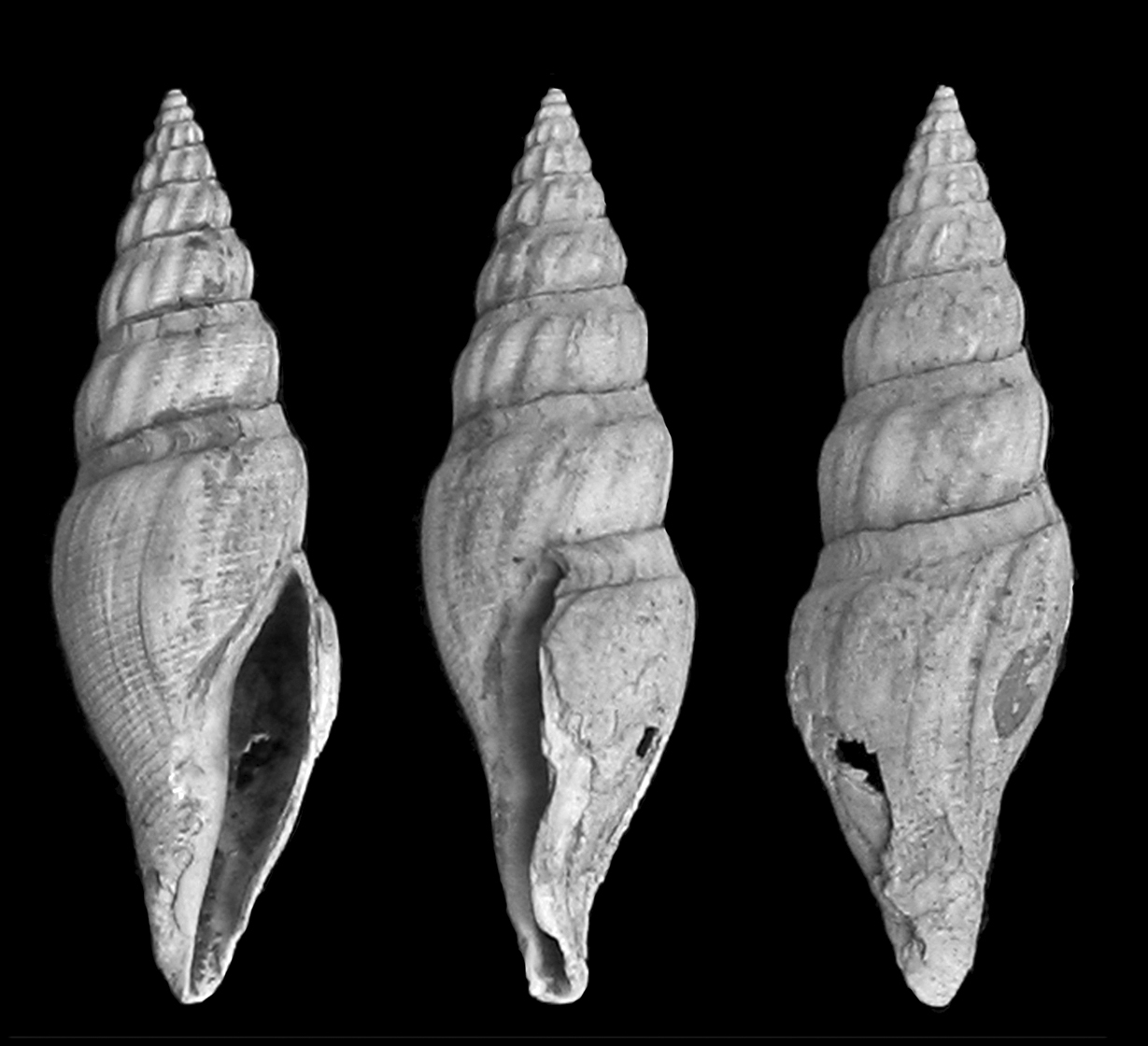
- Shells of †Belidaphne hypoglypta (holotype in MNHN, Paris)

Scientific classification
- Kingdom: Animalia
- Phylum: Mollusca
- Class: Gastropoda
- Subclass: Caenogastropoda
- Order: Neogastropoda
- Superfamily: Conoidea
- Family: Mangeliidae
- Genus: †Belidaphne
- Species: †B. hypoglypta

Binomial name
- †Belidaphne hypoglypta (Fontannes, 1880)

Synonyms
- † Drillia hypoglypta Fontannes, 1882 (original combination)

= Belidaphne hypoglypta =

Extinct species of gastropod

Belidaphne hypoglypta is an extinct species of sea snail, a marine gastropod mollusk in the family Mangeliidae.

== Distribution ==
This extinct marine species was found in France.
