= Granoturris presleyi =

Scientific classification
- Kingdom: Animalia
- Phylum: Mollusca
- Class: Gastropoda
- Subclass: Caenogastropoda
- Order: Neogastropoda
- Superfamily: Conoidea
- Family: Mangeliidae
- Genus: Granoturris
- Species: G. presleyi

Binomial name
- Granoturris presleyi Lyons, 1972

Species of gastropod

Granoturris presleyi is a species of sea snail, a marine gastropod mollusk in the family Mangeliidae. The species was first described by W.G Lyons in 1972.

== Description ==
The length of the shell attains 5 mm.

== Distribution ==
G. presleyi can be found in Caribbean waters, off the western coast of Florida.
