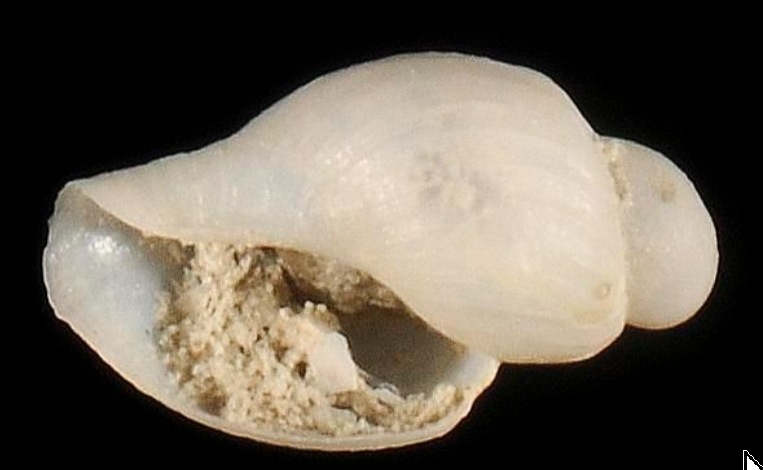
- Shell of Lorabela davisi (specimen at the Smithsonian Institution)

Scientific classification
- Kingdom: Animalia
- Phylum: Mollusca
- Class: Gastropoda
- Subclass: Caenogastropoda
- Order: Neogastropoda
- Superfamily: Conoidea
- Family: Mangeliidae
- Genus: Lorabela
- Species: L. davisi

Binomial name
- Lorabela davisi (Hedley, 1916)

Synonyms
- Oenopota davisi Hedley, 1916 (original combination)

= Lorabela davisi =

Species of gastropod

Lorabela davisi is a species of sea snail, a marine gastropod mollusk in the family Mangeliidae.

== Description ==
The length of the shell attains 7 mm, its diameter 4 mm.

(original description) The ovate shell is rather thin, with a gradate spire, and is buff in colour. It consists of four whorls, of which approximately one and a half are in the protoconch.

A deep subsutural sinus is present, and the fasciole forms a broad, flat shelf. The sculpture consists of numerous low, narrow, closely spaced radial lamellae. These lamellae are concave across the fasciole and become directed forwards on the body whorl. They are crossed by fine, closely spaced, incised spiral lines, producing a reticulated pattern that extends from the shoulder angle to the tip of the anterior canal.

The aperture is narrowly oblong. The outer lip is thin and simple, while the siphonal canal is short and broad. The inner lip is smooth and covered with a layer of callus.

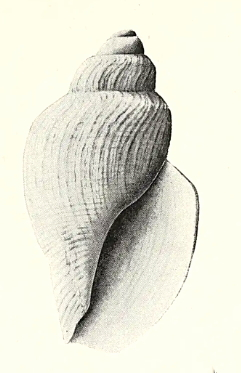
Lorabela davisi - holotype

== Distribution ==
This species occurs in the Weddell Sea, Antarctica.
