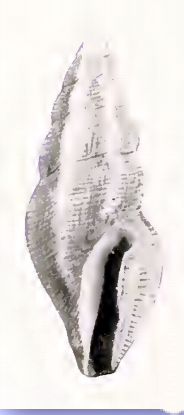
- Original image of a shell of Ithycythara penelope

Scientific classification
- Kingdom: Animalia
- Phylum: Mollusca
- Class: Gastropoda
- Subclass: Caenogastropoda
- Order: Neogastropoda
- Superfamily: Conoidea
- Family: Mangeliidae
- Genus: Ithycythara
- Species: I. penelope

Binomial name
- Ithycythara penelope (Dall, 1919)

Synonyms
- Cytharella (Agathotoma) penelope Dall, 1919

= Ithycythara penelope =

Species of gastropod

Ithycythara penelope is a species of sea snail, a marine gastropod mollusk in the family Mangeliidae.

== Description ==
The length of the shell attains 5 mm, its diameter 2 mm.

(Original description) The minute shell is pale brownish, or whitish with obscure brownish spiral bands. It has a minute trochoid protoconch of three whorls the earlier smooth, the last axially minutely closely ribbed, followed by five subsequent whorls. The suture is distinct, hardly appressed, the whorl sloping steeply away from it. The; spiral sculpture consists of fine close-set threads over the entire surface. The whorls are moderately convex. The axial sculpture consists of (on the body whorl six) prominent ribs, with much wider interspaces, extending the whole length of the whorl and on the spire more prominent at the periphery. The aperture is narrow and parallel-sided. The outer lip is varicose and smooth within. The anal sulcus is wide and shallow. The siphonal canal is hardly differentiated.

== Distribution ==
This marine species occurs in the Sea of Cortez, Western Mexico, and off the Galápagos Islands
