= Belalora weirichi =

Scientific classification
- Kingdom: Animalia
- Phylum: Mollusca
- Class: Gastropoda
- Subclass: Caenogastropoda
- Order: Neogastropoda
- Superfamily: Conoidea
- Family: Mangeliidae
- Genus: Belalora
- Species: B. weirichi

Binomial name
- Belalora weirichi Engl, 2008

Synonyms
- Oenopota weirichi Engl, 2008 (original combination)

Species of gastropod

Belalora weirichi is a species of sea snail, a marine gastropod mollusk in the family Mangeliidae.

== Distribution ==
This marine species occurs on the Abyssal plain, off Antarctica.
