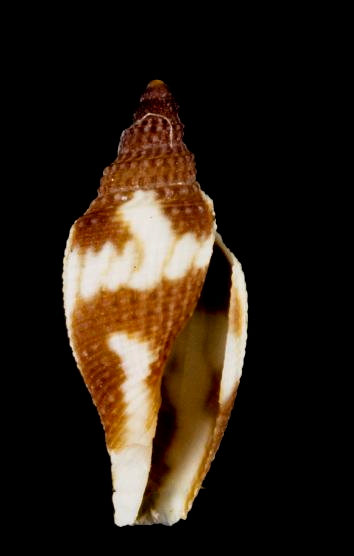
- Shell of Diaugasma olyra (specimen at MNHN, Paris)

Scientific classification
- Kingdom: Animalia
- Phylum: Mollusca
- Class: Gastropoda
- Subclass: Caenogastropoda
- Order: Neogastropoda
- Superfamily: Conoidea
- Family: Raphitomidae
- Genus: Diaugasma; Melvill, 1917

Type species
- Daphnella epicharta Melvill & Standen, 1903

Species
- See text

= Diaugasma =

Genus of gastropods

Diaugasma is a genus of sea snails, marine gastropod mollusks in the family Raphitomidae.

== Description ==
The minute shell is oliviform, smoother microscopically spirally striolate, mainly on each side of the sutures, leaving the central portion of the whorl plain, in form cylindrical or elongate, compact, only slightly impressed at the sutures. The whorls of the protoconch are closely and very finely cancellate. The whorls are semi-pellucid, unicolorous white, or flecked with pale stramineous. The aperture is narrowly oblong. The outer lip is nearly straight, slightly thickened,. The sinus is hardly expressed.

== Species ==
Species within the genus Diaugasma include:

- Diaugasma epicharta (Melvill & Standen, 1903)
- Diaugasma olyra (Reeve, 1845)

Species brought into synonymy

- Diaugasma marchadi (Knudsen, 1956): synonym of Kyllinia marchadi (Knudsen, 1956)
