= Granoturris padolina =

Scientific classification
- Kingdom: Animalia
- Phylum: Mollusca
- Class: Gastropoda
- Subclass: Caenogastropoda
- Order: Neogastropoda
- Superfamily: Conoidea
- Family: Mangeliidae
- Genus: Granoturris
- Species: G. padolina

Binomial name
- Granoturris padolina Fargo, 1953

Synonyms
- Granoturris pagolina Fargo, 1953; Granoturris (= Kurtziella) padolina Fargo, 1953

Species of gastropod

Granoturris padolina is a species of sea snail, a marine gastropod mollusk in the family Mangeliidae.

== Description ==
The length of the shell varies between 5 mm and 9 mm.

== Distribution ==
This species occurs in the Caribbean Sea off Colombia; also off Southern Brazil (Estado de Santa Catarina)

Fossils have been found in Quaternary strata of Florida, USA.
