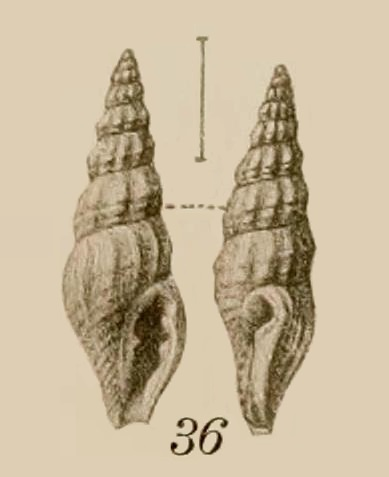
- Holotype

Scientific classification
- Kingdom: Animalia
- Phylum: Mollusca
- Class: Gastropoda
- Subclass: Caenogastropoda
- Order: Neogastropoda
- Superfamily: Conoidea
- Family: Mangeliidae
- Genus: Ithycythara
- Species: I. oyuana

Binomial name
- Ithycythara oyuana (Yokoyama, 1922)

Synonyms
- † Mangilia (Cythara) oyuana Yokoyama, 1922

= Ithycythara oyuana =

Species of gastropod

Ithycythara oyuana is a species of sea snail, a marine gastropod mollusk in the family Mangeliidae.

== Description ==
The length of the shell attains 7 mm.

== Distribution ==
This marine species occurs off Korea and Japan.
