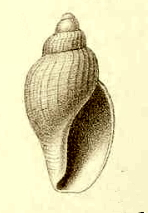
- Original image of a shell of Lorabela glacialis

Scientific classification
- Kingdom: Animalia
- Phylum: Mollusca
- Class: Gastropoda
- Subclass: Caenogastropoda
- Order: Neogastropoda
- Superfamily: Conoidea
- Family: Mangeliidae
- Genus: Lorabela
- Species: L. glacialis

Binomial name
- Lorabela glacialis (Thiele, 1912)

Synonyms
- Bela glacialis Thiele, 1912 (original combination); Oenopota glacialis (Thiele, 1912)

= Lorabela glacialis =

Species of gastropod

Lorabela glacialis is a species of sea snail, a marine gastropod mollusk in the family Mangeliidae.

== Distribution ==
This species occurs in the Ross Sea, Antarctica
