= Petrafixia annemariae =

Scientific classification
- Kingdom: Animalia
- Phylum: Mollusca
- Class: Gastropoda
- Subclass: Caenogastropoda
- Order: Neogastropoda
- Superfamily: Conoidea
- Family: Mangeliidae
- Genus: †Petrafixia
- Species: †P. annemariae

Binomial name
- †Petrafixia annemariae (Lozouet, 2015)

Synonyms
- † Bela annemariae Lozouet, 2015

Extinct species of gastropod

Petrafixia annemariae is an extinct species of sea snail, a marine gastropod mollusk in the family Mangeliidae.

== Distribution ==
This extinct marine species was found in Aquitaine, France
