= Euryentmema cigclis =

Scientific classification
- Kingdom: Animalia
- Phylum: Mollusca
- Class: Gastropoda
- Subclass: Caenogastropoda
- Order: Neogastropoda
- Superfamily: Conoidea
- Family: Mangeliidae
- Genus: Euryentmema
- Species: E. cigclis

Binomial name
- Euryentmema cigclis W.P. Woodring, 1928

Extinct species of gastropod

Euryentmema cigclis is an extinct species of sea snails, a marine gastropod mollusc in the family Mangeliidae.

== Description ==
The length of the shell attains 9.3 mm, its diameter is 3.9 mm.

== Distribution ==
This extinct marine species was found in Pliocene strata in the Bowden Formation, Jamaica; age range: 3.6 to 2.588 Ma.
