= Brachycythara barbarae =

Scientific classification
- Kingdom: Animalia
- Phylum: Mollusca
- Class: Gastropoda
- Subclass: Caenogastropoda
- Order: Neogastropoda
- Superfamily: Conoidea
- Family: Mangeliidae
- Genus: Brachycythara
- Species: B. barbarae

Binomial name
- Brachycythara barbarae Lyons, 1972

Species of gastropod

Brachycythara barbarae, common name Barbara's top spindle, is a species of sea snail, a marine gastropod mollusk in the family Mangeliidae.

== Description ==
The length of the shell attains 3.5 mm.

== Distribution ==
B. barbarae can be found in Atlantic Ocean waters, ranging from the coast of North Carolina south to Brazil, and in the Gulf of Mexico at depths up to 103 m.
