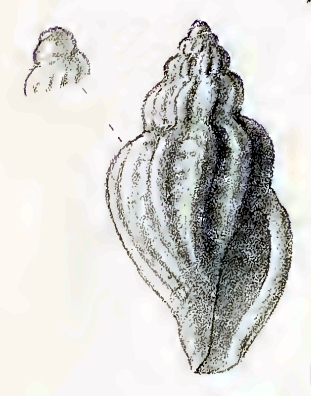
- Original image of a shell of Brachycythara nanodes

Scientific classification
- Kingdom: Animalia
- Phylum: Mollusca
- Class: Gastropoda
- Subclass: Caenogastropoda
- Order: Neogastropoda
- Superfamily: Conoidea
- Family: Mangeliidae
- Genus: Brachycythara
- Species: B. nanodes

Binomial name
- Brachycythara nanodes (Melvill, 1923)

Synonyms
- Mangelia nanodes J.C. Melvill, 1923

= Brachycythara nanodes =

Species of gastropod

Brachycythara nanodes is a species of sea snail, a marine gastropod mollusk in the family Mangeliidae.

== Description ==
The length of the shell attains 5.5 mm, the diameter 3 mm.

(Original description) The solid shell has an abbreviately fusiform shape. Its color is yellowish white. It contains 6 whorls of which two small, globular belong to the protoconch. The remainder are ventricose, much impressed suturally. The spire shows longitudinal incrassate smooth ribs, the interstices crossed by coarse infrequent spiral lines. The whorls are very tumid, the spiral lines at the interstices coarse. The aperture is oblong. The outer lip is thickened. The sinus is very obscure. The columellar margin is inclined to obliquity. The siphonal canal is extremely short.

== Distribution ==
B. nanodes can be found off the coast of Cuba.
