= Ithycythara chechoi =

Scientific classification
- Kingdom: Animalia
- Phylum: Mollusca
- Class: Gastropoda
- Subclass: Caenogastropoda
- Order: Neogastropoda
- Superfamily: Conoidea
- Family: Mangeliidae
- Genus: Ithycythara
- Species: I. chechoi

Binomial name
- Ithycythara chechoi Espinosa & Ortea, 2004

Species of gastropod

Ithycythara chechoi is a species of sea snail, a marine gastropod mollusk in the family Mangeliidae.

== Distribution ==
I. chechoi can be found in the Gulf of Mexico and the Caribbean waters, ranging from the Bahamas to Cuba at depths between 23 m and 52 m.
