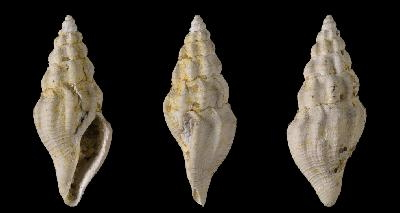
- Shell of Amblyacrum dameriacense (specimen at MNHN, Paris)

Scientific classification
- Kingdom: Animalia
- Phylum: Mollusca
- Class: Gastropoda
- Subclass: Caenogastropoda
- Order: Neogastropoda
- Superfamily: Conoidea
- Family: Mangeliidae
- Genus: †Amblyacrum
- Species: †A. dameriacense

Binomial name
- †Amblyacrum dameriacense (Deshayes, 1865)

Synonyms
- † Pleurotoma carinata Deshayes, 1834; † Pleurotoma dameriacensis Deshayes, 1865 (original combination); † Raphitoma defrancei Tucker & Le Renard, 1993

= Amblyacrum dameriacense =

Extinct species of gastropod

Amblyacrum dameriacense is an extinct species of sea snail, a marine gastropod mollusc in the family Mangeliidae.

It was renamed as Raphitoma defrancei by J. Tucker & Le Renard in 1993

== Distribution ==
Fossils of this extinct marine species were found in Eocene strata in France.
