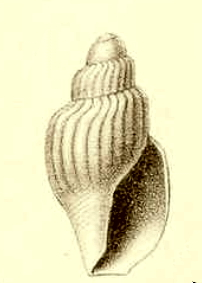
- Lorabela plicatula (Thiele, 1912); family Mangeliidae; Weddell Sea, Antarctica

Scientific classification
- Kingdom: Animalia
- Phylum: Mollusca
- Class: Gastropoda
- Subclass: Caenogastropoda
- Order: Neogastropoda
- Superfamily: Conoidea
- Family: Mangeliidae
- Genus: Lorabela; Powell, 1951

Type species
- Bela pelseneeri Strebel, 1908

Species
- See text

= Lorabela =

Genus of gastropods

Lorabela is a genus of sea snails, marine gastropod mollusks in the family Mangeliidae.

== Species ==
Species within the genus Lorabela include:

- Lorabela davisi (Hedley, 1916)
- Lorabela glacialis (Thiele, 1912)
- Lorabela pelseneeri (Strebel, 1908)
- Lorabela plicatula (Thiele, 1912)

Species brought into synonymy

- Lorabela bathybia (Strebel, 1908): synonym of Pleurotomella bathybia Strebel, 1908
- Lorabela notophila (Strebel, 1908): synonym of Strebela notophila (Strebel, 1908)
