= Brachycythara gibba =

Scientific classification
- Kingdom: Animalia
- Phylum: Mollusca
- Class: Gastropoda
- Subclass: Caenogastropoda
- Order: Neogastropoda
- Superfamily: Conoidea
- Family: Mangeliidae
- Genus: Brachycythara
- Species: B. gibba

Binomial name
- Brachycythara gibba (R.J.L. Guppy, 1896)

Synonyms
- Cythara gibba Guppy 1896

Extinct species of gastropod

Brachycythara gibba, is an extinct species of sea snail, a marine gastropod mollusk in the family Mangeliidae.

== Description ==
The shell reaches 4 mm in size.

== Distribution ==
This extinct marine species can be found in Pliocene strata of Jamaica and Miocene strata of the Dominican Republic; age range: 11.608 to 2.588 Ma
