= Ithycythara acutangulus =

Scientific classification
- Kingdom: Animalia
- Phylum: Mollusca
- Class: Gastropoda
- Subclass: Caenogastropoda
- Order: Neogastropoda
- Superfamily: Conoidea
- Family: Mangeliidae
- Genus: Ithycythara
- Species: I. acutangulus

Binomial name
- Ithycythara acutangulus (E. A. Smith, 1882)

Synonyms
- Pleurotoma (Mangilia ?) acutangulus Smith E. A., 1882

Species of gastropod

Ithycythara acutangulus is a species of sea snail, a marine gastropod mollusk in the family Mangeliidae.

== Description ==
The length of the shell attains 7.5 mm, its diameter 2.5 mm.

(Original description) The white shell has an elongate subfusiform shape. This species is remarkable for the acute angulations of the eight whorls, the spiral liration at the angle, and the purplish-red bands at the suture and the middle of the body whorl, the latter being visible within the aperture, which measures about ⅓ of the total length. The number of ribs appears to vary from seven to eight; and they are not quite regularly continuous from the apex downwards. The outer lip is incrassate and hardly sinuate. The siphonal canal is narrow and very short.
