= Belidaphne brunettii =

Scientific classification
- Kingdom: Animalia
- Phylum: Mollusca
- Class: Gastropoda
- Subclass: Caenogastropoda
- Order: Neogastropoda
- Superfamily: Conoidea
- Family: Mangeliidae
- Genus: †Belidaphne
- Species: †B. brunettii

Binomial name
- †Belidaphne brunettii Della Bella, Naldi & Scarponi, 2015

Extinct species of gastropod

Belidaphne brunettii is an extinct species of sea snails, a marine gastropod mollusc in the family Mangeliidae.

== Distribution ==
This extinct marine species was found in Italy.
