= Brachycythara alba =

Scientific classification
- Kingdom: Animalia
- Phylum: Mollusca
- Class: Gastropoda
- Subclass: Caenogastropoda
- Order: Neogastropoda
- Superfamily: Conoidea
- Family: Mangeliidae
- Genus: Brachycythara
- Species: B. alba

Binomial name
- Brachycythara alba (Adams C. B., 1850)

Synonyms
- Mangelia alba Adams C. B., 1850

Species of gastropod

Brachycythara alba is a species of sea snail, a marine gastropod mollusk in the family Mangeliidae, the cone snails and their allies.

== Description ==
The length of the shell attains 5.5 mm.

== Distribution ==
This species occurs in the Caribbean Sea and the Lesser Antilles.
