= Granotoma tumida =

Scientific classification
- Kingdom: Animalia
- Phylum: Mollusca
- Class: Gastropoda
- Subclass: Caenogastropoda
- Order: Neogastropoda
- Superfamily: Conoidea
- Family: Mangeliidae
- Genus: Granotoma
- Species: G. tumida

Binomial name
- Granotoma tumida (Posselt, 1898)

Synonyms
- Bela woodiana var. tumida Posselt, 1898 (basionym)

Species of gastropod

Granotoma tumida is a species of sea snail, a marine gastropod mollusk in the family Mangeliidae.

== Distribution ==
This marine species occurs off Greenland.
