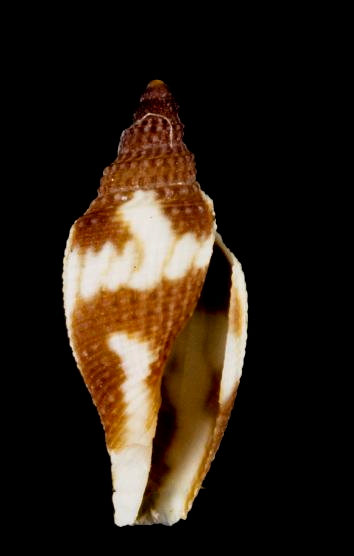
- Shell of Diaugasma olyra (specimen at MNHN, Paris)

Scientific classification
- Kingdom: Animalia
- Phylum: Mollusca
- Class: Gastropoda
- Subclass: Caenogastropoda
- Order: Neogastropoda
- Family: Raphitomidae
- Genus: Diaugasma
- Species: D. olyra

Binomial name
- Diaugasma olyra (Reeve, 1845)

Synonyms
- Daphnella (Diaugasma) olyra (Reeve, 1845); Pleurotoma olyra Reeve, 1845

= Diaugasma olyra =

Species of gastropod

Diaugasma olyra is a species of sea snail, a marine gastropod mollusk in the family Raphitomidae.

== Description ==
The length of the shell attains 11 mm. It can be distinguished from Diaugasma epicharta by its much larger size, say 11 mm. long, a wider aperture, a shorter spire, and a pink-tipped apex. It is likewise semi-transparent, and the very delicate spiral striation across the whorls is represented by the Reeve as sometimes evanescent altogether.

== Distribution ==
This marine species occurs off the Philippines and Taiwan.
