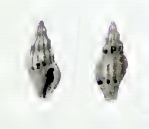
- Original image of a shell of Hemicythara octangulata

Scientific classification
- Kingdom: Animalia
- Phylum: Mollusca
- Class: Gastropoda
- Subclass: Caenogastropoda
- Order: Neogastropoda
- Superfamily: Conoidea
- Family: Mangeliidae
- Genus: Hemicythara
- Species: H. octangulata

Binomial name
- Hemicythara octangulata (Dunker, 1860)

Synonyms
- Clathurella octangulata (Dunker, 1860); Pleurotoma octangulata Dunker, 1860 (original combination)

= Hemicythara octangulata =

Species of gastropod

Hemicythara octangulata is a species of sea snail, a marine gastropod mollusk in the family Mangeliidae.

== Description ==
The length of the shell attains 10 mm, its diameter 4 mm.

The solid, subfusiform shell is ovately oblong and obtusely shouldered, strongly longitudinally ribbed (eight in the body whorl) and transversely substriate. The shell contains six whorls with a distinct suture. The aperture is narrow. The outer lip is slightly incrassate. The siphonal canal is very short. The columella is almost upright. The color of the shell is yellowish white, with an interrupted chestnut band.

== Distribution ==
This marine species occurs off Japan, Korea and the Philippines.
