= Belidaphne saldubensis =

Scientific classification
- Kingdom: Animalia
- Phylum: Mollusca
- Class: Gastropoda
- Subclass: Caenogastropoda
- Order: Neogastropoda
- Superfamily: Conoidea
- Family: Mangeliidae
- Genus: †Belidaphne
- Species: †B. saldubensis

Binomial name
- †Belidaphne saldubensis Vera-Peláez, 2002

Extinct species of gastropod

Belidaphne saldubensis is an extinct species of sea snail, a marine gastropod mollusk in the family Mangeliidae.

== Distribution ==
This extinct marine species was found in Pliocene strata in Spain.
