= Brachycythara biconica =

Scientific classification
- Kingdom: Animalia
- Phylum: Mollusca
- Class: Gastropoda
- Subclass: Caenogastropoda
- Order: Neogastropoda
- Superfamily: Conoidea
- Family: Mangeliidae
- Genus: Brachycythara
- Species: B. biconica

Binomial name
- Brachycythara biconica (C. B. Adams, 1850)

Synonyms
- Mangelia biconica Adams C. B., 1850; Mangelia (Brachycythara) biconica (Adams C. B., 1850)

Species of gastropod

Brachycythara biconica, common name the biconic top turrid, is a species of very small sea snail, a marine gastropod mollusk in the family Mangeliidae.

== Description ==
The length of the shell varies between 4 mm and 6 mm.

(Original description) The shell has a biconic shape. Its color is whitish, with a narrow spiral band of brown at the summit of the whorls, which is darker between the ribs, and a similar wider band a little anterior to the periphery of the body whorl (or some specimens may be described as pale brown, with a spiral band of white on the periphery of the whorls, and as white anteriorly). The shell shows strong transverse rounded ribs, about nine on each whorl, and excessively fine spiral rather distant raised lines, which are obsolete on the summits of the ribs. The protoconch is acute. The spire has the outlines nearly rectilinear. It contains six whorls, subangular, with a moderately impressed suture. The aperture is narrow. The outer lip is often much thickened by the last rib. The sinus is near the upper extremity of the outer lip, rather large in old shells. The siphonal canal is short.

== Distribution ==
B. biconica can be found in Atlantic Ocean waters, ranging from the coast of North Carolina south to Brazil.; in the Caribbean Sea, the Gulf of Mexico and the Lesser Antilles.
