= Ithycythara hyperlepta =

Scientific classification
- Kingdom: Animalia
- Phylum: Mollusca
- Class: Gastropoda
- Subclass: Caenogastropoda
- Order: Neogastropoda
- Superfamily: Conoidea
- Family: Mangeliidae
- Genus: Ithycythara
- Species: I. hyperlepta

Binomial name
- Ithycythara hyperlepta Haas, 1953

Species of gastropod

Ithycythara hyperlepta is a species of sea snail, a marine gastropod mollusk in the family Mangeliidae.

== Description ==
The length of the shell varies between 6 mm and 10 mm.

== Distribution ==
This marine species occurs from Colombia to Eastern Brazil.
