= Brachycythara brevis =

Scientific classification
- Kingdom: Animalia
- Phylum: Mollusca
- Class: Gastropoda
- Subclass: Caenogastropoda
- Order: Neogastropoda
- Superfamily: Conoidea
- Family: Mangeliidae
- Genus: Brachycythara
- Species: B. brevis

Binomial name
- Brachycythara brevis (Adams C. B., 1850)

Synonyms
- Mangelia brevis Adams C. B., 1850

Species of gastropod

Brachycythara brevis is a species of sea snail, a marine gastropod mollusk in the family Mangeliidae.

== Description ==
The length of the shell attains 4 mm.

(Original description) The short shell has a fusiform shape. Its color is orange or wax yellow, white along the upper part of the whorls and anteriorly. It shows very strong transverse ribs, about nine on each whorl, smooth on the summits, with unequal microscopic spiral elevated lines. The protoconch is subacute. The spire has very convex outlines. It contains about six whorls, moderately convex or subangular, with a lightly impressed suture. The aperture is quite narrow. The outer lip is much thickened by the last rib. The sinus is rather large. The siphonal canal is very short.

== Distribution ==
This marine species occurs in the Caribbean Sea off Jamaica and the Virgin Islands
