= Papillocithara hebes =

Scientific classification
- Kingdom: Animalia
- Phylum: Mollusca
- Class: Gastropoda
- Subclass: Caenogastropoda
- Order: Neogastropoda
- Superfamily: Conoidea
- Family: Mangeliidae
- Genus: Papillocithara
- Species: P. hebes

Binomial name
- Papillocithara hebes Kilburn, 1992

Species of gastropod

Papillocithara hebes is a species of sea snail in the family Mangeliidae. P. hebes earns its name from the Latin word hebes meaning blunt, due to its distinctive blunt Protoconch.

== Description ==
The length of the shell attains 13.5 mm, its diameter 5 mm.

== Distribution ==
This marine species can be found in Southern Africa and Mozambique, at depths ranging from 250-410 meters.
