= Venustoma harucoa =

Scientific classification
- Kingdom: Animalia
- Phylum: Mollusca
- Class: Gastropoda
- Subclass: Caenogastropoda
- Order: Neogastropoda
- Superfamily: Conoidea
- Family: Mangeliidae
- Genus: Venustoma
- Species: V. harucoa

Binomial name
- Venustoma harucoa Bartsch, 1941

Species of gastropod

Venustoma harucoa is a species of sea snail, a marine gastropod mollusk in the family Mangeliidae.

== Description ==
The length of the shell varies between 5 mm and 8 mm.

== Distribution ==
This marine species occurs off Japan and the Philippines.
