= Papillocithara semiplicata =

Scientific classification
- Kingdom: Animalia
- Phylum: Mollusca
- Class: Gastropoda
- Subclass: Caenogastropoda
- Order: Neogastropoda
- Superfamily: Conoidea
- Family: Mangeliidae
- Genus: Papillocithara
- Species: P. semiplicata

Binomial name
- Papillocithara semiplicata Kilburn, 1992

Species of gastropod

Papillocithara semiplicata is a species of sea snail, a marine gastropod mollusk in the family Mangeliidae.

== Description ==
The length of the shell attains 8.5 mm, its diameter is 3.9 mm.

== Distribution ==
This marine species occurs off KwaZulu-Natal, South Africa.
