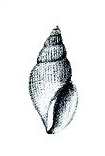
- Drawing of a shell of Granotoma albrechti

Scientific classification
- Kingdom: Animalia
- Phylum: Mollusca
- Class: Gastropoda
- Subclass: Caenogastropoda
- Order: Neogastropoda
- Superfamily: Conoidea
- Family: Mangeliidae
- Genus: Granotoma
- Species: G. albrechti

Binomial name
- Granotoma albrechti (Krause, 1885)

Synonyms
- Bela albrechti Krause, 1885

= Granotoma albrechti =

Species of gastropod

Granotoma albrechti is a species of sea snail, a marine gastropod mollusk in the family Mangeliidae.

== Description ==
The length of the shell varies between 6 mm and 11.5 mm.

(Original description in Latin) The shell is fusiform, somewhat thin, white, covered with a yellowish-ashy epidermis. It has five equally convex whorls, with the body whorl being twice as long as the spire. The suture is distinct. The aperture is widely open, equaling half the shell's length. The outer lip is distinctly emarginate at the suture, then evenly arched. The surface is finely reticulated with crowded, narrowly impressed spiral lines and slightly more conspicuous longitudinal lines. The operculum is of the usual shape.

== Distribution ==
This species occurs in the Bering Sea, the Arctic Ocean and the Sea of Japan.
