= Oenopotella ultraabyssalis =

Scientific classification
- Kingdom: Animalia
- Phylum: Mollusca
- Class: Gastropoda
- Subclass: Caenogastropoda
- Order: Neogastropoda
- Superfamily: Conoidea
- Family: Mangeliidae
- Genus: Oenopotella
- Species: O. ultraabyssalis

Binomial name
- Oenopotella ultraabyssalis Sysoev, 1988

Species of gastropod

Oenopotella ultraabyssalis is a species of sea snail, a marine gastropod mollusk in the family Mangeliidae.

There is one subspecies: Oenopotella ultraabyssalis aleutica A.V. Sysoev, 1988

== Description ==
The length of the shell attains 12.8mm. This species is a non-broadcast spawner.

== Distribution ==
This marine species was found in the Kurile-Kamchatka Trench, Northern Pacific.
