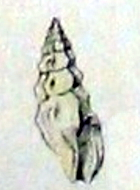
- Original image of a shell of Ithycythara pentagonalis

Scientific classification
- Kingdom: Animalia
- Phylum: Mollusca
- Class: Gastropoda
- Subclass: Caenogastropoda
- Order: Neogastropoda
- Superfamily: Conoidea
- Family: Mangeliidae
- Genus: Ithycythara
- Species: I. pentagonalis

Binomial name
- Ithycythara pentagonalis (Reeve, 1845)

Synonyms
- Pleurotoma pentagonalis Reeve, 1845

= Ithycythara pentagonalis =

Species of gastropod

Ithycythara pentagonalis is a species of sea snail, a marine gastropod mollusc in the family Mangeliidae.

Tucker considers Ithycythara auberiana a synonym of Ithycythara pentagonalis Reeve, L.A., 1845

== Description ==
The smooth, ivory white shell has an oblong-ovate shape. It is longitudinally five-angled. It shows compressed ribs at the angles, pointed at the upper part of the ribs.

== Distribution ==
This marine species occurs off St Vincent, West Indies.
