= Euryentmema australiana =

Scientific classification
- Kingdom: Animalia
- Phylum: Mollusca
- Class: Gastropoda
- Subclass: Caenogastropoda
- Order: Neogastropoda
- Superfamily: Conoidea
- Family: Mangeliidae
- Genus: Euryentmema
- Species: E. australiana

Binomial name
- Euryentmema australiana Shuto, 1983

Species of gastropod

Euryentmema australiana is a small sea snail, a marine gastropod mollusk in the family Mangeliidae.
