= Brachycythara turrita =

Scientific classification
- Kingdom: Animalia
- Phylum: Mollusca
- Class: Gastropoda
- Subclass: Caenogastropoda
- Order: Neogastropoda
- Superfamily: Conoidea
- Family: Mangeliidae
- Genus: Brachycythara
- Species: B. turrita

Binomial name
- Brachycythara turrita W.C. Mansfield, 1930

Extinct species of gastropod

Brachycythara turrita, is an extinct species of sea snail, a marine gastropod mollusk in the family Mangeliidae.

== Distribution ==
This extinct marine species can be found in Miocene strata of the Chotawhatchee Formation of Florida, United States.
