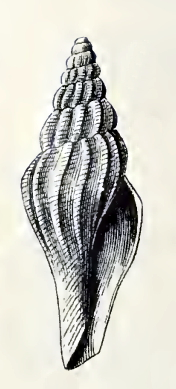
- Original image of a shell of Ithycythara cymella

Scientific classification
- Kingdom: Animalia
- Phylum: Mollusca
- Class: Gastropoda
- Subclass: Caenogastropoda
- Order: Neogastropoda
- Superfamily: Conoidea
- Family: Mangeliidae
- Genus: Ithycythara
- Species: I. cymella

Binomial name
- Ithycythara cymella (Dall, 1889)

Synonyms
- Cythara cymella Dall, 1889; Mangilia (Cythara) cymella Dall, 1889

= Ithycythara cymella =

Species of gastropod

Ithycythara cymella is a species of sea snail, a marine gastropod mollusk in the family Mangeliidae.

== Description ==
The length of the shell attains 20 mm.

(Original description) The long, slender shell has a subhyaline and polished aspect. It contains a small subglobular, vitreous, tilted protoconch of1½ whorls, and 5½ subsequent whorls. Its color is translucent, with a faint yellowish band in front of the suture, visible between the ribs, and two or three spiral series of faint spots on the ribs in front of the yellow on the body whorl, or all whitish. The spiral sculpture consists of numerous fine impressed lines, strongest on the ribs of which they faintly crenulate the crests, and well marked on the siphonal canal where the interspaces are slightly raised and rounded. The transverse sculpture consists of (on the body whorl ten) elevated ribs, not continuous from whorl to whorl, extending from suture to the siphonal canal. These are thin and slightly curved behind the periphery, a little swollen on the periphery and in front of it again diminishing. The suture is somewhat appressed, undulated by the ribs. The aperture is long, narrow. The notch is rounded and not deep. The varix behind the outer lip resembles a stronger rib. The thin outer lip is strongly arched forward. The siphonal canal is long and rather narrow. The inner lip is simple . The columella is straight, obliquely trimmed off in front. The whorls are moderately rounded under the ribs.

== Distribution ==
I. cymella can be found in the Gulf of Mexico and the Caribbean waters, ranging from the western coast of Florida to Barbados. at depths between 128 m and 402 m.
