= Petrafixia koeneni =

Scientific classification
- Kingdom: Animalia
- Phylum: Mollusca
- Class: Gastropoda
- Subclass: Caenogastropoda
- Order: Neogastropoda
- Superfamily: Conoidea
- Family: Mangeliidae
- Genus: †Petrafixia
- Species: †P. koeneni

Binomial name
- †Petrafixia koeneni (Cossmann & Lambert, 1884)

Synonyms
- † Bela koeneni (Cossmann & Lambert, 1884); † Fusus koeneni Cossmann & Lambert, 1884 (original combination)

Extinct species of gastropod

Petrafixia koeneni is an extinct species of sea snail, a marine gastropod mollusk in the family Mangeliidae.

== Distribution ==
This extinct marine species was found in Rupélien strata in Aquitaine, France.
