= Brachycythara dasa =

Scientific classification
- Kingdom: Animalia
- Phylum: Mollusca
- Class: Gastropoda
- Subclass: Caenogastropoda
- Order: Neogastropoda
- Superfamily: Conoidea
- Family: Mangeliidae
- Genus: Brachycythara
- Species: B. dasa

Binomial name
- Brachycythara dasa J. Gardner, 1937

Extinct species of gastropod

Brachycythara dasa, an extinct species of sea snail from the Early Miocene Era in Northern Florida, was a marine gastropod mollusk in the family Mangeliidae.

== Description ==
The length of the shell attains 4.6 mm, with a diameter of 2.2 mm. It is a small, stout, fusiform shell with whorls similar to M. cryptopleura.

== Distribution ==
This extinct marine species can be found in Early Miocene strata of the Alum Bluff Formation of Florida, United States.
