= Ithycythara parkeri =

Scientific classification
- Kingdom: Animalia
- Phylum: Mollusca
- Class: Gastropoda
- Subclass: Caenogastropoda
- Order: Neogastropoda
- Superfamily: Conoidea
- Family: Mangeliidae
- Genus: Ithycythara
- Species: I. parkeri

Binomial name
- Ithycythara parkeri Abbott, 1958

Species of gastropod

Ithycythara parkeri is a species of sea snail, a marine gastropod mollusk in the family Mangeliidae.

== Description ==
The length of the shell attains 6 mm.

== Distribution ==
I. parkeri can be found in the Atlantic Ocean, the Gulf of Mexico and Caribbean waters, ranging from the coast of North Carolina south to Colombia and surrounding Puerto Rico. at depths between 1 m and 55 m.
