= Kyllinia parentalis =

Scientific classification
- Kingdom: Animalia
- Phylum: Mollusca
- Class: Gastropoda
- Subclass: Caenogastropoda
- Order: Neogastropoda
- Superfamily: Conoidea
- Family: Mangeliidae
- Genus: Kyllinia
- Species: K. parentalis

Binomial name
- Kyllinia parentalis Garilli & Galletti, 2007

Extinct species of gastropod

Kyllinia parentalis is an extinct species of sea snail, a marine gastropod mollusk in the family Mangeliidae.

== Description ==
The length of the shell attains 11.2 mm.

== Distribution ==
Fossils of this marine species were found in Pliocene strata in North Italy and in Pleistocene strata of northwestern Peloponnesus, Greece.
