= Ithycythara funicostata =

Scientific classification
- Kingdom: Animalia
- Phylum: Mollusca
- Class: Gastropoda
- Subclass: Caenogastropoda
- Order: Neogastropoda
- Superfamily: Conoidea
- Family: Mangeliidae
- Genus: Ithycythara
- Species: I. funicostata

Binomial name
- Ithycythara funicostata Robba, Di Geronimo, Chaimanee, Negri & Sanfilippo, 2007

Species of gastropod

Ithycythara funicostata is a species of sea snail, a marine gastropod mollusk in the family Mangeliidae.

== Distribution ==
This species occurs in the Western Gulf of Thailand.
