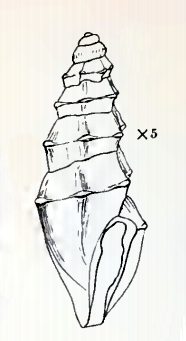
- Original image of a shell of Ithycythara psila

Scientific classification
- Kingdom: Animalia
- Phylum: Mollusca
- Class: Gastropoda
- Subclass: Caenogastropoda
- Order: Neogastropoda
- Superfamily: Conoidea
- Family: Mangeliidae
- Genus: Ithycythara
- Species: I. psila

Binomial name
- Ithycythara psila (K. Bush, 1885)

Synonyms
- † Ithycythara kellumi Fargo, W.G., 1953; Mangelia psila Bush, 1885

= Ithycythara psila =

Species of gastropod

Ithycythara psila is a species of sea snail, a marine gastropod mollusk in the family Mangeliidae.

== Description ==
The length of the pink-tipped, transparent shell attains 7.1 mm, its diameter 2.5 mm.

Original description:

This is a shell of moderate size, slender, rather thick, very plain, yellowish white, with a dull, lusterless surface. It contains about 6½ elongated whorls, decidedly angulated, forming an elongated, blunt spire. The suture is defined by an indistinct, undulating line. A very few prominent, narrow, straight ribs (six on the body whorl) cross the whorls from suture to suture, separated by very wide, concave interspaces. A single rounded thread revolves on the periphery at the shoulder of the whorls, scarcely visible on the interspaces, but forming conspicuous, oblong nodules on the ribs. On the body whorl the ribs continue to the end of the siphonal canal curving in from its base, towards the aperture. On the ventral surface of the siphonal canal there are five or six very indistinct, oblique striae. The surface is everywhere crossed by conspicuous, flexuous lines of growth. The protoconch is rather large, composed of 2½ regularly coiled, nearly smooth, somewhat shining whorls, the second having a row of minute nodules or beads on the periphery. The aperture lis ong, narrow, of nearly uniform width. The outer lip is thin, nearly straight, broadly rounded anteriorly, with a decided sinus just below the suture. Within the aperture, underneath the first external rib, there is a line of small, oblong nodules. The inner lip is continuous with the outer, with a thin, free edge. The columella is very slightly curved, with a small horizontal fold or tooth about the posterior third.

== Distribution ==
I. psila can be found in Atlantic waters, ranging from the coast of North Carolina south to Venezuela.
