= Brachycythara multicincta =

Scientific classification
- Kingdom: Animalia
- Phylum: Mollusca
- Class: Gastropoda
- Subclass: Caenogastropoda
- Order: Neogastropoda
- Superfamily: Conoidea
- Family: Mangeliidae
- Genus: Brachycythara
- Species: B. multicincta

Binomial name
- Brachycythara multicincta Rolan & Espinosa, 1999

Synonyms
- Brachycythara multicinctata Rolán & Espinosa, 1999 (misspelling)

Species of gastropod

Brachycythara multicincta is a species of sea snail in the family Mangeliidae.

== Description ==
The length of the shell attains 2.9 mm.

== Distribution ==
B. multicincta can be found in the Gulf of Mexico and in the Caribbean Sea off the coast of Cuba.
