= Brachycythara galae =

Scientific classification
- Kingdom: Animalia
- Phylum: Mollusca
- Class: Gastropoda
- Subclass: Caenogastropoda
- Order: Neogastropoda
- Superfamily: Conoidea
- Family: Mangeliidae
- Genus: Brachycythara
- Species: B. galae

Binomial name
- Brachycythara galae Fargo, 1953

Species of gastropod

Brachycythara galae is a species of sea snail, a marine gastropod mollusk in the family Mangeliidae.

== Description ==
The length of the shell attains 11 mm.

== Distribution ==
B. galae can be found in the Caribbean Sea, ranging from the coast of Louisiana to Quintana Roo. and the Gulf of Mexico
