= Toxicochlespira pagoda =

Scientific classification
- Kingdom: Animalia
- Phylum: Mollusca
- Class: Gastropoda
- Subclass: Caenogastropoda
- Order: Neogastropoda
- Superfamily: Conoidea
- Family: Mangeliidae
- Genus: Toxicochlespira
- Species: T. pagoda

Binomial name
- Toxicochlespira pagoda Sysoev & Kantor, 1990

Species of gastropod

Toxicochlespira pagoda is a species of sea snail, a marine gastropod mollusk in the family Mangeliidae.

== Distribution ==
T. pagoda occurs in the Ceram Sea of Indonesia, and off the Philippines, as well as the coastal waters off Guadalcanal and New Guinea.
