= Brachycythara reidenbachi =

Scientific classification
- Kingdom: Animalia
- Phylum: Mollusca
- Class: Gastropoda
- Subclass: Caenogastropoda
- Order: Neogastropoda
- Superfamily: Conoidea
- Family: Mangeliidae
- Genus: Brachycythara
- Species: B. reidenbachi

Binomial name
- Brachycythara reidenbachi Ward & B.W. Blackwelder, 1987

Extinct species of gastropod

Brachycythara reidenbachi, is an extinct species of sea snail, a marine gastropod mollusk in the family Mangeliidae.

== Distribution ==
This extinct marine species can be found in Late Pliocene and Early Pleistocene strata in the James City and Chowan River, Chowan River Formations of North Carolina, United States; age range: 11.608 to 2.588 Ma
