= Granotoma kobelti =

Scientific classification
- Kingdom: Animalia
- Phylum: Mollusca
- Class: Gastropoda
- Subclass: Caenogastropoda
- Order: Neogastropoda
- Superfamily: Conoidea
- Family: Mangeliidae
- Genus: Granotoma
- Species: G. kobelti

Binomial name
- Granotoma kobelti (Verkrüzen, 1876)

Synonyms
- Bela kobelti Verkrüzen, 1876 (original combination); Oenopota kobelti (Verkrüzen, T.A., 1876)

Species of gastropod

Granotoma kobelti is a species of sea snail, a marine gastropod mollusk in the family Mangeliidae.

== Description ==
The shell much resembles that of Curtitoma trevelliana (Turton, 1834), but the body whorl is relatively larger. The sculpture is easily distinguished by the very irregular strength of the spiral lines, and the siphonal canal is also more open than in C. trevelliana. The protoconch is smooth and mammiform, and the first whorl has two spiral ribs.

== Distribution ==
This marine species occurs in the Arctic region and off Lapland.
