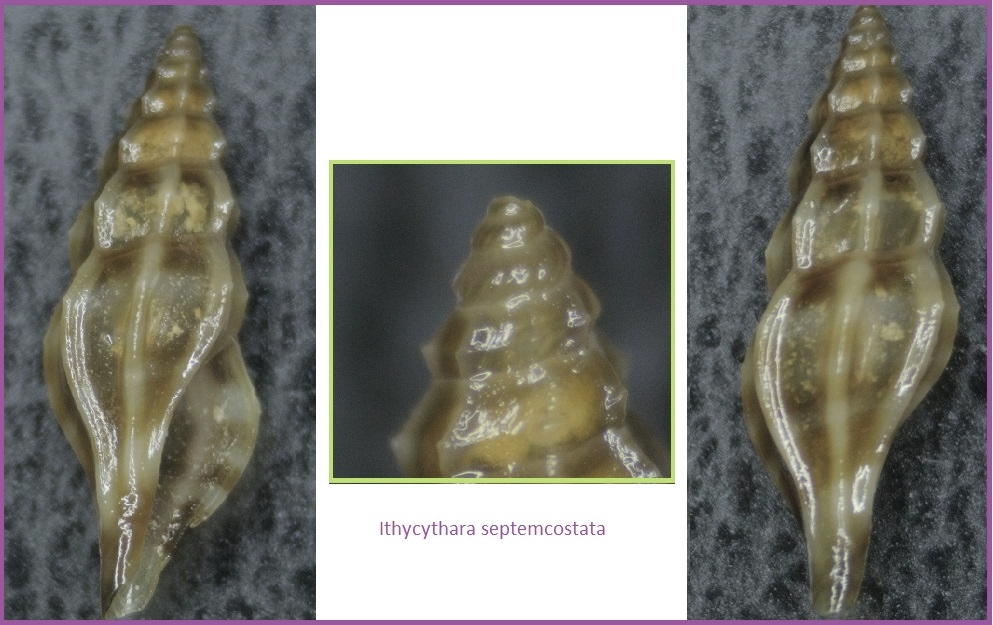
- Shell of Ithycythara septemcostata

Scientific classification
- Kingdom: Animalia
- Phylum: Mollusca
- Class: Gastropoda
- Subclass: Caenogastropoda
- Order: Neogastropoda
- Superfamily: Conoidea
- Family: Mangeliidae
- Genus: Ithycythara
- Species: I. septemcostata

Binomial name
- Ithycythara septemcostata (Schepman, 1913)

Synonyms
- Mangilia septemcostata Schepman, 1913

= Ithycythara septemcostata =

Species of gastropod

Ithycythara septemcostata is a species of sea snail, a marine gastropod mollusk in the family Mangeliidae.

== Description ==
The length of the shell attains 9 mm, its diameter 3.5 mm.

The strong, fusiform shell has a rather long siphonal canal. it is light yellowish-brown, with faint red-brown bands, interrupted by the ribs. There is one rather broad band, just below suture, the second below the periphery, a third near the base of the body whorl. The base of the siphonal canal is likewise tinted. The shell contains about 7 1/2 whorls, 2 1/2 form the convexly whorled protoconch, of which about the first whorl is smooth, the other ones are closely ribbed. The subsequent whorls are slightly convex, each with 7 continuous ribs, which have a small sharp point a little above the conspicuous, waved suture and are faintly crenulated, especially on lower part of the body whorl. The interstices are smooth, but for a faint spiral, connecting the costal points and a few spirals on the siphonal canal. The aperture is oblong, sharply angular above, with a rather long, narrow siphonal canal below. The peristome is not developed, probably with a shallow sinus above. The columellar margin is nearly straight, slightly directed to the left along the siphonal canal.

== Distribution ==
This marine species occurs off Java, Indonesia.
