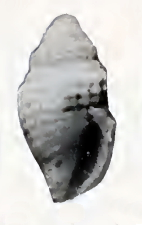
- Original image of a shell of Venustoma lacunosa

Scientific classification
- Kingdom: Animalia
- Phylum: Mollusca
- Class: Gastropoda
- Subclass: Caenogastropoda
- Order: Neogastropoda
- Superfamily: Conoidea
- Family: Mangeliidae
- Genus: Venustoma
- Species: V. lacunosa

Binomial name
- Venustoma lacunosa (Gould, 1860)

Synonyms
- Clathurella lacunosa Gould, 1860 (original combination)

= Venustoma lacunosa =

Species of gastropod

Venustoma lacunosa is a species of sea snail, a marine gastropod mollusk in the family Mangeliidae.

== Description ==
The length of the shell varies between 5 mm and 8 mm.

The small shell has an broadly, ovate shape. The six whorls are ornamented by well developed, sigmoid axial ribs and almost equally strong spiral cords, the junction of which produce rounded tubercles The whorls of the blunt spire show a roundly sloping shoulder. The pear-shaped aperture measures half the total length and has a weak sinus at the shoulder of the outer lip. The incrassate outer lip has a smooth interior. The stout columella is slightly bent.

== Distribution ==
This marine species occurs off Hong Kong and the Philippines
