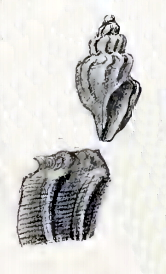
- Original image of a shell of Lorabela pelseneeri

Scientific classification
- Kingdom: Animalia
- Phylum: Mollusca
- Class: Gastropoda
- Subclass: Caenogastropoda
- Order: Neogastropoda
- Superfamily: Conoidea
- Family: Mangeliidae
- Genus: Lorabela
- Species: L. pelseneeri

Binomial name
- Lorabela pelseneeri (Strebel, 1908)

Synonyms
- Bela pelseneeri Strebel, 1908 (original combination); Bela pelseneri Strebel, 1908 (incorrect original spelling: named after Paul Pelseneer); Oenopota pelseneeri (Strebel, 1908)

= Lorabela pelseneeri =

Species of gastropod

Lorabela pelseneeri is a species of sea snail, a marine gastropod mollusk in the family Mangeliidae.

== Description ==
The length of the shell attains 8 mm.

(Original description in German) The shell is solid and white, covered in a dull, yellowish-brown cuticle. Its whorls are distinctly angular at the top, causing them to descend in a step-like fashion. The body whorl is constricted at the base and features a fairly deep, albeit narrow, sinus located just below the suture at the aperture. The columellar callus is narrow.

The sculpture is composed of fine growth lines and prominent ribs that follow the direction of growth; these ribs are sharply curved at the top and then descend in a gentle outward arc, though they do not reach the base of the body whorl. There are ten ribs present on both the penultimate and final whorls. These are intersected by very fine spiral ridges, which fade away on the slope toward the suture. There are 10 of these ridges on the penultimate whorl and 35 on the body whorl, counting downward from the shoulder. Finally, the operculum corresponds entirely to the standard type in this genus.

== Distribution ==
This species occurs in the Weddell Sea, Antarctica, and off the South Georgia Islands.
