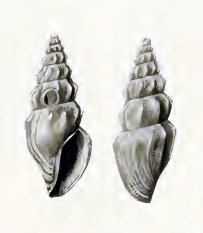
- Original image of a shell of Stellatoma rufostrigata

Scientific classification
- Kingdom: Animalia
- Phylum: Mollusca
- Class: Gastropoda
- Subclass: Caenogastropoda
- Order: Neogastropoda
- Superfamily: Conoidea
- Family: Mangeliidae
- Genus: Stellatoma
- Species: S. rufostrigata

Binomial name
- Stellatoma rufostrigata (Schepman, 1913)

Synonyms
- Mangilia rufostrigata Schepman, 1913 (original combination)

= Stellatoma rufostrigata =

Species of gastropod

Stellatoma rufostrigata is a species of sea snail, a marine gastropod mollusk in the family Mangeliidae.

== Description ==
The adult shell grows to a length of 10 mm, its diameter 4.25 mm.

(Original description) The shortly fusiform shell has a short siphonal canal. It is smooth and shining. It is yellowish-while, with more or less conspicuous traces of red-brown streaks on rihs. The shell contains 7 whorls, of which a little more than one forms a convex, smooth protoconch. The subsequent whorls are separated by a deep, waved suture. They are convex, angular and slightly excavated at their upper part. They show rather strong, rounded, oblique, axial ribs (11 on the body whorl), those behind the peristome stronger. These ribs are pointedly tubercled about their median part, just below the excavation in upper whorls and at the shoulder of the body whorl. On this latter the ribs are fainter towards the base, otherwise the shell is nearly smooth, but for very faint, remote spirals, a little more conspicuous on the siphonal canal, and fine growth lines. The aperture is oval, angular above, with a wide, short siphonal canal below. The peristome is thin, broken, with a shallow sinus above. The columellar margin is concave, slightly directed to the left below, with a rather thin layer of enamel, stronger near its base.

== Distribution ==
This species is found in the Halmahera Sea off Indonesia.
