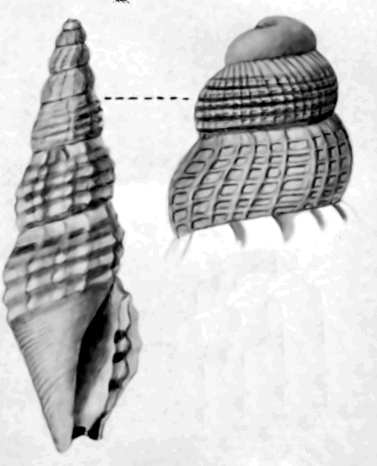
- Original image of a shell (and its protoconch) of Cacodaphnella delgada

Scientific classification
- Kingdom: Animalia
- Phylum: Mollusca
- Class: Gastropoda
- Subclass: Caenogastropoda
- Order: Neogastropoda
- Superfamily: Conoidea
- Family: Mangeliidae
- Genus: Cacodaphnella
- Species: C. delgada

Binomial name
- Cacodaphnella delgada Pilsbry & Lowe, 1932

= Cacodaphnella delgada =

Species of gastropod

Cacodaphnella delgada, is a species of sea snail, a marine gastropod mollusk in the family Mangeliidae.

== Description ==
The length of the shell attains 8 mm.

== Distribution ==
This species can be found in the Pacific Ocean off Nicaragua
