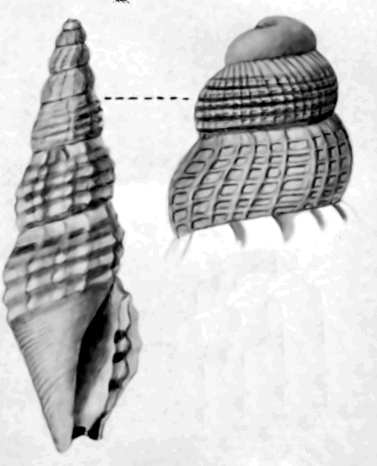
- Original image of a shell of Cacodaphnella delgada

Scientific classification
- Kingdom: Animalia
- Phylum: Mollusca
- Class: Gastropoda
- Subclass: Caenogastropoda
- Order: Neogastropoda
- Superfamily: Conoidea
- Family: Mangeliidae
- Genus: Cacodaphnella; Pilsbry & Lowe, 1932

Type species
- Cacodaphnella delgada Pilsbry & Lowe, 1932

Species
- See text

= Cacodaphnella =

Genus of gastropods

Cacodaphnella is a monotypic genus of very small predatory sea snails, marine gastropod mollusks in the family Mangeliidae.

== Species ==
Species within the genus Cacodaphnella include:

- Cacodaphnella delgada Pilsbry & Lowe, 1932
