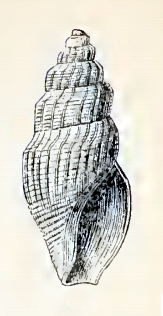
- Shell of Granotoma krausei

Scientific classification
- Kingdom: Animalia
- Phylum: Mollusca
- Class: Gastropoda
- Subclass: Caenogastropoda
- Order: Neogastropoda
- Superfamily: Conoidea
- Family: Mangeliidae
- Genus: Granotoma; Bartsch, 1941

Type species
- Bela krausei Dall, 1887

Species
- See text

= Granotoma =

Genus of gastropods

Granotoma is a genus of sea snails, marine gastropod mollusks in the family Mangeliidae.

== Species ==
Species within the genus Granotoma include:

- Granotoma albrechti (Krause, 1885)
- Granotoma dissoluta (Yokoyama, 1926)
- Granotoma kobelti (Verkrüzen, 1876)
- Granotoma krausei (Dall, 1887)
- Granotoma tumida (Posselt, 1898)

Species brought into synonymy

- Granotoma raduga (Bogdanov, I.P., 1985): synonym of Oenopota raduga Bogdanov, 1985
