= Oenopotella =

Scientific classification
- Kingdom: Animalia
- Phylum: Mollusca
- Class: Gastropoda
- Subclass: Caenogastropoda
- Order: Neogastropoda
- Superfamily: Conoidea
- Family: Mangeliidae
- Genus: Oenopotella; A. Sysoev, 1988

Type species
- Oenopotella ultraabyssalis A. Sysoev, 1988

Species
- See text

Genus of gastropods

Oenopotella is a genus of sea snails, marine gastropod mollusks in the family Mangeliidae.

== Species ==
- Oenopotella ultraabyssalis Sysoev, 1988
