= Papillocithara =

Scientific classification
- Kingdom: Animalia
- Phylum: Mollusca
- Class: Gastropoda
- Subclass: Caenogastropoda
- Order: Neogastropoda
- Superfamily: Conoidea
- Family: Mangeliidae
- Genus: Papillocithara; Kilburn, 1992

Type species
- Papillocithara hebes Kilburn, 1992

Species
- See text

Genus of gastropods

Papillocithara is a genus of sea snails, marine gastropod mollusks in the family Mangeliidae.

== Species ==
- Papillocithara hebes Kilburn, 1992
- Papillocithara semiplicata Kilburn, 1992
