= Granoturris =

Scientific classification
- Kingdom: Animalia
- Phylum: Mollusca
- Class: Gastropoda
- Subclass: Caenogastropoda
- Order: Neogastropoda
- Superfamily: Conoidea
- Family: Mangeliidae
- Genus: Granoturris; Fargo, 1953

Species
- See text

Genus of gastropods

Granoturris is a genus of sea snails, marine gastropod mollusks in the family Mangeliidae.

== Species ==
Species within the genus Granoturris include:

- Granoturris padolina Fargo, 1953
- Granoturris presleyi Lyons, 1972

Species brought into synonymy

- Granoturris rhysa (Watson, R.B., 1881): synonym of Kurtziella rhysa (Watson, 1881)
