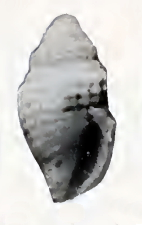
- Venustoma lacunosa

Scientific classification
- Kingdom: Animalia
- Phylum: Mollusca
- Class: Gastropoda
- Subclass: Caenogastropoda
- Order: Neogastropoda
- Superfamily: Conoidea
- Family: Mangeliidae
- Genus: Venustoma; Bartsch, 1941

Type species
- Venustoma harucoa Bartsch, 1941

Species
- See text

= Venustoma =

Genus of gastropods

Venustoma is a genus of sea snails, marine gastropod mollusks in the family Mangeliidae.

== Species ==
Species within the genus Venustoma include:

- Venustoma harucoa Bartsch, 1941
- Venustoma lacunosa (Gould, 1860)
