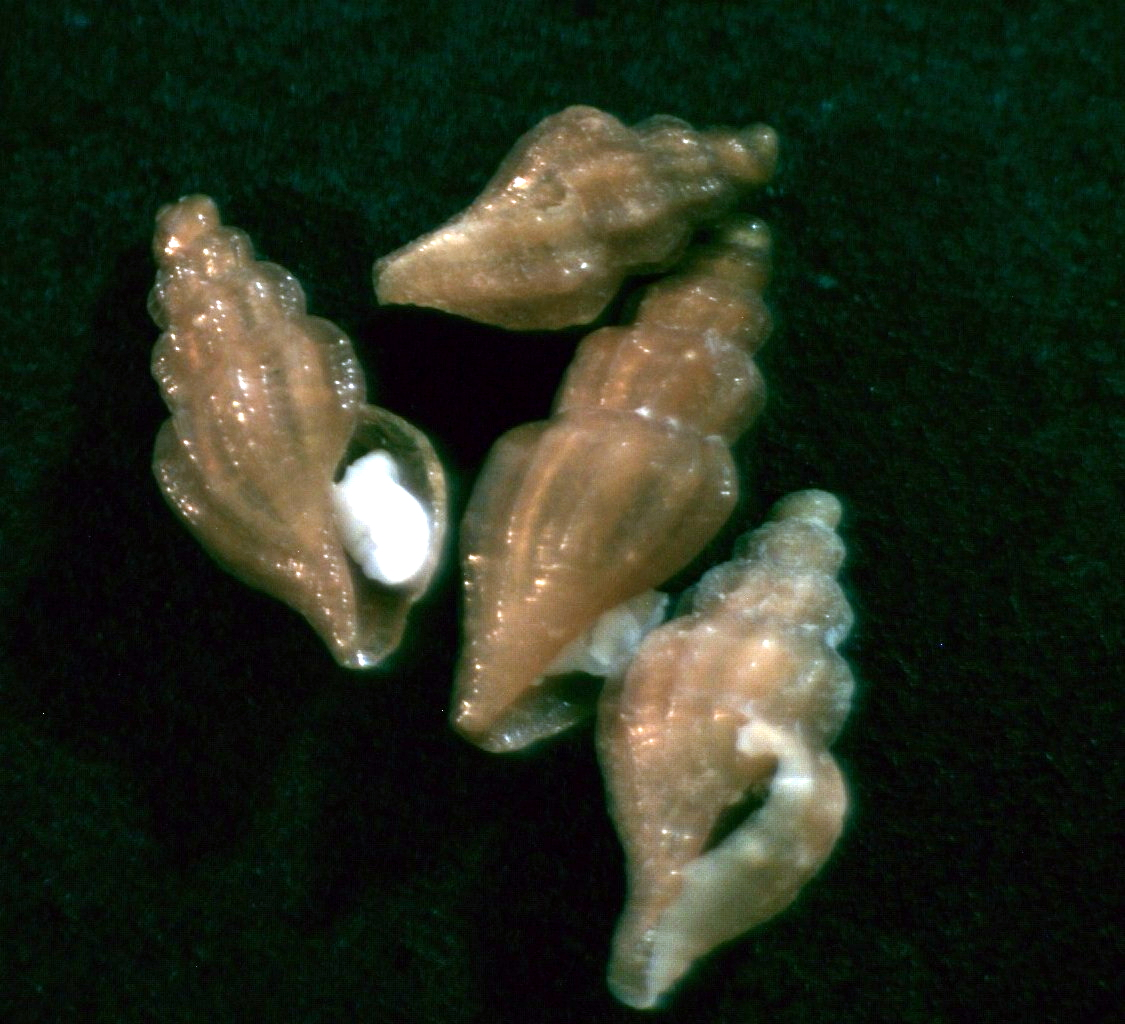
- Stellatoma stellata

Scientific classification
- Kingdom: Animalia
- Phylum: Mollusca
- Class: Gastropoda
- Subclass: Caenogastropoda
- Order: Neogastropoda
- Superfamily: Conoidea
- Family: Mangeliidae
- Genus: Stellatoma; Bartsch & Rehder, 1939

Type species
- Mangelia stellata Stearns, 1872

Species
- See text

= Stellatoma =

Genus of gastropods

Stellatoma is a genus of sea snails, marine gastropod mollusks in the family Mangeliidae.

== Species ==
Species within the genus Stellatoma include:

- Stellatoma discors Fallon, 2026
- Stellatoma flavobrunnea Fallon, 2026
- Stellatoma hemphilli (Bartsch & Rehder, 1939)
- Stellatoma krisbergi Fallon, 2026
- Stellatoma luciae Fallon, 2026
- Stellatoma mellissi (E. A. Smith, 1890)
- Stellatoma pulex Fallon, 2026
- Stellatoma rufostrigata (Schepman, 1913)
- Stellatoma stellata (Stearns, 1872)
