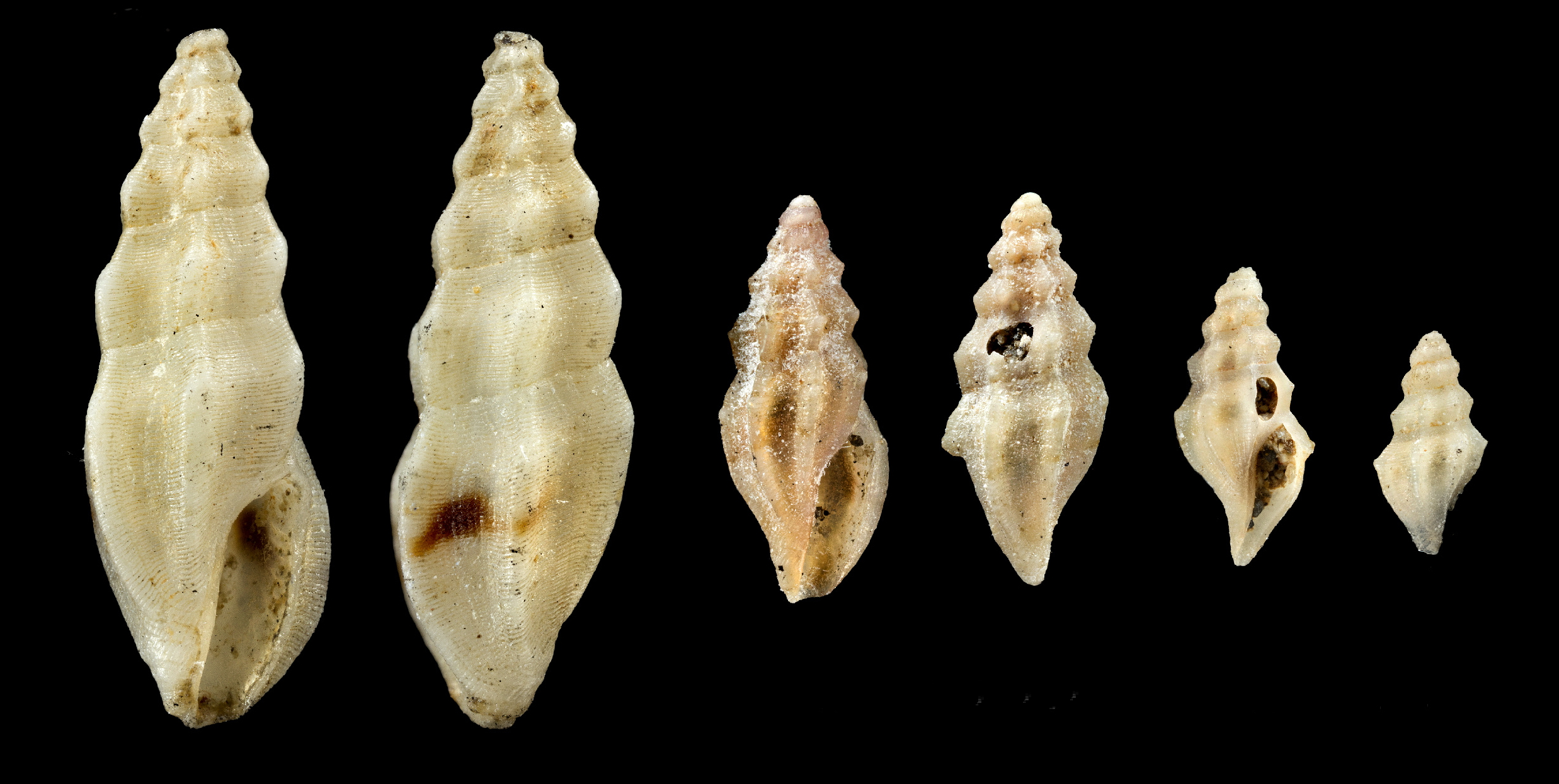
- Shell of Ithycythara auberiana (specimen at the Natural History Museum, London)

Scientific classification
- Kingdom: Animalia
- Phylum: Mollusca
- Class: Gastropoda
- Subclass: Caenogastropoda
- Order: Neogastropoda
- Superfamily: Conoidea
- Family: Mangeliidae
- Genus: Ithycythara
- Species: I. auberiana

Binomial name
- Ithycythara auberiana (d’Orbigny, 1847)

Synonyms
- Clathurella auberiana (d'Orbigny, 1847); Defrancia auberiana (d'Orbigny, 1847); Pleurotoma auberiana d'Orbigny, 1847

= Ithycythara auberiana =

Species of gastropod

Ithycythara auberiana is a species of sea snail, a marine gastropod mollusk in the family Mangeliidae.

Tucker considers this species a synonym of Ithycythara pentagonalis Reeve, L.A., 1845

Icythara rubricata (Reeve, 1846) may be an older name for this species; see Williams (2005).

== Description ==
The length of the shell varies between 4 mm and 8 mm.

== Distribution ==
I. auberiana can be found in Atlantic waters, ranging from the eastern coast of Florida south to Brazil.; in the Caribbean Sea, the Gulf of Mexico and the Lesser Antilles at depths between 1 m and 100 m.
