= Rhomboturris =

Scientific classification
- Kingdom: Animalia
- Phylum: Mollusca
- Class: Gastropoda
- Subclass: Caenogastropoda
- Order: Neogastropoda
- Superfamily: Conoidea
- Family: Mangeliidae
- Genus: Rhomboturris; Fallon, 2026

Type species
- Rhomboturris corbariae Fallon & Bouchet, 2026

Species
- See text

Genus of gastropods

Rhomboturris is a genus of sea snails, marine gastropod mollusks in the family Mangeliidae.

== Species ==
- Rhomboturris brychia Fallon & Bouchet, 2026
- Rhomboturris corbariae Fallon & Bouchet, 2026
- Rhomboturris kantori Fallon & Bouchet, 2026
