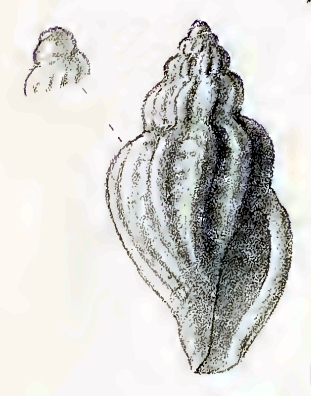
- Image of a shell of Brachycythara nanodes

Scientific classification
- Kingdom: Animalia
- Phylum: Mollusca
- Class: Gastropoda
- Subclass: Caenogastropoda
- Order: Neogastropoda
- Superfamily: Conoidea
- Family: Mangeliidae
- Genus: Brachycythara; Woodring, 1928

Type species
- Brachycythara gibba Guppy, R.J.L. in Guppy, R.J.L. & W.H. Dall, 1896

Species
- See text

= Brachycythara =

Genus of gastropods

Brachycythara is a genus of very small predatory sea snails, marine gastropod mollusks in the family Mangeliidae.

== Description ==
(Original description) The shell is small, stout and biconic. The protoconch is small-tipped, consisting of about 3 very rapidly enlarging whorls. The body whorl is sculptured with crowded, protractive, curved, axial riblets. The aperture is long and narrow. The base of the shell is barely emarginate. The anterior canal is not differentiated. The outer lip is not varicose, except at intervals corresponding to axial ribs. The anal notch is shallow. Specimens with a perfectly formed outer lip show a low denticle below the notch well within the aperture. The parietal callus is moderately thickened adjoining notch. The sculpture consists of axial ribs, barely overridden by fine spiral threads, and of microscopic frosted spirals.

Brachycythara is a genus of small, biconic turrids having a very rapidly enlarging axially sculptured protoconch, non-varicose outer lip, and no anterior canal.

== Species ==
Species within the genus Brachycythara include:

- Brachycythara alba (Adams C. B., 1850)
- Brachycythara barbarae Lyons, 1972
- Brachycythara biconica (C. B. Adams, 1850)
- Brachycythara brevis (Adams C. B., 1850)
- † Brachycythara dasa J. Gardner, 1937
- Brachycythara galae Fargo, 1953
- † Brachycythara gibba Guppy, R.J.L. in Guppy, R.J.L. & W.H. Dall, 1896
- Brachycythara multicincta Rolan & Espinosa, 1999
- Brachycythara nanodes (Melvill, 1923)
- † Brachycythara reidenbachi Ward & B.W. Blackwelder, 1987
- † Brachycythara turrita W.C. Mansfield, 1930

Species brought into synonymy

- Brachycythara atlantidea (Knudsen, 1952): synonym of Bela atlantidea (Knudsen, 1952)
- Brachycythara beatriceae Mariottini, 2007: synonym of Bela beatriceae (Mariottini, 2007)
- Brachycythara multicinctata Rolán & Espinosa, 1999: synonym of Brachycythara multicincta Rolán & Espinosa, 1999
- Brachycythara stegeri Nowell-Usticke, 1959: synonym of Splendrillia stegeri (Nowell-Usticke, 1959)
