= Vexiguraleus clifdenensis =

Scientific classification
- Kingdom: Animalia
- Phylum: Mollusca
- Class: Gastropoda
- Subclass: Caenogastropoda
- Order: Neogastropoda
- Superfamily: Conoidea
- Family: Mangeliidae
- Genus: †Vexiguraleus
- Species: †V. clifdenensis

Binomial name
- †Vexiguraleus clifdenensis A.W.B. Powell, 1942

Extinct species of gastropod

Vexiguraleus clifdenensis is an extinct species of sea snail, a marine gastropod mollusk in the family Mangeliidae.

== Distribution ==
This extinct marine species can be found in Cenozoic strata in New Zealand
