= Kyllinia =

Scientific classification
- Kingdom: Animalia
- Phylum: Mollusca
- Class: Gastropoda
- Subclass: Caenogastropoda
- Order: Neogastropoda
- Superfamily: Conoidea
- Family: Mangeliidae
- Genus: Kyllinia; Garilli & Galletti, 2007

Type species
- † Kyllinia parentalis Garilli & Galletti, 2007

Species
- See text

Genus of gastropods

Kyllinia is a genus of small, predatory sea snails, marine gastropod mollusks in the family Mangeliidae.

== Species ==
Species within the genus Kyllinia include:

- Kyllinia marchadi (Knudsen, 1956)
- † Kyllinia parentalis Garilli & Galletti, 2007
