= Belidaphne =

Scientific classification
- Kingdom: Animalia
- Phylum: Mollusca
- Class: Gastropoda
- Subclass: Caenogastropoda
- Order: Neogastropoda
- Superfamily: Conoidea
- Family: Mangeliidae
- Genus: †Belidaphne; Vera-Peláez, 2002

Species
- See text

Extinct genus of gastropods

Belidaphne is a genus of extinct sea snails, marine gastropod mollusks in the family Mangeliidae.

== Species ==
Species within the genus Belidaphne include:

- † Belidaphne brunettii Della Bella, Naldi & Scarponi, 2015
- † Belidaphne hypoglypta (Fontannes, 1880)
- † Belidaphne saldubensis Vera-Peláez, 2002
