= Apitua =

Scientific classification
- Kingdom: Animalia
- Phylum: Mollusca
- Class: Gastropoda
- Subclass: Caenogastropoda
- Order: Neogastropoda
- Superfamily: Conoidea
- Family: Mangeliidae
- Genus: Apitua; Laseron, 1954

Type species
- Apitua delicatula Laseron, 1954

Species
- See text

Genus of gastropods

Apitua is a genus of sea snails, marine gastropod mollusks in the family Mangeliidae.

== Species ==
Species within the genus Apitua include:

- Apitua delicatula Laseron, 1954
