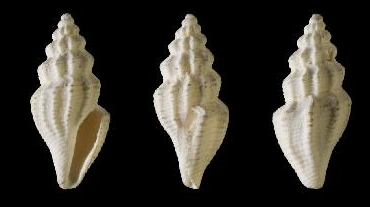
- Shell of Amblyacrum bernayi (holotype in MNHN, Paris)

Scientific classification
- Kingdom: Animalia
- Phylum: Mollusca
- Class: Gastropoda
- Subclass: Caenogastropoda
- Order: Neogastropoda
- Superfamily: Conoidea
- Family: Mangeliidae
- Genus: †Amblyacrum; Cossmann, 1889

Type species
- † Pleurotoma rugosa Deshayes, 1834

Species
- See text

= Amblyacrum =

Extinct genus of sea snails

Amblyacrum is a genus of extinct minute sea snails, marine gastropod mollusks or micromollusks in the family Mangeliidae.

== Species ==
Species within the genus Amblyacrum include:

- † Amblyacrum adrienpeyroti Lozouet, 2017
- † Amblyacrum bernayi Cossmann, 1889
- † Amblyacrum dameriacense (Deshayes, 1865)
- † Amblyacrum exiguum (Peyrot, 1931)
- † Amblyacrum gougeroti (J. K. Tucker & Le Renard, 1993)
- † Amblyacrum otites Lozouet, 2017
- † Amblyacrum tabulatum (Conrad, 1833)
- † Amblyacrum tauziedense Lozouet, 2017

Species brought into synonymy

- † Amblyacrum rugosum (Deshayes, 1834): synonym of † Amblyacrum gougeroti (J. K. Tucker & Le Renard, 1993)
- † Amblyacrum tauziedensis Lozouet, 2017 : synonym of † Amblyacrum tauziedense Lozouet, 2017 (wrong gender agreement of specific epithet)
