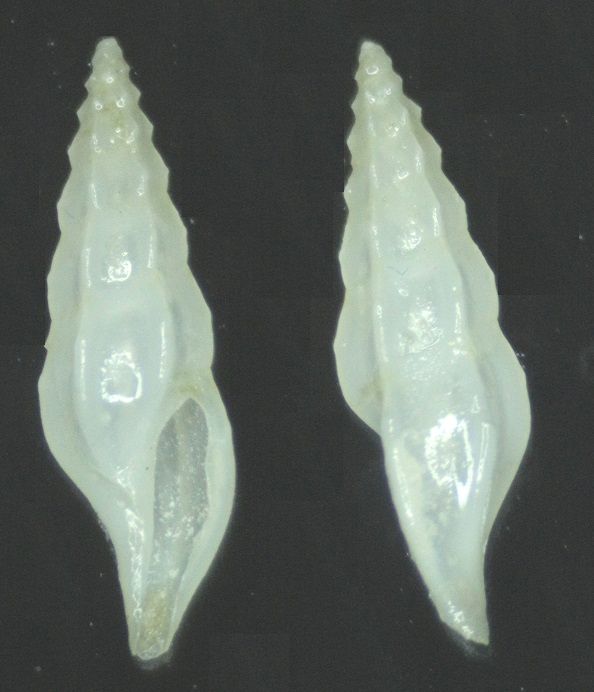
- Shell of Ithycythara lanceolata

Scientific classification
- Kingdom: Animalia
- Phylum: Mollusca
- Class: Gastropoda
- Subclass: Caenogastropoda
- Order: Neogastropoda
- Superfamily: Conoidea
- Family: Mangeliidae
- Genus: Ithycythara
- Species: I. lanceolata

Binomial name
- Ithycythara lanceolata (C. B. Adams, 1850)

Synonyms
- Ithycythara muricoides (C. B. Adams, 1850); Mangelia balteata Reeve, 1846 (original combination); Mangelia lanceolata Adams C. B., 1850; Mangelia muricoides C. B. Adams, 1850; Pyrgocythara balteata (Reeve, 1846)

= Ithycythara lanceolata =

Species of gastropod

Ithycythara lanceolata, common name the spear mangelia, is a species of sea snail, a marine gastropod mollusk in the family Mangeliidae.

== Description ==
The length of the shell varies between 4 mm and 20 mm.

(Original description) The shell is very long and has a lanceolate shape. It is brownish, more or less tinged with purple, with fine spiral lines of white and of dark brown, which are more conspicuous on the ribs; with a darker and wider brown line along the suture. The longitudinal sculpture consists of six very prominent acute transverse ribs on each whorl, which are nearly or quite continuous on the successive whorls. There is a spiral elevated line, on the middle of the whorls, which is obsolete in the intercostal spaces and has nodtdous intersections with the ribs. The protoconch is acute. The spire shows rectilinear outlines. The shell contains 8 whorls, scarcely convex, with a lightly impressed suture. The outer lip is finely denticulate within. The sinus is shallow. The siphonal canal is not very short.

== Distribution ==
I. lanceolata can be found in Atlantic waters, ranging from the eastern coast of Florida south to Brazil.; in the Caribbean Sea, the Gulf of Mexico and the Lesser Antilles.

== Habitat ==
Depth range based on 5 specimens in 1 taxon.

Water temperature and chemistry ranges based on 1 sample.

Environmental ranges

 Depth range (m): 2.75 – 18
 Temperature range (°C): 23.720 – 23.720
 Nitrate (umol/L): 0.501 – 0.501
 Salinity (PPS): 36.080 – 36.080
 Oxygen (mL/L): 4.807 – 4.807
 Phosphate (umol/L): 0.100 – 0.100
 Silicate (umol/L): 0.805 – 0.805[4]
