= Mandiana (gastropod) =

Scientific classification
- Kingdom: Animalia
- Phylum: Mollusca
- Class: Gastropoda
- Subclass: Caenogastropoda
- Order: Neogastropoda
- Superfamily: Conoidea
- Family: Mangeliidae
- Genus: Mandiana; Fallon, 2026

Type species
- Mandiana canaliculata Fallon & Bouchet, 2026 (type by original designation)

Species
- See text

Genus of gastropods

Mandiana is a genus of sea snails, marine gastropod mollusks in the family Mangeliidae.

== Species ==
- Mandiana canaliculata Fallon & Bouchet, 2026
- Mandiana vitrea Fallon & Bouchet, 2026
