= Psilocythara =

Scientific classification
- Kingdom: Animalia
- Phylum: Mollusca
- Class: Gastropoda
- Subclass: Caenogastropoda
- Order: Neogastropoda
- Superfamily: Conoidea
- Family: Mangeliidae
- Genus: Psilocythara; Fallon, 2026

Type species
- Psilocythara sucina Fallon & Bouchet, 2026 (type by original designation)

Species
- See text

Genus of gastropods

Psilocythara is a genus of sea snails, marine gastropod mollusks in the family Mangeliidae.

== Species ==
- Psilocythara barbarae (W. G. Lyons, 1972)
- Psilocythara multicincta (Rolán & Espinosa, 1999)
- Psilocythara roatanensis Fallon, 2026
- Psilocythara sucina Fallon & Bouchet, 2026
- Psilocythara versicolor Fallon & Bouchet, 2026
