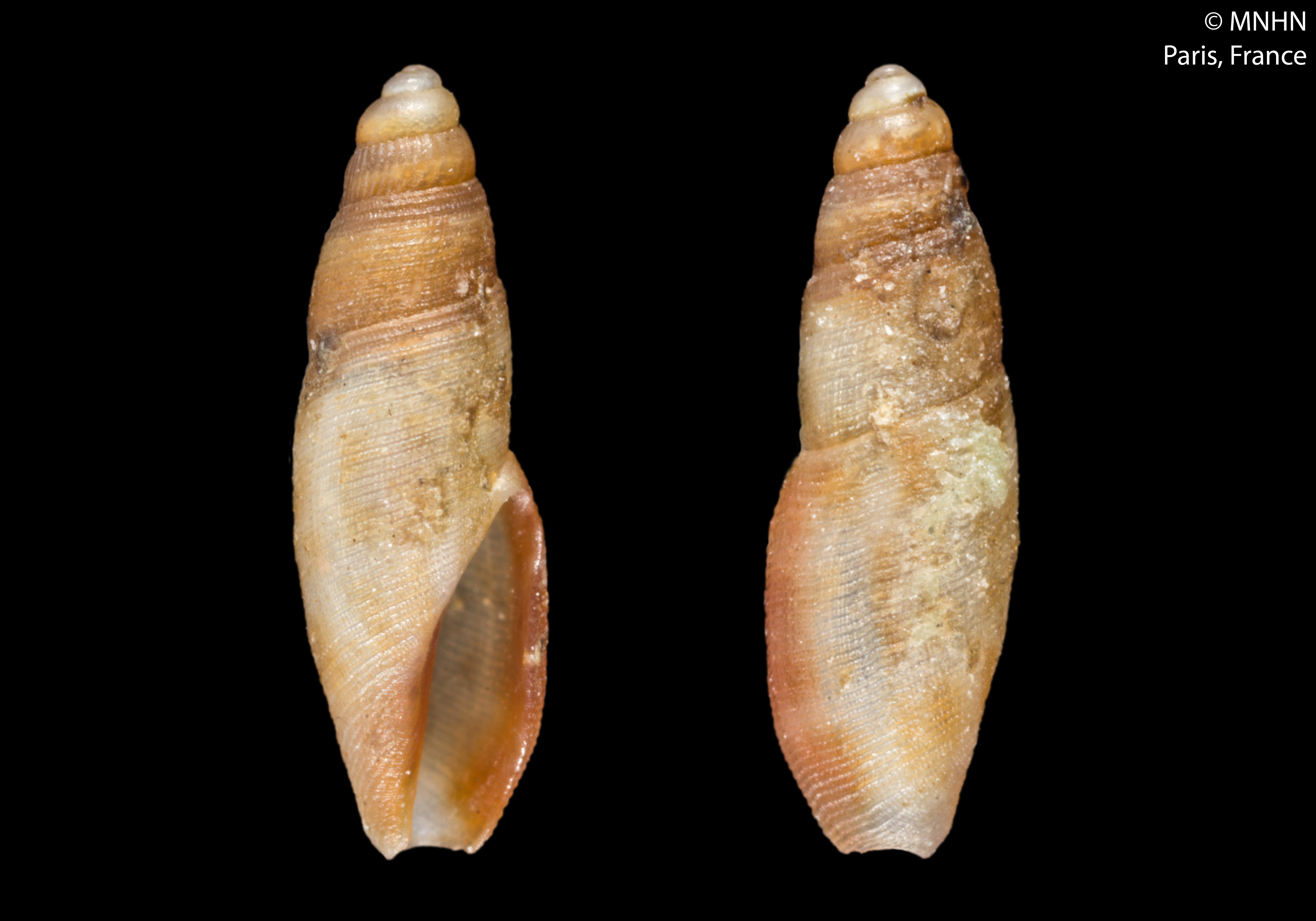
- PRESERVED_SPECIMEN; Philbertia marchadi Knudsen, 1956; Type status: HOLOTYPE; Identified by: N/A; Individual count: 1

Scientific classification
- Kingdom: Animalia
- Phylum: Mollusca
- Class: Gastropoda
- Subclass: Caenogastropoda
- Order: Neogastropoda
- Superfamily: Conoidea
- Family: Mangeliidae
- Genus: Kyllinia
- Species: K. marchadi

Binomial name
- Kyllinia marchadi (Knudsen, 1956)

Synonyms
- Diaugasma marchadi (Knudsen, 1956); Philbertia marchadi Knudsen, 1956 (original combination)

= Kyllinia marchadi =

Species of gastropod

Kyllinia marchadi is a species of sea snail, a marine gastropod mollusk in the family Mangeliidae.

== Description ==
The length of the shell attains 4.2 mm.

== Distribution ==
This marine species occurs in the Atlantic Ocean off Senegal, Guinea, and Angola.
