= Petrafixia =

Scientific classification
- Kingdom: Animalia
- Phylum: Mollusca
- Class: Gastropoda
- Subclass: Caenogastropoda
- Order: Neogastropoda
- Superfamily: Conoidea
- Family: Mangeliidae
- Genus: †Petrafixia; Cossmann, 1901

Type species
- † Fusus koeneni Cossmann & Lambert, 1884

Synonyms
- † Pyramimitra (Petrafixia) Cossmann, 1901

Genus of gastropods

Petrafixia is a genus of sea snails, marine gastropod mollusks in the family Mangeliidae.

== Species ==
- † Petrafixia annemariae (Lozouet, 2015) †
- † Petrafixia chattica Lozouet, 2017 †
- † Petrafixia koeneni (Cossmann & Lambert, 1884) †
