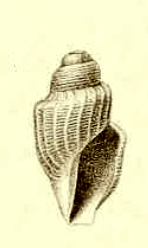
- Original image of a shell of Belalora striatula

Scientific classification
- Kingdom: Animalia
- Phylum: Mollusca
- Class: Gastropoda
- Subclass: Caenogastropoda
- Order: Neogastropoda
- Superfamily: Conoidea
- Family: Mangeliidae
- Genus: Belalora
- Species: B. striatula

Binomial name
- Belalora striatula (Thiele, 1912)

Synonyms
- Bela striatula Thiele, 1912; Oenopota striatula (Thiele, 1912)

= Belalora striatula =

Species of gastropod

Belalora striatula is a species of sea snail, a marine gastropod mollusk in the family Mangeliidae.

== Description ==
The length of the shell attains 5 mm. Belalora striatula is characterized by its slender morphology and distinctive wing patterns. The forewings display a series of striations or lines, which can vary in color, predominantly featuring shades of brown and grey, with lighter hues sometimes present. The hindwings are typically lighter and less patterned, contributing to the moth's overall camouflage. The antennae of this species are long and thread-like, a common trait among many moths in its family.

== Distribution ==
This marine species occurs off the South Shetland Islands and the Penguin Island, Antarctica, Antarctic Ocean
