= Vitjazinella multicostata =

Scientific classification
- Kingdom: Animalia
- Phylum: Mollusca
- Class: Gastropoda
- Subclass: Caenogastropoda
- Order: Neogastropoda
- Superfamily: Conoidea
- Family: Raphitomidae
- Genus: Vitjazinella
- Species: V. multicostata

Binomial name
- Vitjazinella multicostata Sysoev, 1988

Species of gastropod

Vitjazinella multicostata is a species of sea snail, a marine gastropod mollusk in the family Raphitomidae.

== Description ==
The length of the shell attains 7.2 mm.

== Distribution ==
This marine species was found in the Izu–Bonin Trench, Northwest Pacific.
