= Euryentmema =

Scientific classification
- Kingdom: Animalia
- Phylum: Mollusca
- Class: Gastropoda
- Subclass: Caenogastropoda
- Order: Neogastropoda
- Superfamily: Conoidea
- Family: Mangeliidae
- Genus: Euryentmema; W.P. Woodring, 1928

Type species
- † Euryentmema cigclis W.P. Woodring 1928

Species
- See text

Genus of gastropods

Euryentmema is a genus of sea snails, marine gastropod mollusks in the family Mangeliidae.

== Species ==
Species within the genus Euryentmema include:

- Euryentmema australiana T. Shuto, 1983
- † Euryentmema cigclis W.P. Woodring 1928
