= Belalora =

Scientific classification
- Kingdom: Animalia
- Phylum: Mollusca
- Class: Gastropoda
- Subclass: Caenogastropoda
- Order: Neogastropoda
- Superfamily: Conoidea
- Family: Mangeliidae
- Genus: Belalora; Powell, 1951

Type species
- Belalora thielei Powell, 1951

Species
- See text

Genus of gastropods

Belalora is a genus of sea snails, marine gastropod mollusks in the family Mangeliidae.

== Species ==
Species within the genus Belalora include:

- Belalora cunninghami (E. A. Smith, 1881)
- Belalora striatula (Thiele, 1912)
- Belalora weirichi(Engl, 2008)

Speciesq brought into synonymy

- Belalora thielei Powell, 1951: synonym of Oenopota cunninghami (Smith, E.A., 1881)
