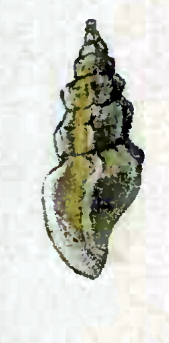
- Hemicythara angicostata

Scientific classification
- Kingdom: Animalia
- Phylum: Mollusca
- Class: Gastropoda
- Subclass: Caenogastropoda
- Order: Neogastropoda
- Superfamily: Conoidea
- Family: Mangeliidae
- Genus: Hemicythara; Kuroda & Oyama, 1971

Type species
- Pleurotoma octangulata Dunker, 1860

Species
- See text

= Hemicythara =

Genus of gastropods

Hemicythara is a genus of sea snails, marine gastropod mollusks in the family Mangeliidae.

== Species ==
According to the World Register of Marine Species (WoRMS) the following species with valid names are included within the genus Hemicythara :

- Hemicythara angicostata (Reeve, 1846)
- Hemicythara octangulata (Dunker, 1860)

Species brought into synonymy

- Hemicythara melanostoma A. Garrett, 1873: synonym of Hemicythara angicostata (L.A. Reeve, 1846)
- Hemicythara scalata S.M. Souverbie, 1874: synonym of Hemicythara angicostata (L.A. Reeve, 1846)
