= Toxicochlespira =

Scientific classification
- Kingdom: Animalia
- Phylum: Mollusca
- Class: Gastropoda
- Subclass: Caenogastropoda
- Order: Neogastropoda
- Superfamily: Conoidea
- Family: Mangeliidae
- Genus: Toxicochlespira; Sysoev & Kantor, 1990

Type species
- Toxicochlespira pagoda Sysoev & Kantor, 1990

Species
- See text

Genus of gastropods

Toxicochlespira is a genus of sea snails, marine gastropod mollusks in the family Mangeliidae.

== Species ==
Species within the genus Toxicochlespira include:

- Toxicochlespira pagoda Sysoev & Kantor, 1990
