= Paraspirotropis =

Scientific classification
- Kingdom: Animalia
- Phylum: Mollusca
- Class: Gastropoda
- Subclass: Caenogastropoda
- Order: Neogastropoda
- Superfamily: Conoidea
- Family: Mangeliidae
- Genus: Paraspirotropis; Sysoev & Kantor, 1984

Type species
- Pleurotomella simplicissima Dall, 1907

Species
- See text

Genus of gastropods

Paraspirotropis is a genus of sea snails, marine gastropod mollusks in the family Mangeliidae.

== Species ==
- Paraspirotropis simplicissima (Dall, 1907)
