= Vitjazinella =

Scientific classification
- Kingdom: Animalia
- Phylum: Mollusca
- Class: Gastropoda
- Subclass: Caenogastropoda
- Order: Neogastropoda
- Superfamily: Conoidea
- Family: Raphitomidae
- Genus: Vitjazinella; A. Sysoev, 1988

Type species
- Vitjazinella multicostata A. Sysoev, 1988

Species
- See text

Genus of molluscs

Vitjazinella is a genus of sea snails, marine gastropod mollusks in the family Raphitomidae.

== Species ==
- Vitjazinella multicostata Sysoev, 1988
