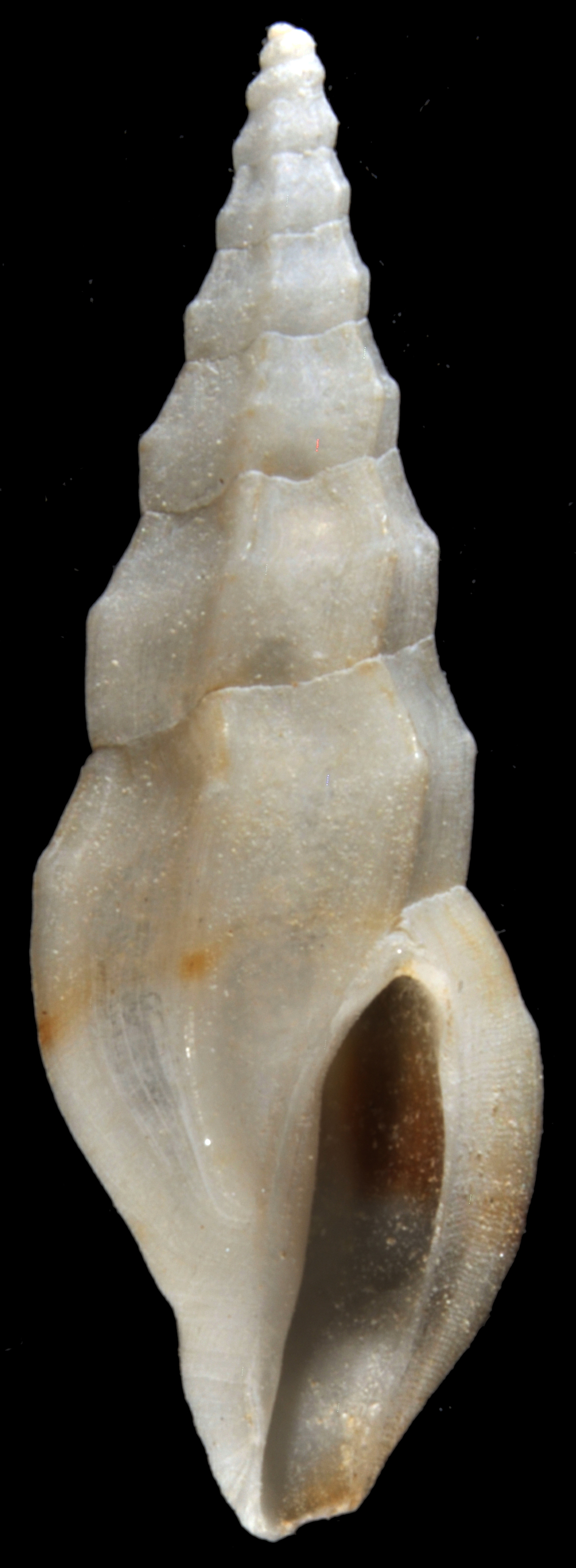
- Shell of Ithycythara altaspira (holotype at MNHN, Paris)

Scientific classification
- Kingdom: Animalia
- Phylum: Mollusca
- Class: Gastropoda
- Subclass: Caenogastropoda
- Order: Neogastropoda
- Superfamily: Conoidea
- Family: Mangeliidae
- Genus: Ithycythara; Woodring, 1928

Type species
- Mangelia psila Bush, 1885

Species
- See text

= Ithycythara =

Genus of gastropods

Ithycythara is a genus of small sea snails, marine gastropod mollusks in the family Mangeliidae.

== Description ==
The spiral sculpture is lacking or consists of microscopic striae. There may be a peripheral keel and a few basal threads.

This genus is closely related to Pseudorhaphitoma.

== Distribution ==
Species in this marine genus of seasnails occur in the Western Atlantic, the Caribbean Sea and the Gulf of Mexico.

== Species ==
Species within the genus Ithycythara include:

- Ithycythara acutangulus (Smith E. A., 1882)
- Ithycythara altaspira Paulmier, 2019
- Ithycythara antillensis Paulmier, 2019
- Ithycythara apicodenticulata Robba et al., 2003
- Ithycythara auberiana (d’Orbigny, 1847)
- Ithycythara chechoi Espinosa & Ortea, 2004
- Ithycythara cymella (Dall, 1889)
- Ithycythara eburnea Paulmier, 2019
- Ithycythara fasciata Paulmier, 2019
- Ithycythara funicostata Robba et al., 2006
- Ithycythara hyperlepta Haas, 1953
- Ithycythara lanceolata (C. B. Adams, 1850)
- Ithycythara oyuana (Yokoyama, 1922)
- Ithycythara parkeri Abbott, 1958
- Ithycythara penelope (Dall, 1919)
- Ithycythara pentagonalis (Reeve, 1845)
- Ithycythara psila (Bush, 1885)
- Ithycythara rubricata (Reeve, 1846)
- Ithycythara septemcostata (Schepman, 1913)

Species brought into synonymy

- Ithycythara edithae Nowell-Usticke, 1971: synonym of Cryoturris edithae (Nowell-Usticke, 1971)
- † Ithycythara kellumi Fargo, W. G., 1953: synonym of Ithycythara psila (Bush, 1885)
- Ithycythara muricoides (C. B. Adams, 1850): synonym of Ithycythara lanceolata (C. B. Adams, 1850)

Extinct species

- † Ithycythara defuniak Gardner 1938
- † Ithycythara elongata Gabb 1873
- † Ithycythara ischna Woodring 1928
- Ithycythara lanceolata Adams 1850 (Recent and fossil)
- † Ithycythara maera Woodring 1928
- Ithycythara psila Bush 1885 (Recent and fossil)
- † Ithycythara psiloides Woodring 1928
- † Ithycythara scissa Woodring 1928
- † Ithycythara tarri Maury 1910
