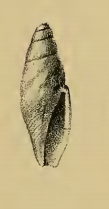
- Original image of a shell of Diaugasma epicharta

Scientific classification
- Kingdom: Animalia
- Phylum: Mollusca
- Class: Gastropoda
- Subclass: Caenogastropoda
- Order: Neogastropoda
- Superfamily: Conoidea
- Family: Raphitomidae
- Genus: Diaugasma
- Species: D. epicharta

Binomial name
- Diaugasma epicharta (Melvill & Standen, 1903)

Synonyms
- Daphnella epicharta Melvill & Standen, 1903 (original combination)

= Diaugasma epicharta =

Species of gastropod

Diaugasma epicharta is a species of sea snail, a marine gastropod mollusk in the family Raphitomidae.

== Description ==
The length of the shell attains 5 mm, and its diameter 1.75 mm.

The small oblong-fusiform shell is semi-pellucid. It is unicolorous white, or flecked with pale straw-colored spots. It contains six whorls of which three in the protoconch. These are closely and very finely cancellate. The subsequent whorls are slightly ventricose and almost smooth. The very delicate and irregular spiral striation across the whorls is almost evanescent. The body whorl is smooth centrally. The narrow aperture is oblong. The outer lip is nearly straight. It is incrassate, white and shining. The columella stands upright. The siphonal canal is short. The sinus is hardly expressed.

== Distribution ==
This marine species occurs in the Gulf of Oman
