= Pleurotomella bathybia =

Scientific classification
- Kingdom: Animalia
- Phylum: Mollusca
- Class: Gastropoda
- Subclass: Caenogastropoda
- Order: Neogastropoda
- Superfamily: Conoidea
- Family: Raphitomidae
- Genus: Pleurotomella
- Species: P. bathybia

Binomial name
- Pleurotomella bathybia Strebel, 1908

Synonyms
- Lorabela bathybia (Strebel, 1908); Pleurotomella (Anomalotomella) bathybia Strebel, 1908· accepted, alternate representation

Species of gastropod

Pleurotomella bathybia is a species of sea snail, a marine gastropod mollusk in the family Raphitomidae.

== Description ==
The length of the shell attains 6.5 mm.

== Distribution ==
This marine species occurs off South Georgia Island & South Sandwich Islands at depths between 94 m - 310 m.
