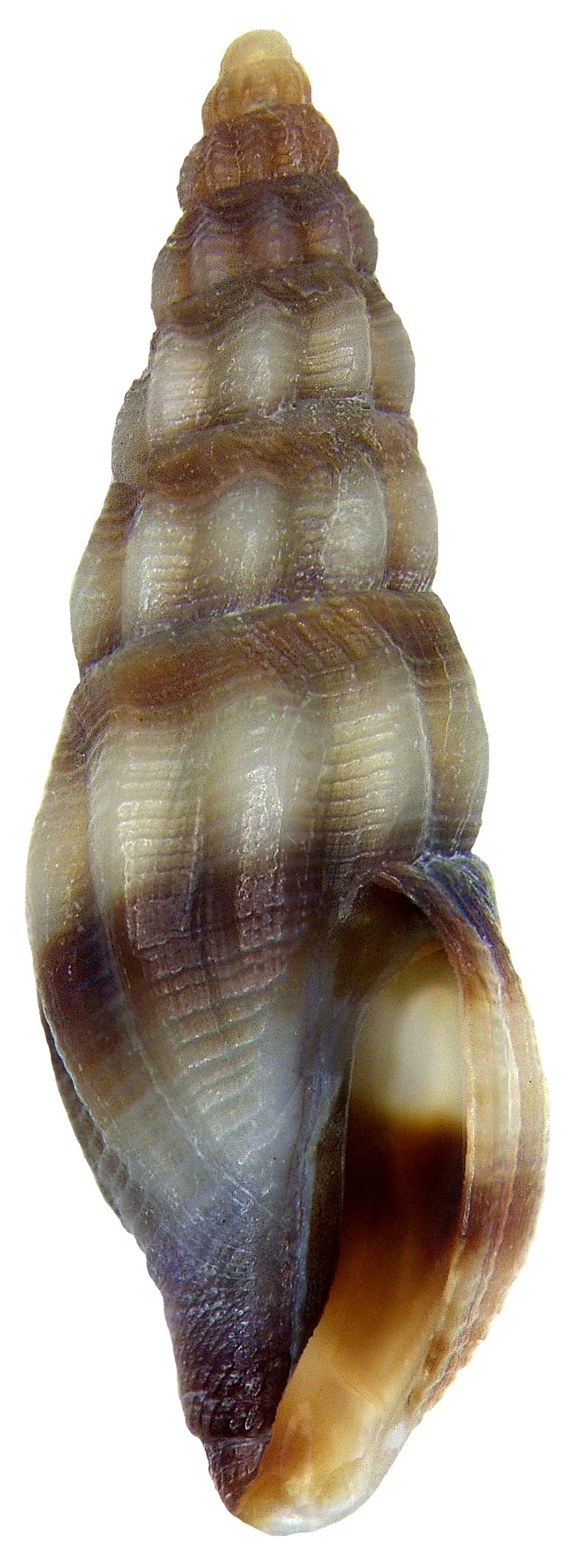
- Apertural view of the mangeliid Bela zonata

Scientific classification
- Kingdom: Animalia
- Phylum: Mollusca
- Class: Gastropoda
- Subclass: Caenogastropoda
- Order: Neogastropoda
- Superfamily: Conoidea
- Family: Mangeliidae; P. Fischer, 1883

Genera
- See text

Synonyms
- Cytharinae Thiele, 1929; Mangeliinae P. Fischer, 1883; Oenopotinae Bogdanov, 1987

= Mangeliidae =

Family of gastropods

Mangeliidae is a monophyletic family of small to medium-sized, predatory sea snails, marine gastropod mollusks in the superfamily Conoidea.

Prior to 2011, both the subfamilies Mangeliinae and Oenopotinae had been placed in the family Conidae. In 2011, Bouchet, Kantor et al merged the two subfamilies into one taxon, which they elevated to the rank of family. This was based on anatomical characters and a dataset of molecular sequences of three gene fragments.

Mangeliidae is a sister-clade to the family Raphitomidae

As with their relatives in the family Conidae, species in the family Mangeliidae use potent venoms to catch their prey. Through this characteristic, they are of interest in pharmacological research.

== Description ==
This family is characterized in general by usually the lack of an operculum, by a deep anal sinus on the subsutural ramp and with a heavy callus on the shoulder slope of the outer lip.

The Mangeliidae are small to medium-sized gastropods (length usually smaller than 30 mm). The high-spired shell has a fusiform to an oval or biconical shape. The protoconch is helicoid, with a very small initial, and rapidly increasing subsequent whorls. The spire is usually comparatively low. The shoulders of the whorls are often angular. The axial ribs are dominant in the sculpture of the shell. The spiral sculpture often consists of fine striae with a microsculpture of spirally aligned granules (especially on the subsutural ramp). The texture of the adult shell is frequently "gritty," from a sculpture of minute grains. The aperture is oval-elongated, usually narrow, terminating in a rather short, truncated siphonal canal. The aperture is only rarely denticulate. The outer lip (labrum) is reinforced. The varix is usually well developed, and the fasciole evanescent. A series of pustules on the columella is an ordinary feature. The toxoglossate radula has a weak basal ribbon and relatively short marginal teeth with very variable morphology (from semi-enrolled to true hypodermic). The tooth cavity opens laterally.

However, the genera Neoguraleus and Liracraea are operculate; the operculum in these genera has a terminal nucleus. These exceptions mean that the reinforced outer lip is the most characteristic feature of this family.

The species in this family occurred from the Paleogene to Recent.

== Genera ==
This is a list of the accepted names of genera in the family Mangeliidae (the main reference for Holocene species is the World Register of Marine Species):

- Acmaturris Woodring, 1928
- Adelocythara Woodring, 1928
- Agathotoma Cossman, 1899
- † Amblyacrum Cossmann, 1889
- Anticlinura Thiele, 1934
- Antiguraleus Powell, 1942
- Apispiralia Laseron, 1954
- Apitua Laseron, 1954
- Austrobela Criscione, Hallan, Puillandre & Fedosov, 2020
- Bactrocythara Woodring, 1928
- Bathyturris Fallon, 2026
- Bela Gray, 1847
- Belalora Powell, 1951
- † Belidaphne Vera-Peláez, 2002
- Bellacythara McLean, 1971
- Benthomangelia Thiele, 1925
- Brachycythara Woodring, 1928
- † Buchozia Bayan, 1873
- Cacodaphnella Pilsbry & Lowe, 1933
- Citharomangelia Kilburn, 1992
- Cryoturris Woodring, 1928
- Curtitoma Bartsch, 1941
- Cythara Fischer, 1883 (nomen dubium)
- Cytharopsis A. Adams, 1865
- Eucithara Fischer, 1883
- Euryentmema Woodring, 1928
- Genotina Vera-Peláez, 2004
- Gingicithara Kilburn, 1992
- Glyphoturris Woodring, 1928
- Granotoma Bartsch, 1941
- Granoturris Fargo, 1953
- Guraleus Hedley, 1918
- Hemicythara Kuroda & Oyama, 1971
- Heterocithara Hedley, 1922
- Ithycythara Woodring, 1928
- Kurtzia Bartsch 1944
- Kurtziella Dall, 1918
- Kurtzina Bartsch, 1944
- Kyllinia Garilli & Galletti, 2007
- Leiocithara Hedley, 1922
- Liracraea Odhner, 1924
- Lorabela Powell, 1951
- Macteola Hedley, 1918
- Mandiana Fallon, 2026
- Mangelia Risso, 1826
- Marita Hedley, 1922
- Mitraguraleus Laseron, 1954
- Neoguraleus Powell, 1939
- Notocytharella Hertlein & Strong, 1955
- Obesotoma Bartsch, 1941
- Oenopota Mörch, 1852
- Oenopotella A. Sysoev, 1988
- Papillocithara Kilburn, 1992
- Paraguraleus Powell, 1944
- Paraspirotropis Sysoev & Kantor, 1984
- Perimangelia McLean, 2000
- † Petrafixia Cossmann, 1901
- Platycythara Woodring, 1928
- Propebela Iredale, 1918
- Pseudorhaphitoma Boettger, 1895
- Psilocythara Fallon, 2026
- Pyrgocythara Woodring, 1928
- Rhomboturris Fallon, 2026
- Rubellatoma Bartsch & Rehder, 1939
- Saccharoturris Woodring, 1928
- Sorgenfreispira Moroni, 1979
- Stellatoma Bartsch & Rehder, 1939
- Suturocythara Garcia, 2008
- Tenaturris Woodring, 1928
- Toxicochlespira Sysoev & Kantor, 1990
- Venustoma Bartsch, 1941
- Vexiguraleus Powell, 1942
- Vitricythara Fargo, 1953

Genera moved to other families

- Anacithara Hedley, 1922 : brought into the new family Horaiclavidae
- Austropusilla Laseron, 1954: brought into the new family Raphitomidae
- Belaturricula Powell, 1951 : brought into the new family Borsoniidae
- Clathromangelia Monterosato, 1884 : brought into the new family Clathurellidae
- Conopleura Hinds, 1844 : belongs to Drilliidae
- Euclathurella Woodring, 1928 : belongs to the new family Clathurellidae
- Glyptaesopus Pilsbry & Olsson, 1941: brought into the new family Borsoniidae
- Lienardia Jousseaume, 1884 : brought into the new family Clathurellidae
- Lioglyphostomella Shuto, 1970 : brought into the new family Pseudomelatomidae
- Otitoma Jousseaume, 1898 : belongs to the new family Pseudomelatomidae
- Paraclathurella Boettger, 1895 : belongs to the new family Clathurellidae
- Paramontana Laseron, 1954 : belongs to the new family Raphitomidae
- Pseudoetrema Oyama, 1953 : belongs to the new family Clathurellidae
- Psilocythara Fallon, 2026
- Thelecythara Woodring, 1928 : belongs to the new family Horaiclavidae
- Turrella Laseron, 1954 : belongs to the new family Clathurellidae
- Vitjazinella Sysoev 1988 : belongs to the Raphitomidae

Genera brought into synonymy

- Canetoma Bartsch, 1941: synonym of Propebela Iredale, 1918
- Cestoma Bartsch, 1941: synonym of Propebela Iredale, 1918
- Cithara: synonym of Cythara Schumacher, 1817
- Clathromangilia: synonym of Clathromangelia Monterosato, 1884: belongs now to the family Clathurellidae
- Clinuromella Beets, 1943: synonym of Anticlinura Thiele, 1934
- Clinuropsis Thiele, 1929: synonym of Anticlinura Thiele, 1934
- Cyrtocythara F. Nordsieck, 1977: synonym of Mangelia Risso, 1826
- Cytharella Monterosato, 1875: synonym of Mangelia (Cytharella) Monterosato, 1875
- Ditoma Bellardi, 1875: synonym of Agathotoma Cossman, 1899
- Euguraleus Cotton, 1947: synonym of Guraleus Hedley, 1918
- Fehria van Aartsen, 1988 : synonym of Bela Gray, 1847
- Funitoma Bartsch, 1941: synonym of Propebela Iredale, 1918
- Ginnania Monterosato, 1884: synonym of Bela Gray, 1847
- Lora Auctores non Gray, 1847: synonym of Oenopota Mörch, 1852
- Mangilia Lovén, 1846: synonym of Mangelia Risso, 1826
- Mangiliella Bucquoy, Dautzenberg & Dollfus, 1883 : synonym of Mangelia Risso, 1826
- Nematoma Bartsch, 1941: synonym of Curtitoma Bartsch, 1941
- Nodotoma Bartsch, 1941: synonym of Oenopota Mörch, 1852
- Pseudoraphitoma: synonym of Pseudorhaphitoma Boettger, 1895
- Rissomangelia Monterosato, 1917 : synonym of Mangelia Risso, 1826
- Rugocythara Nordsieck, 1977 : synonym of Mangelia Risso, 1826
- Scabrella Hedley, 1918: synonym of Asperdaphne Hedley, 1922
- Smithia Monterosato, 1884: synonym of Smithiella Monterosato, 1890
- Smithiella Monterosato, 1890 : synonym of Mangelia Risso, 1826
- Thelecytharella Shuto, 1969 : synonym of Otitoma Jousseaume, 1898 : belongs to the family Pseudomelatomidae
- Thetidos Hedley, 1899: synonym of Lienardia Jousseaume, 1884 : belongs to the family Clathurellidae
- Turritomella Bartsch, 1941: synonym of Propebela Iredale, 1918
- Villiersiella Monterosato, 1890: synonym of Mangelia Risso, 1826
- Widalli Bogdanov, 1986: synonym of Curtitoma Bartsch, 1941
- Cythara Schumacher, 1817 (nomen dubium)
