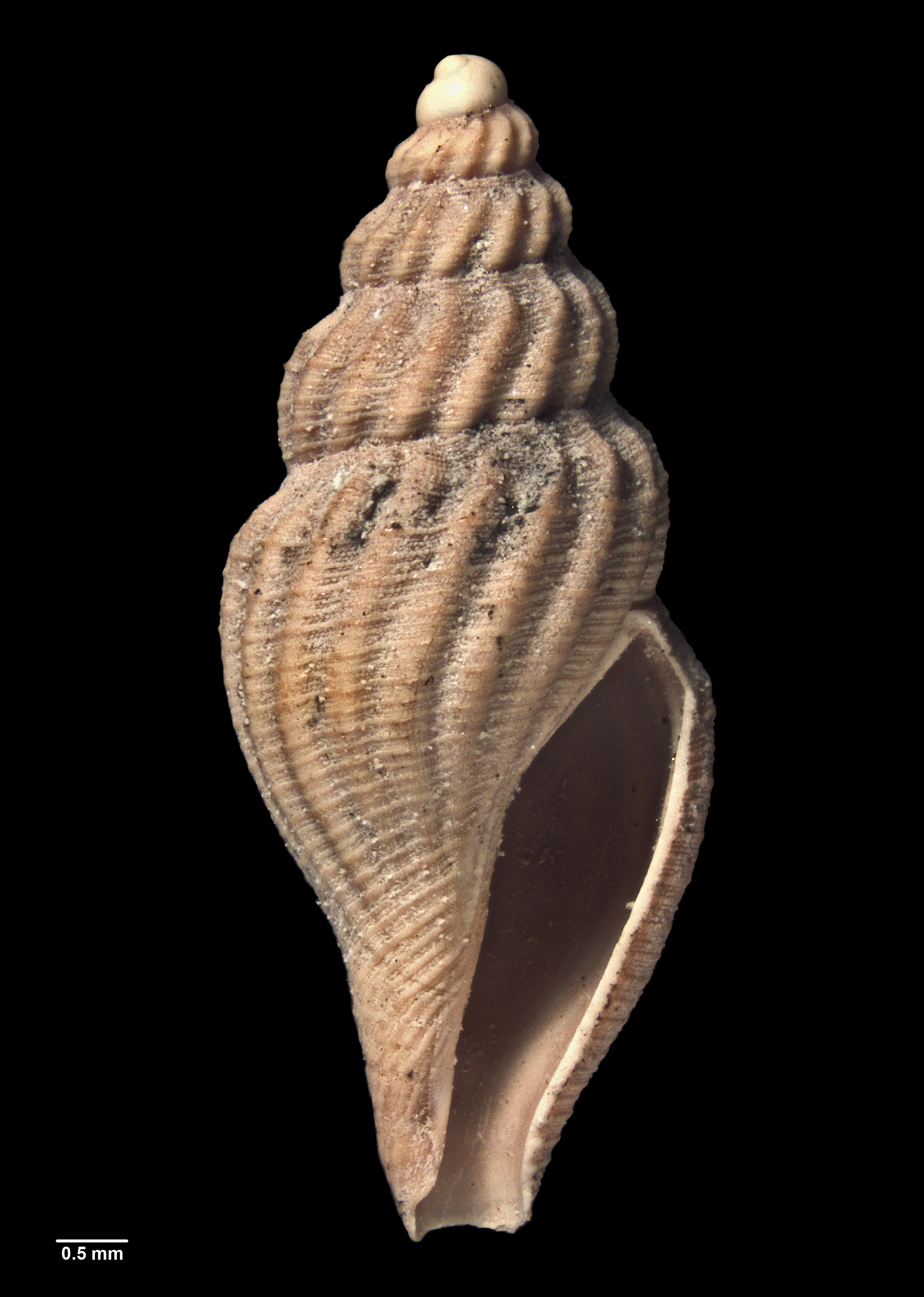
- Holotype of Paraguraleus balcombensis

Scientific classification
- Kingdom: Animalia
- Phylum: Mollusca
- Class: Gastropoda
- Subclass: Caenogastropoda
- Order: Neogastropoda
- Family: Mangeliidae
- Genus: Paraguraleus; Powell, 1944

Type species
- † Guraleus balcombensis Powell, 1944

Synonyms
- Guraleus (Paraguraleus) Powell, 1944

= Paraguraleus =

Paraguraleus Temporal range: early Oligocene–0

Genus of gastropods

Paraguraleus is a genus of minute gastropod molluscs in the family Mangeliidae. First described by A. W. B. Powell in 1944, the genus includes both extant species and fossil species dating back to the early Oligocene. Both extant and fossil species have only been found in Australia.

== Description ==
In the original description, Powell described the genus as below:

[Paraguraleus is] identical with Guraleus in adult facies, but with a very different protoconch, which is paucispiral of two globose whorls, assymmetrically wound, with a small tip and terminated by several closely spaced, thin, sinuous brephic axtals...Paraguraleus has a more definite sinus than Antiguraleus, the anterior end is not marked off in sculpture and the protoconch is more distinctly of two globose whorls. That of Antiguraleus is asymmetric, the tip adpressed, not well marked, but thence suddenly and rapidly becoming inflated, bulging more on one side.

== Taxonomy ==
Paraguraleus was first described by A. W. B. Powell in 1944 as a subgenus, naming Guraleus balcombensis the type species. It was raised to genus status by as early as 1954. Powell synonymised the genus with Antiguraleus in 1966. Alan Beu synoynymised both Antiguraleus and Paraguraleus with the genus Propebela in 2011. This synonymisation is accepted by the Australian Faunal Directory, but not by the World Register of Marine Species.

== Distribution ==
Paraguraleus fossils date from the early Oligocene and the Miocene, and are found in the Otway Basin, Port Phillip Basin, St Vincent Basin and Eucla Basin of Australia. Living taxa are endemic to Australia.

== Species ==
Species within the genus Paraguraleus include:

- † Paraguraleus abbreviatus A. W. B. Powell, 1944
- † Paraguraleus balcombensis A. W. B. Powell, 1944
- Paraguraleus emina (Hedley, 1905)
- † Paraguraleus finlayi A. W. B. Powell, 1944
- † Paraguraleus incisus A. W. B. Powell, 1944
- Paraguraleus lucidus Laseron, 1954
- † Paraguraleus obsoletus (G. F. Harris, 1897)

Species brought into synonymy

- Paraguraleus alternatus Laseron, 1954: synonym of Antiguraleus alternatus (Laseron, 1954)
- Paraguraleus costatus (Hedley, 1922): synonym of Antiguraleus costatus (Hedley, 1922)
- Paraguraleus howelli Laseron, 1954: synonym of Antiguraleus howelli (Laseron, 1954)
- Paraguraleus permutatus (Hedley, 1922): synonym of Antiguraleus permutatus (Hedley, 1922)
- Paraguraleus serpentis Laseron, 1954: synonym of Antiguraleus serpentis (Laseron, 1954)
- Paraguraleus subitus Laseron, 1954: synonym of Antiguraleus subitus (Laseron, 1954)
- Paraguraleus tepidus Laseron, 1954: synonym of Antiguraleus tepidus (Laseron, 1954)

== Gallery ==
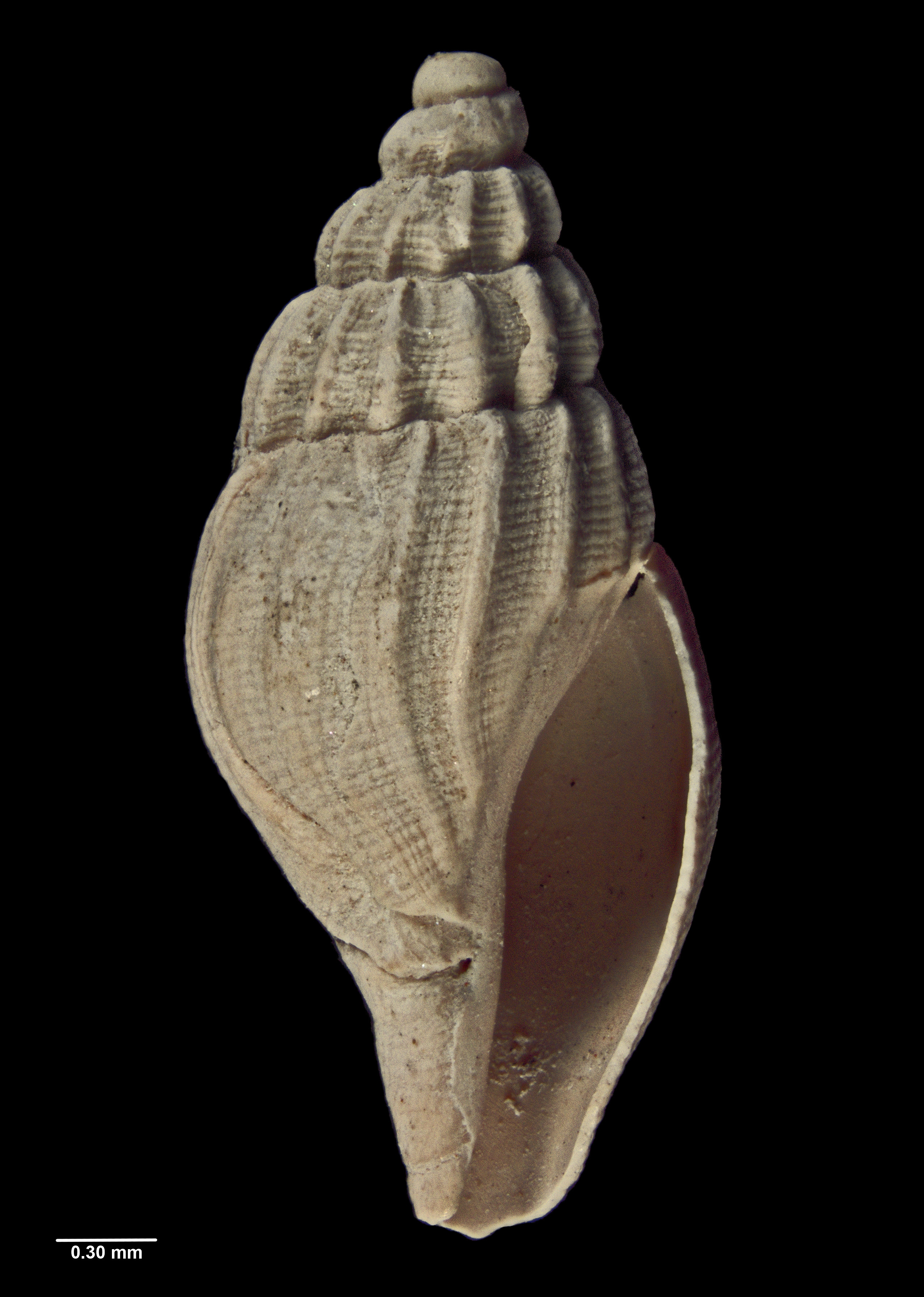
Paraguraleus abbreviatus

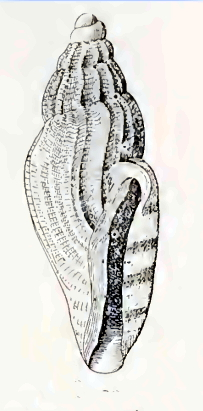
Paraguraleus emina

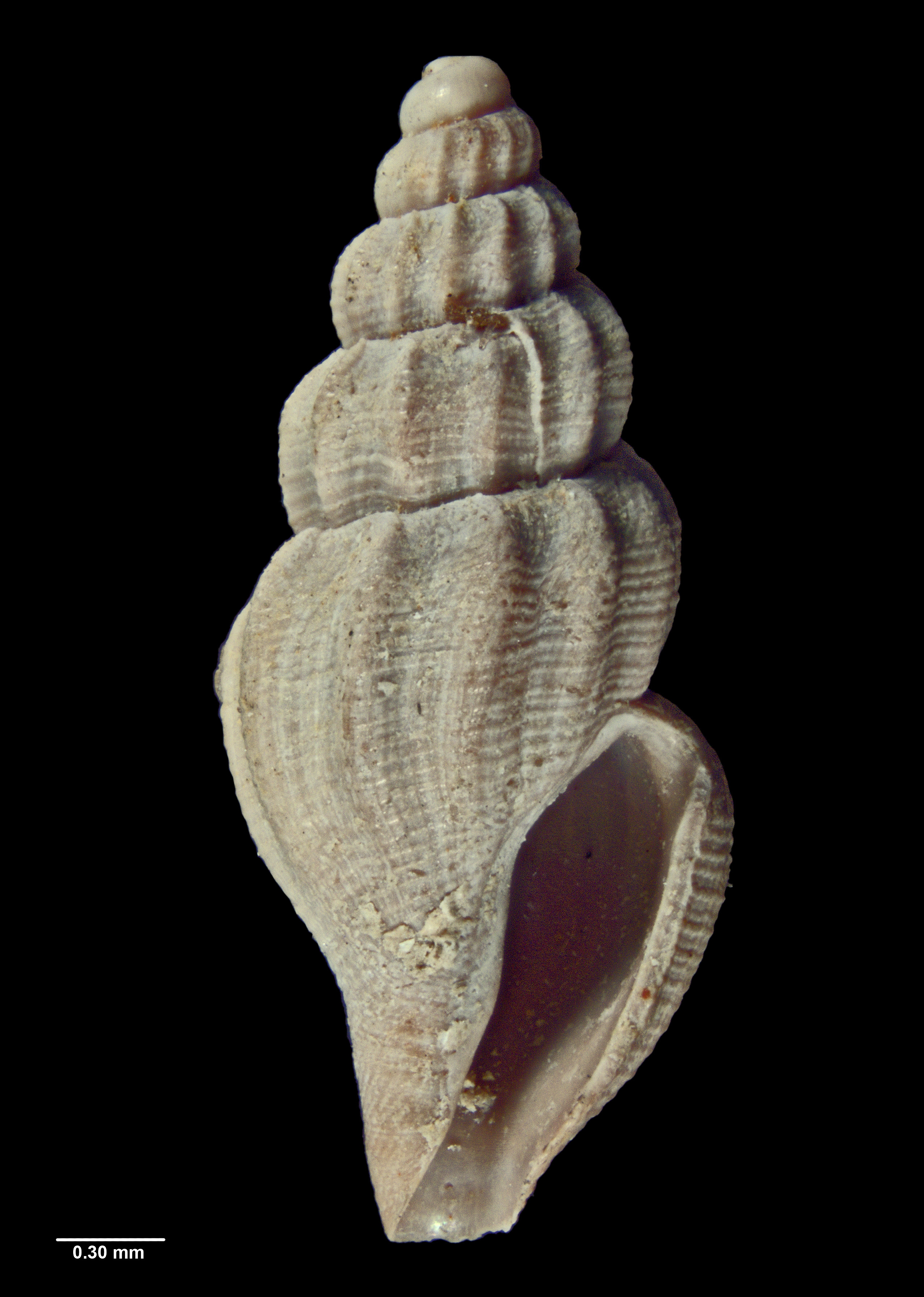
Paraguraleus finlayi

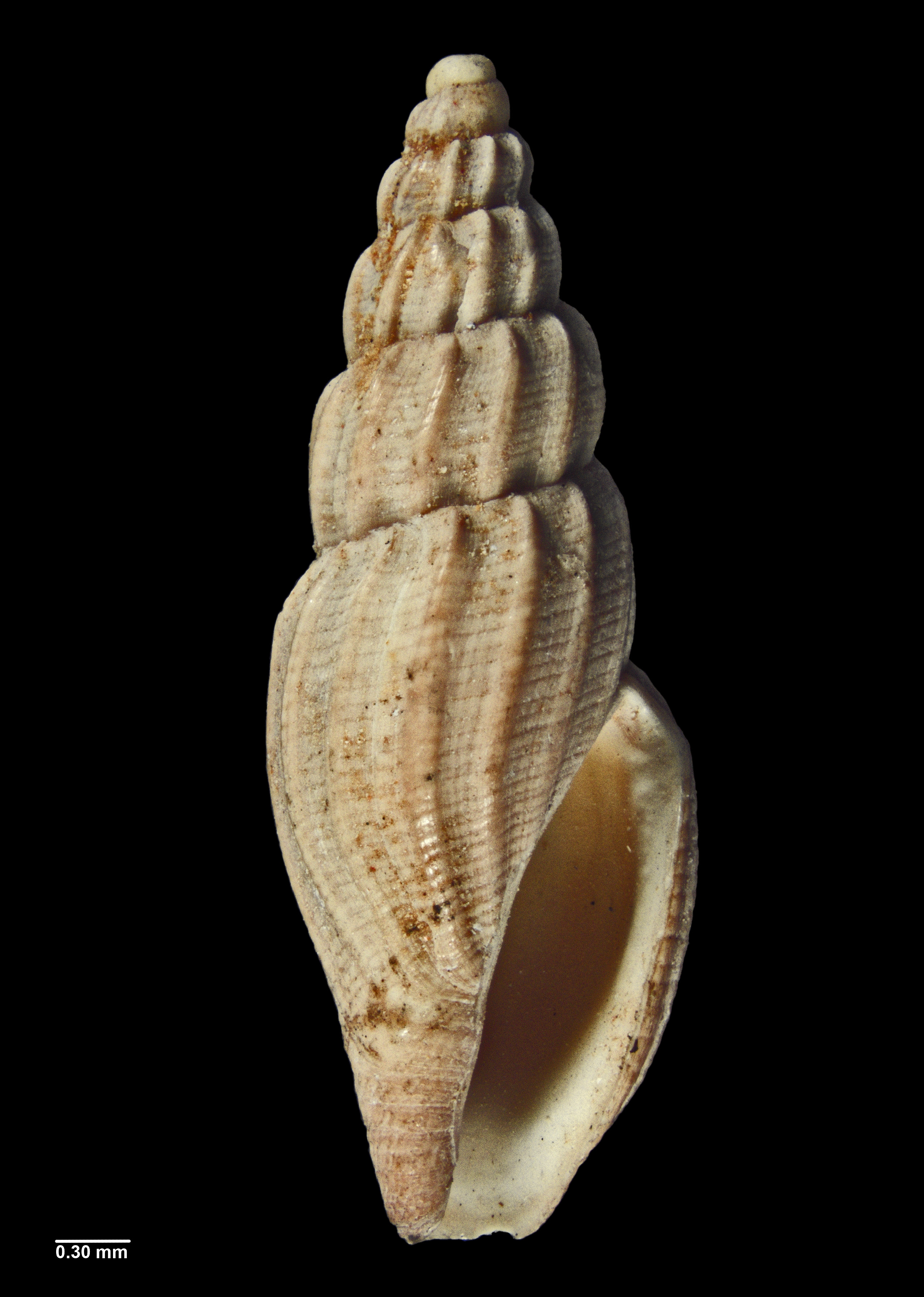
Paraguraleus incisus
