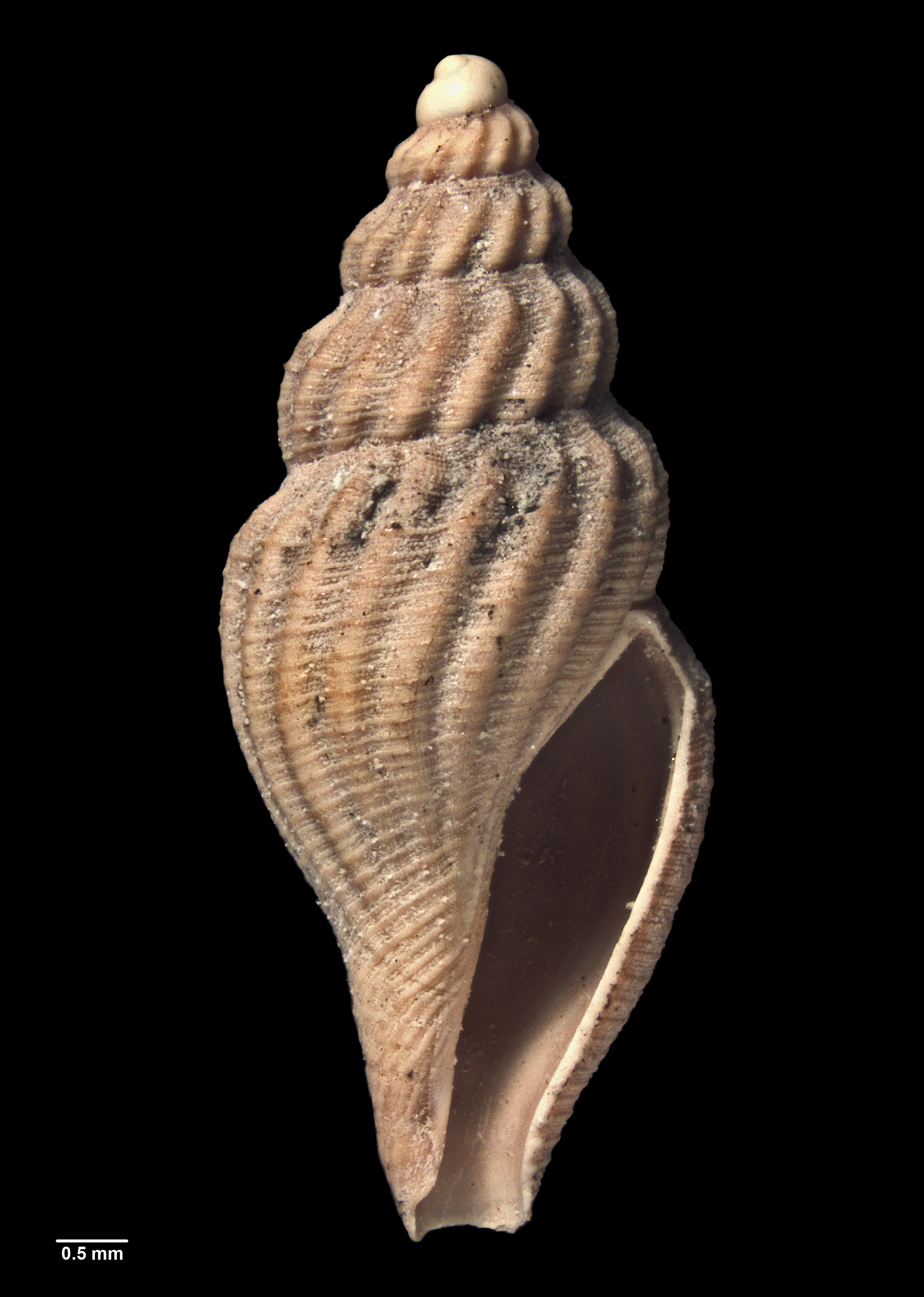
- Holotype from Auckland War Memorial Museum

Scientific classification
- Kingdom: Animalia
- Phylum: Mollusca
- Class: Gastropoda
- Subclass: Caenogastropoda
- Order: Neogastropoda
- Family: Mangeliidae
- Genus: Paraguraleus
- Species: †P. balcombensis

Binomial name
- †Paraguraleus balcombensis (Powell, 1944)

Synonyms
- † Antiguraleus balcombensis (A.W.B. Powell, 1944); † Guraleus (Paraguraleus) balcombensis A.W.B. Powell, 1944; † Guraleus balcombensis A.W.B. Powell, 1944; † Propebela balcombensis (A.W.B. Powell, 1944)

= Paraguraleus balcombensis =

Paraguraleus balcombensis Temporal range: Middle Miocene

Extinct species of gastropod

Paraguraleus balcombensis is an extinct species of sea snail, a marine gastropod mollusc in the family Mangeliidae. Fossils of the species date to the Middle Miocene, and have been found in strata of the Port Phillip Basin of Victoria, Australia.

== Description ==
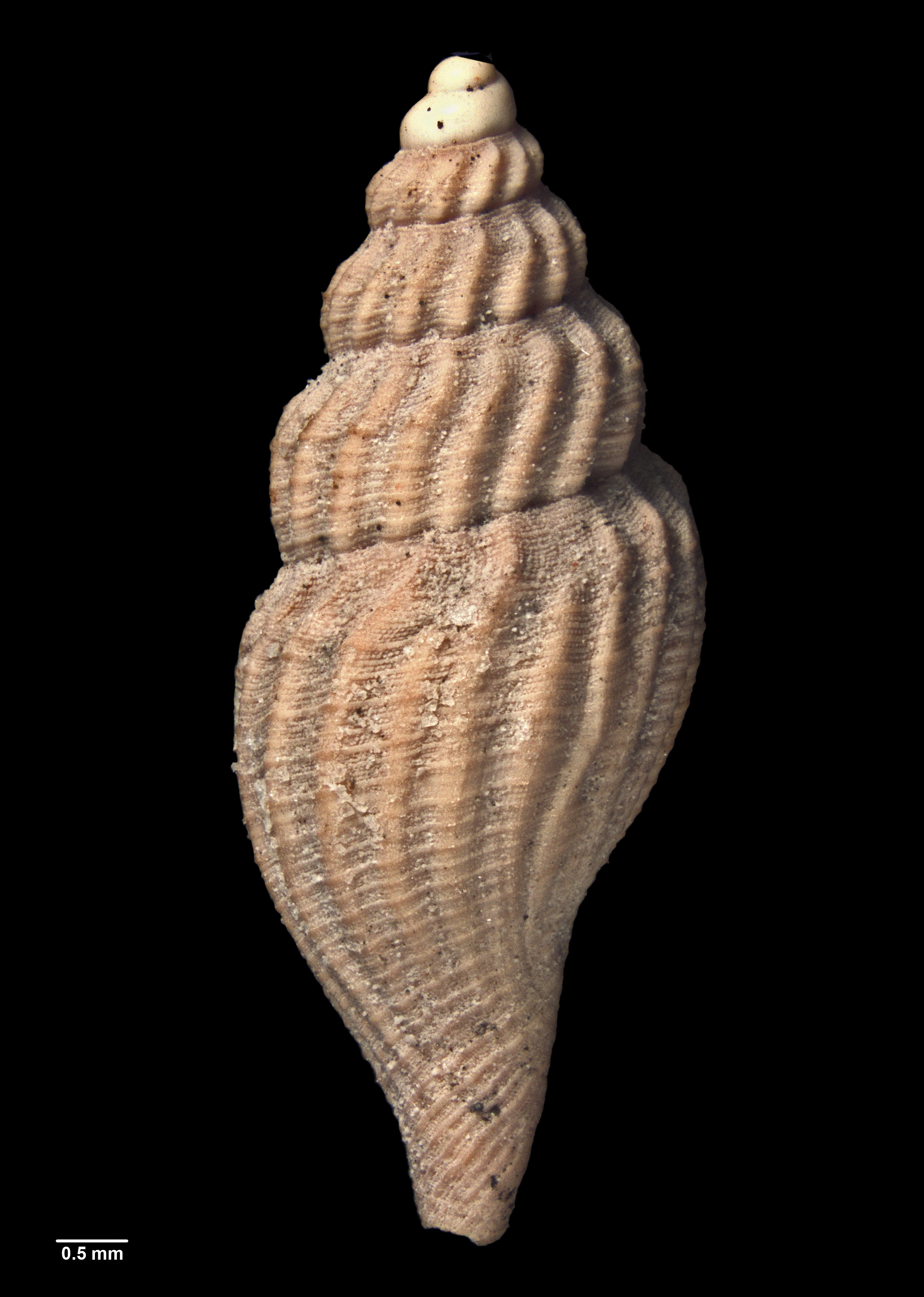
Reverse view of holotype

In the original description, Powell described the species as follows:

Ovate-fusiform. Whorls strongly convex, weakly shouldered above the middle. Sculptured with rounded, closely spaced, flexuous axials, 16 per whorl, extending from upper suture over base to the neck; crossed by narrow spiral cords and fine interstitial lirations. Spire-whorls with about 12 lirations on the shoulder, 4 primary cords on the penultimate, and three lirations in each interspace, the middle one of the three slightly stronger. There are about 12 primary cords on the body whorl and many intermediates. Aperture as in finlayi.

The holotype of the species measures 8.5 mm (0.33 in) in height and 3.4 mm (0.13 in) in diameter.

== Taxonomy ==
The species was first described by A.W.B. Powell in 1944, as the type species of Paraguraleus, then a subgenus of Guraleus. Originally known as Guraleus (Paraguraleus) balcombensis, the species was moved to the genus Antiguraleus in 1970 by Thomas A. Darragh, This recombination is not supported by the World Register of Marine Species, which gives the accepted name of the species as Paraguraleus balcombensis. The holotype was collected from Fossil Beach, Balcombe Bay / Jullul Bay, Victoria, Australia, at an unknown date earlier than 1944, and is held by the Auckland War Memorial Museum.

== Distribution ==
This extinct marine species occurs in middle Miocene strata of the Port Phillip Basin, including the Gellibrand Formation of Balcombe Bay, Victoria.
