= A. aeneus =

A. aeneus may refer to:

- Abacetus aeneus, a ground beetle found in Egypt and Cyprus
- Aneides aeneus, the green salamander, found in the United States
- Anolis aeneus, the bronze anole, a lizard found in the Caribbean and South America
- Antiguraleus aeneus, an Australian sea snail
- Ariodes aeneus, a synonym of Netuma thalassina, the giant catfish
- Aspergillus aeneus, a fungus
- Astyanax aeneus, the banded tetra, a fish found in Central and South America
- Autocrates aeneus, an Asian beetle
