= Mangelia munda =

Scientific classification
- Kingdom: Animalia
- Phylum: Mollusca
- Class: Gastropoda
- Subclass: Caenogastropoda
- Order: Neogastropoda
- Superfamily: Conoidea
- Family: Mangeliidae
- Genus: Mangelia
- Species: M. munda

Binomial name
- Mangelia munda (E.A. Smith, 1888)

Synonyms
- Pleurotoma (Clathurella) munda E.A. Smith, 1888

Species of gastropod

Mangelia munda is a species of sea snail, a marine gastropod mollusk in the family Mangeliidae.

This species is not to be confused with Mangilia munda Suter, 1909 (synonym of Antiguraleus mundus (Suter, 1909))

== Description ==
The length of the shell attains 4.5 mm, its diameter 1.7 mm.

The white shell has a narrow-ovate shape. It contains 7 whorls of which 2 smooth and convex whorls in the protoconch. This species is especially remarkable for the fine yet very prominent thread-like lirations encircling the whorls. The longitudinal ribs are stout, rounded, and equalling in width the interstices between them. The aperture is narrow and measures about a third of the total length of the shell. The outer lip is incrassate. The truncated siphonal canal is very short.

== Distribution ==
The marine species occurs in the Persian Gulf and in the China Sea.
