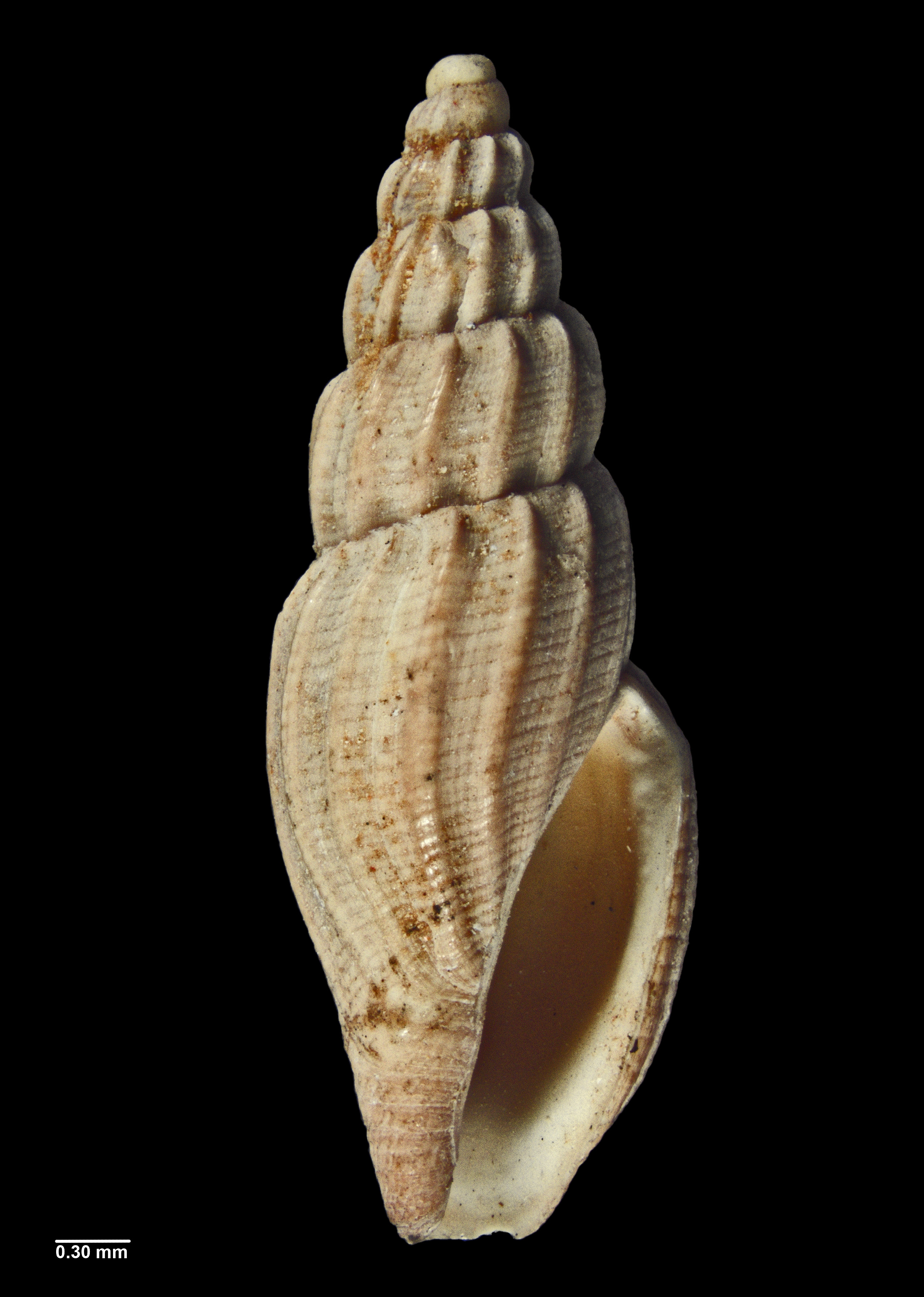
- Holotype from Auckland War Memorial Museum

Scientific classification
- Kingdom: Animalia
- Phylum: Mollusca
- Class: Gastropoda
- Subclass: Caenogastropoda
- Order: Neogastropoda
- Family: Mangeliidae
- Genus: Paraguraleus
- Species: †P. incisus

Binomial name
- †Paraguraleus incisus (Powell, 1944)

Synonyms
- † Antiguraleus incisus (A.W.B. Powell, 1944); † Guraleus (Paraguraleus) incisus A.W.B. Powell, 1944; † Guraleus incisus A.W.B. Powell, 1944; † Propebela incisus (A.W.B. Powell, 1944)

= Paraguraleus incisus =

Paraguraleus incisus Temporal range: Middle Miocene

Extinct species of gastropod

Paraguraleus incisus is an extinct species of sea snail, a marine gastropod mollusc in the family Mangeliidae. Fossils of the species date to the middle Miocene, and have been found in strata of the St Vincent Basin of South Australia, Australia.

== Description ==
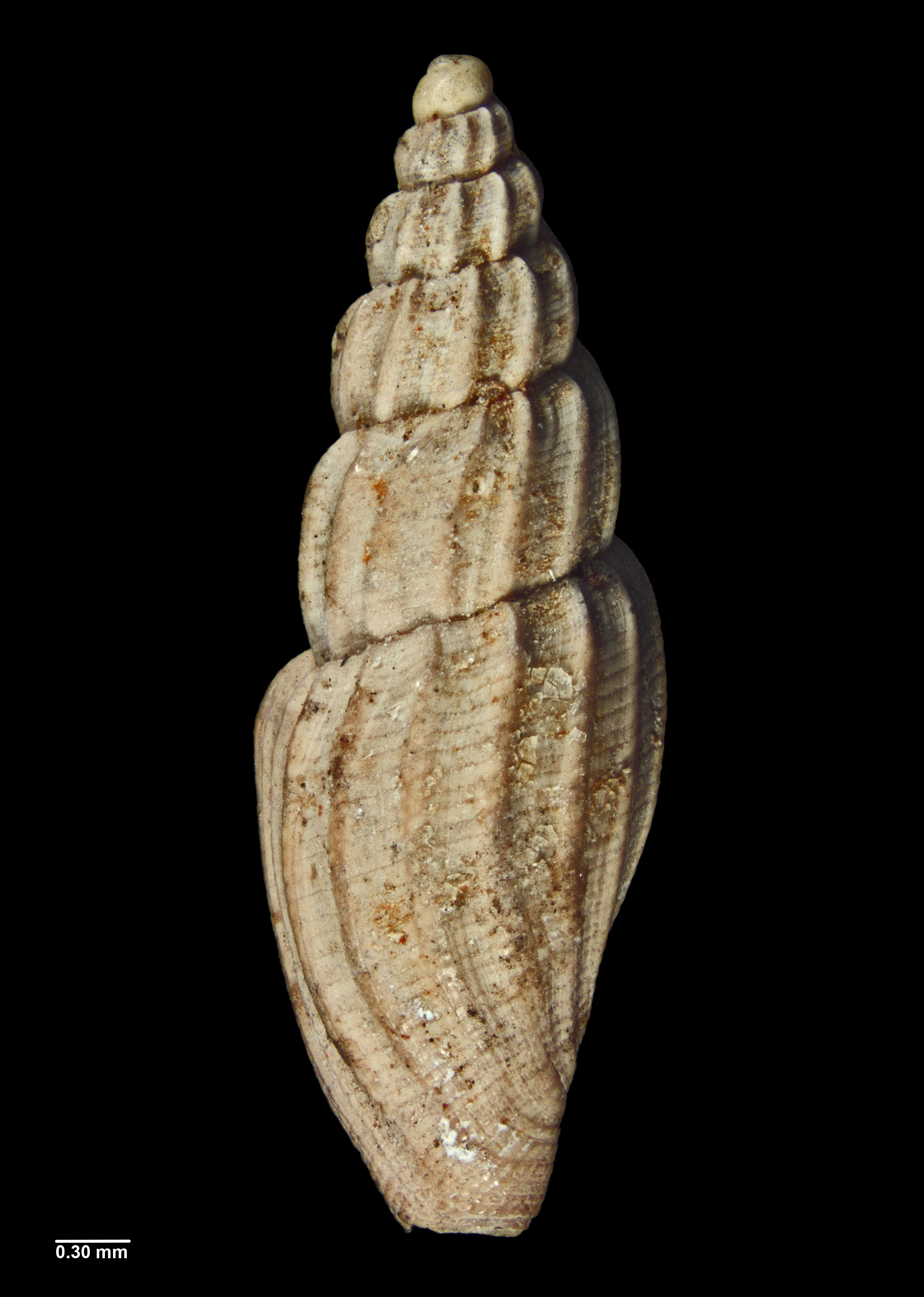
Reverse view of holotype

In the original description, Powell described the species as follows:

Elongate-fusiform. Whorls lightly convex, very slightly shouldered at three-fourths whorl height. Sculptured with strong, rounded, flexuous axials, 13 per whorl, extending from upper suture over base to neck; crossed by incised spiral grooves, 16 from suture to suture on the penultimate and about 42 on the body-whorl. Outer lip thin edged and slightly incurved, strengthened behind by a rounded varix. Sinus rounded, distinct, occupying shoulder.

The species has an axial sculpture of sinuous costae. The holotype of the species measures 9.8 mm (0.39 in) in height and 3.5 mm (0.14 in) in diameter, while another specimen seen by Powell measured 15.9 mm (0.63 in) by 5.2 mm (0.20 in).

== Taxonomy ==
The species was first described by A.W.B. Powell in 1944, as Guraleus (Paraguraleus) incisus. The species was moved to the genus Antiguraleus in 1970 by Thomas A. Darragh due to its distinctive curved costae and outer lip supported by a thick external varix, This recombination is not supported by the World Register of Marine Species, which gives the accepted name of the species as Paraguraleus incisus. The holotype was collected in 1919 by Walter Howchin and Joseph Verco from the Metropolitan Abattoirs Bore in Adelaide at a depth of between 122–152 m (400–499 ft), and is held by the Auckland War Memorial Museum.

== Distribution ==
This extinct marine species occurs in middle Miocene (Bairnsdalian) strata of the St Vincent Basin of South Australia, including the lower Dry Creek Sands Formation.
