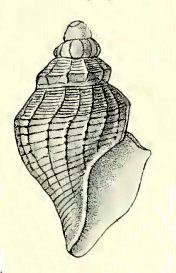
- Image of a shell of Antiguraleus ula

Scientific classification
- Kingdom: Animalia
- Phylum: Mollusca
- Class: Gastropoda
- Subclass: Caenogastropoda
- Order: Neogastropoda
- Superfamily: Conoidea
- Family: Mangeliidae
- Genus: Antiguraleus
- Species: A. ula

Binomial name
- Antiguraleus ula (R.B. Watson, 1881)

Synonyms
- Antiguraleus depressispirus (Beu, 1969); Bela ula (R.B. Watson, 1881); Mangilia ula R.B. Watson, 1881; † Mioawateria depressispira Beu, 1969; Pleurotoma (Bela) ula R.B. Watson, 1881; Pleurotoma (Drillia) ula R.B. Watson, 1881 (original combination)

= Antiguraleus ula =

Species of gastropod

Antiguraleus ula is a species of sea snail, a marine gastropod mollusk in the family Mangeliidae.

== Description ==
The length of the shell attains 6 mm, its diameter 3 mm.

(Original description) The small shell is fusiform, biconical, angulated, obsoletely ribbed and spirally striate. The siphonal canal short. The sculpture consists of about 18 axial, very oblique, rather obsolete riblets, parted by wider shallow furrows. They are strongest and somewhat mucronate at the angulation, extending over the base, but not over the beak. There are many fine hairlike growth lines. The spirals there are a great many remote fine threads, finer and closer on the shoulder than on the body whorl. Those at the carination are strong, ornamented with minute granules, which swell into small tubercles in crossing the riblets. The interstices of the ribs and the spirals are microscopically granulated. The colour of the shell is semitransparent, flinty, white, with a crisp aspect. The spire is scalar, conoidal. The protoconch consists of 2 globose whorls, the nucleus is immersed. They are remotely microscopically regularly striated. The shell contains 5 1/2½ whorls|, slowly increasing, with a long sloping shoulder and a sharp carinated angle, below which they are cylindrical, slightly contracted at the suture. The base of the shell is convexly contracted to the short broad siphonal canal. The suture is linear, well marked by the contraction of the whorls. The aperture is rather large, pyriform, with 3 angles above and a wide open siphonal canal below. The outer lip is thin, angulated. rectilinear above the angle, flatly curved below. The sinus is shallow and rounded. The columella is short and straight. The inner lip is thin and narrow.

== Distribution ==
This marine species occurs off North Island, East Cape to Otago, South Island, New Zealand, at a depth of 195 m.
