= Antiguraleus rishworthi =

Scientific classification
- Kingdom: Animalia
- Phylum: Mollusca
- Class: Gastropoda
- Subclass: Caenogastropoda
- Order: Neogastropoda
- Superfamily: Conoidea
- Family: Mangeliidae
- Genus: Antiguraleus
- Species: A. rishworthi

Binomial name
- Antiguraleus rishworthi Vella, 1954

Extinct species of gastropod

Antiguraleus rishworthi is an extinct species of sea snail, a marine gastropod mollusk in the family Mangeliidae.

A.G. Beu (2009) adopted Probebela for all the southern hemisphere taxa previously referred to Antiguraleus.

== Description ==
The length of the shell attains 4.8 mm (0.19 in), its diameter 2.9 mm (0.11 in).

== Distribution ==
This extinct marine species occurred in the North Island, New Zealand.
