= Antiguraleus subtruncatus =

Scientific classification
- Kingdom: Animalia
- Phylum: Mollusca
- Class: Gastropoda
- Subclass: Caenogastropoda
- Order: Neogastropoda
- Superfamily: Conoidea
- Family: Mangeliidae
- Genus: Antiguraleus
- Species: A. subtruncatus

Binomial name
- Antiguraleus subtruncatus A.W.B. Powell, 1942

Synonyms
- Propebela subtruncata (Powell, 1942)

Species of gastropod

Antiguraleus subtruncatus is a species of sea snail, a marine gastropod mollusk in the family Mangeliidae. It was first found by Arthur William Baden Powell in 1942.

== Description ==
The length of the shell attains 6.8 mm, its diameter is 3.2 mm.

== Distribution ==
This marine species occurs off the west coast of South Island, from Cook Strait to Otago, New Zealand.
