= Antiguraleus sericeus =

Scientific classification
- Kingdom: Animalia
- Phylum: Mollusca
- Class: Gastropoda
- Subclass: Caenogastropoda
- Order: Neogastropoda
- Superfamily: Conoidea
- Family: Mangeliidae
- Genus: Antiguraleus
- Species: A. sericeus

Binomial name
- Antiguraleus sericeus Kilburn, 1994

Species of gastropod

Antiguraleus sericeus is a species of sea snail, a marine gastropod mollusk in the family Mangeliidae.

== Description ==
The length of the shell attains 10.4 mm, its diameter is 3.5 mm.

== Distribution ==
This marine species occurs of Transkei, South Africa.
