= Antiguraleus perfluans =

Scientific classification
- Kingdom: Animalia
- Phylum: Mollusca
- Class: Gastropoda
- Subclass: Caenogastropoda
- Order: Neogastropoda
- Superfamily: Conoidea
- Family: Mangeliidae
- Genus: Antiguraleus
- Species: A. perfluans

Binomial name
- Antiguraleus perfluans (Barnard, 1958)

Synonyms
- Drillia perfluans Barnard, 1958 (original combination)

Species of gastropod

Antiguraleus perfluans is a species of sea snail, a marine gastropod mollusk in the family Mangeliidae.

== Distribution ==
This marine species occurs of KwaZulu-Natal, South Africa
