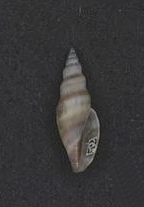
- Shell of Antiguraleus adcocki (museum specimen at Naturalis Biodiversity Center)

Scientific classification
- Kingdom: Animalia
- Phylum: Mollusca
- Class: Gastropoda
- Subclass: Caenogastropoda
- Order: Neogastropoda
- Superfamily: Conoidea
- Family: Mangeliidae
- Genus: Antiguraleus
- Species: A. adcocki

Binomial name
- Antiguraleus adcocki (G. B. Sowerby III, 1896)

Synonyms
- Cithara bella Adams, A. & Angas, G.F. 1864; Guraleus bellus (Adams & Angas, 1864); Mangelia boakei Tryon, G.W. 1884; Mangilia adcocki G. B. Sowerby III, 1896 (original combination); Marita bella (Adams & Angas, 1864)

= Antiguraleus adcocki =

Species of gastropod

Antiguraleus adcocki is a species of sea snail, a marine gastropod mollusk in the family Mangeliidae.

== Description ==
The length of the shell attains 14 mm.

(Original description).This is an elegantly formed shell, with a very acute spire and moderately attenuated base. The ribs are numerous, thick and rounded, crossed by numerous rather faint spiral sulci.

G.B. Sowerby III proposed in 1896 the name Mangilia adcocki as a nomen novum for the Mangilia bella of Adams and Angas (Proc. Zool. Soc. 1863, p. 419, pi. xxxvi, fig. 6), their name being preoccupied by Hinds. G.W. Tryon (Manual of Conchology, vol. vi, p. 270) considered it identical with Mangelia boakei, Nevill, a Ceylon shell with which from the figure and description, it seems to me to have but little affinity. Adcock's list gives as a synonym Mangilia gracilima, Tenison -Woods, but I have sought the records in vain for the name.

Charles Hedley stated in 1922 :"Sowerby changed the name of this species on the ground that Mangilia bella was preoccupied by Hinds, but as a matter of fact Mangilia was used for this species neither by Hinds nor by Adams and Angas, so that the innovation was not necessary. Tryon erred in ascribing this species to Ceylon." Hedley applied the name Guraleus bellus (Adams and Angas, 1863)

The Atlas of Living Australia considers Guraleus bellus a synonym of Marita bella (Adams & Angas, 1864)

== Distribution ==
This marine species is endemic to Australia and occurs off New South Wales, South Australia, Tasmania and Victoria.
