= Antiguraleus rossianus =

Scientific classification
- Kingdom: Animalia
- Phylum: Mollusca
- Class: Gastropoda
- Subclass: Caenogastropoda
- Order: Neogastropoda
- Superfamily: Conoidea
- Family: Mangeliidae
- Genus: Antiguraleus
- Species: A. rossianus

Binomial name
- Antiguraleus rossianus A.W.B. Powell, 1942

Synonyms
- Propebela rossiana (Powell, 1942)

Species of gastropod

Antiguraleus rossianus is a species of sea snail, a marine gastropod mollusk in the family Mangeliidae.

== Description ==
The length of the shell attains 4.3 mm, its diameter 1.8 mm.

Its functional group is Benthos.

Its feeding type is predatory.

== Distribution ==
This marine species occurs North of Auckland Islands, New Zealand.
