= Antiguraleus pulcherrimus =

Scientific classification
- Kingdom: Animalia
- Phylum: Mollusca
- Class: Gastropoda
- Subclass: Caenogastropoda
- Order: Neogastropoda
- Superfamily: Conoidea
- Family: Mangeliidae
- Genus: Antiguraleus
- Species: A. pulcherrimus

Binomial name
- Antiguraleus pulcherrimus Dell, 1956

Synonyms
- Propebela pulcherrima (Dell, 1956)

Species of gastropod

Antiguraleus pulcherrimus is a species of sea snail, a marine gastropod mollusk in the family Mangeliidae.

== Description ==
The length of the shell attains 9 mm, its diameter 3.8 mm.

Their functional group is benthos.

Their feeding type is predatory.

Their mating behaviour makes them a non-broadcast spawner.

Their life cycle does not include a trochophore stage.

== Distribution ==
This species occurs off Chatham Rise, off east coast North Island and South Island, New Zealand.
