= Antiguraleus necostatus =

Scientific classification
- Kingdom: Animalia
- Phylum: Mollusca
- Class: Gastropoda
- Subclass: Caenogastropoda
- Order: Neogastropoda
- Superfamily: Conoidea
- Family: Mangeliidae
- Genus: Antiguraleus
- Species: A. necostatus

Binomial name
- Antiguraleus necostatus Kilburn, 1994

Species of gastropod

Antiguraleus necostatus is a species of sea snail, a marine gastropod mollusk in the family Mangeliidae.

== Description ==
The length of the shell attains 8.8 mm, its diameter is 3.3 mm.

== Distribution ==
This marine species occurs off West Transkei, South Africa.
