= Antiguraleus fenestratus =

Scientific classification
- Kingdom: Animalia
- Phylum: Mollusca
- Class: Gastropoda
- Subclass: Caenogastropoda
- Order: Neogastropoda
- Superfamily: Conoidea
- Family: Mangeliidae
- Genus: Antiguraleus
- Species: A. fenestratus

Binomial name
- Antiguraleus fenestratus A.W.B. Powell, 1942

Synonyms
- Propebela fenestrata (Powell, 1942)

Species of gastropod

Antiguraleus fenestratus is a species of sea snail, a marine gastropod mollusk in the family Mangeliidae.

== Description ==
The length of the shell attains 5.4 mm, its diameter 2.3 mm.

== Distribution ==
This species occurs off Ninety Mile Beach, North Island, New Zealand.
