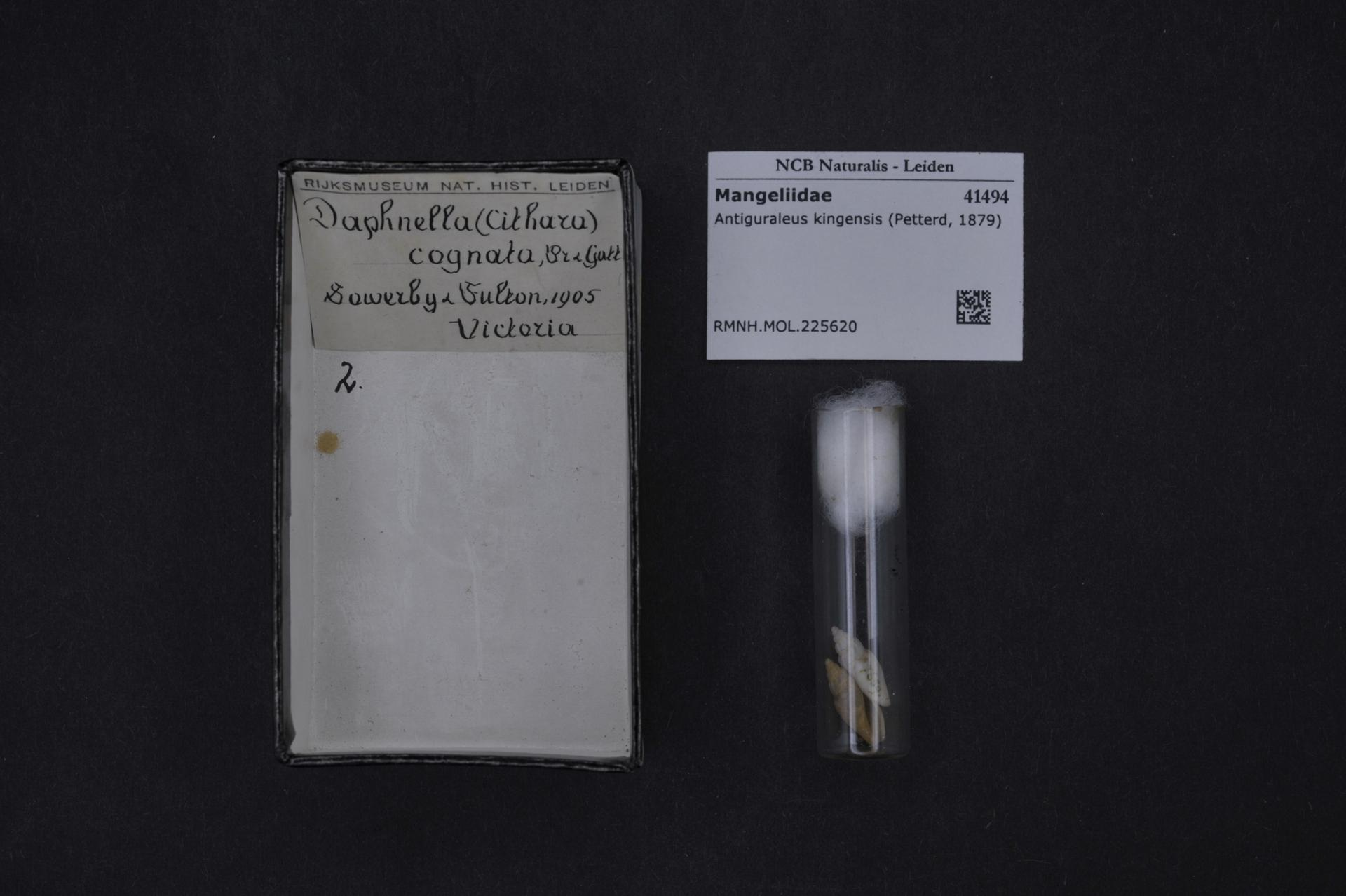

Scientific classification
- Kingdom: Animalia
- Phylum: Mollusca
- Class: Gastropoda
- Subclass: Caenogastropoda
- Order: Neogastropoda
- Superfamily: Conoidea
- Family: Mangeliidae
- Genus: Antiguraleus
- Species: A. kingensis

Binomial name
- Antiguraleus kingensis (Petterd, 1879)

Synonyms
- Cithara cognata Pritchard, G.B. & J.H. Gatliff, 1899; Cithara kingenensis [sic] Petterd, 1879; Cythara kingensis (Petterd, 1879); Daphnella kingensis Petterd, 1879 (original combination); Daphnella kingenensis [sic] Petterd, 1879; Guraleus kingensis (Petterd, 1879); Mangilia emina Hedley, 1905; Mangilia kingensis (Petterd, 1879)

= Antiguraleus kingensis =

Species of gastropod

Antiguraleus kingensis is a species of sea snail, a marine gastropod mollusk in the family Mangeliidae.

== Description ==
The length of the shell attains 5.7 mm, and its diameter is 2.5 mm.

This is a very variable species It may be 16 mm. long, as in the type of Cithara cognata, 11 mm. as in Mangilia emina, or 575 mm. as in some adult examples of mine. In shape it may be long and narrow, or short and broad. In sculpture it may have axial ribs, well marked, narrow, almost lamelliform, or round and solid, or low, or quite obsolete, especially on the body whorl. The spiral lirae may be quite valid, or revealed only by a fairly high power of the microscope. Generally the spirals are best marked when the axials are small. The colour may be a uniform brown tint, or there may be spiral colour bands of different widths, or the shell may be white.

== Distribution ==
This marine species is endemic to Australia and occurs off South Australia, Tasmania and Victoria
