= Antiguraleus makaraensis =

Scientific classification
- Kingdom: Animalia
- Phylum: Mollusca
- Class: Gastropoda
- Subclass: Caenogastropoda
- Order: Neogastropoda
- Superfamily: Conoidea
- Family: Mangeliidae
- Genus: Antiguraleus
- Species: A. makaraensis

Binomial name
- Antiguraleus makaraensis Vella, 1954

Extinct species of gastropod

Antiguraleus makaraensis is an extinct species of sea snail, a marine gastropod mollusk in the family Mangeliidae.

A.G. Beu (2009) adopted Probebela for all the southern hemisphere taxa previously referred to Antiguraleus.

== Description ==
The length of the shell attains 7 mm, its diameter 3 mm.

== Distribution ==
This extinct marine species occurred in the North Island, New Zealand.
