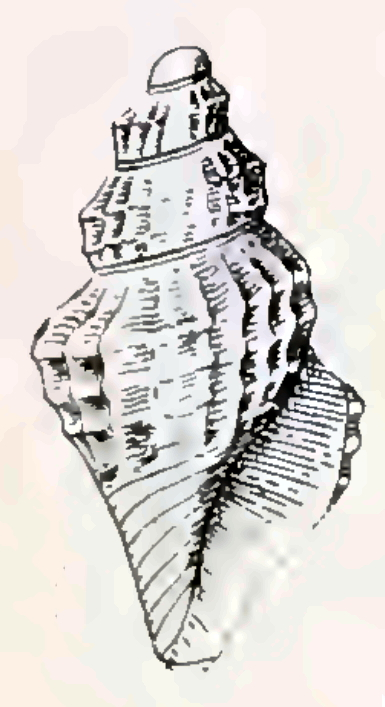
- Original image of a shell of Antiguraleus murrheus

Scientific classification
- Kingdom: Animalia
- Phylum: Mollusca
- Class: Gastropoda
- Subclass: Caenogastropoda
- Order: Neogastropoda
- Superfamily: Conoidea
- Family: Mangeliidae
- Genus: Antiguraleus
- Species: A. murrheus

Binomial name
- Antiguraleus murrheus (W.H. Webster, 1906)

Synonyms
- Mangilia murrhea Webster, 1906 (original combination); Propebela murrhea (Webster, 1906)

= Antiguraleus murrheus =

Species of gastropod

Antiguraleus murrheus is a species of sea snail, a marine gastropod mollusk in the family Mangeliidae.

== Description ==
The length of the shell attains 5 mm, its diameter 3 mm.

(Original description) The white shell is semitransparent. It contains 4 1/2 whorls, including a smooth protoconch of 1 1/4 whorls. The sculpture consists of longitudinal ribs, stronger on the earlier whorls, weaker towards the body whorl, which has about fifteen ribs extending to the suture. These ribs are crossed by faint spirals, the posterior or peripheral being the strongest, two on the second whorl, three above the aperture, a fourth on the body whorl, beyond which the longitudinal ribs only persist a short distance. The whorls are tabulated above the periphery. Seen under a lens, it shows many subsidiary spiral striations between the main spirals. The suture is well marked by a narrow overlapping of each whorl by the one following. The base has fifteen spiral striae. The aperture shows a conspicuous sinus in the infrasutural tabulation, but there is no anal fasciole. The type is waterworn.

== Distribution ==
This marine species occurs off Northland Region east coast to Cook Strait, New Zealand.
