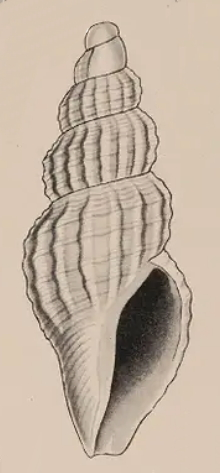
- Shell of Antiguraleus pedicus (holotype)

Scientific classification
- Kingdom: Animalia
- Phylum: Mollusca
- Class: Gastropoda
- Subclass: Caenogastropoda
- Order: Neogastropoda
- Superfamily: Conoidea
- Family: Mangeliidae
- Genus: Antiguraleus
- Species: A. pedicus

Binomial name
- Antiguraleus pedicus A.W.B. Powell, 1942

Synonyms
- Propebela pedica (Powell, 1942)

= Antiguraleus pedicus =

Species of gastropod

Antiguraleus pedicus is a species of sea snail, a marine gastropod mollusk in the family Mangeliidae.

== Description ==
The length of the shell of the holotype attains 5.7 mm, its diameter 2.3 mm.

(Original description) The shell is small, white, and narrowly fusiform in shape, featuring rounded whorls. The spire is 1.15 times the combined height of the aperture and the siphonal canal. The base contracts very gradually toward a siphonal canal that is moderately long and broadly open. There are five whorls in total, including the protoconch.

The sculpture is relatively weak, with the axial elements being more prominent than the spirals. There are 14 to 16 narrowly rounded axials per whorl. On the spire whorls, the ornamentation consists of four regular, closely spaced, weak spirals located above the middle, and three stronger, more widely spaced spirals positioned below. On the base, six spaced spiral cords merge into approximately 12 linear-spaced threads, which eventually become indistinct over the fasciole. Additionally, fine, linear-spaced spiral threads occupy the interstices between the primary cords.

== Distribution ==
This species occurs off Otago Heads, Otago and Snares Islands, New Zealand.
