= Antiguraleus taranakiensis =

Scientific classification
- Kingdom: Animalia
- Phylum: Mollusca
- Class: Gastropoda
- Subclass: Caenogastropoda
- Order: Neogastropoda
- Superfamily: Conoidea
- Family: Mangeliidae
- Genus: Antiguraleus
- Species: A. taranakiensis

Binomial name
- Antiguraleus taranakiensis (Marwick, 1926)

Synonyms
- † Mangilia taranakiensis Marwick, 1926

Extinct species of gastropod

Antiguraleus taranakiensis is an extinct species of sea snail, a marine gastropod mollusk in the family Mangeliidae. It is found in New Zealand.

A.G. Beu (2009) adopted Probebela for all the southern hemisphere taxa previously referred to Antiguraleus.

== Description ==
The length of the shell attains 6 mm, its diameter is 4 mm.

== Distribution ==
This extinct marine species occurred on New Zealand in Late Middle Miocene-Late Miocene strata (Waiauan-Kapitean).
