= Antiguraleus morgana =

Scientific classification
- Kingdom: Animalia
- Phylum: Mollusca
- Class: Gastropoda
- Subclass: Caenogastropoda
- Order: Neogastropoda
- Superfamily: Conoidea
- Family: Mangeliidae
- Genus: Antiguraleus
- Species: A. morgana

Binomial name
- Antiguraleus morgana (Barnard, 1958)

Synonyms
- Drillia morgana Barnard, 1958 (original combination)

Species of gastropod

Antiguraleus morgana is a species of sea snail, a marine gastropod mollusk in the family Mangeliidae.

== Description ==
The shell of Antiguraleus morgana reaches a length of 9.1 mm (0.36 in) and a diameter of 3.3 mm (0.13 in). It is elongated and turreted with a pointed apex, featuring fine axial ribs and subtle spiral striations typical of the Mangeliidae family. The aperture is narrow, and the outer lip is thin but slightly reinforced, often showing a shallow sinus near the suture. The coloration is generally pale, ranging from off-white to light brown, occasionally with faint darker banding along the whorls.

This species inhabits sandy seabeds along the eastern coast of South Africa, from East Cape Province to Transkei, at depths of 40 to 100 m (130 to 330 ft). It is carnivorous, preying on small benthic invertebrates such as polychaete worms and tiny crustaceans. By feeding on these organisms, it contributes to the structure and energy flow of the coastal marine food web. The snail is typically found partially buried in sediment during the day and may emerge to hunt at night. Its small size and specific habitat preference make it an indicator of benthic ecosystem health in the region.

== Distribution ==
This marine species occurs off East Cape Province to Transkei, South Africa.

The species is found along the eastern coast of South Africa, where it occupies soft marine sediments and contributes to the region's overall molluscan diversity.
