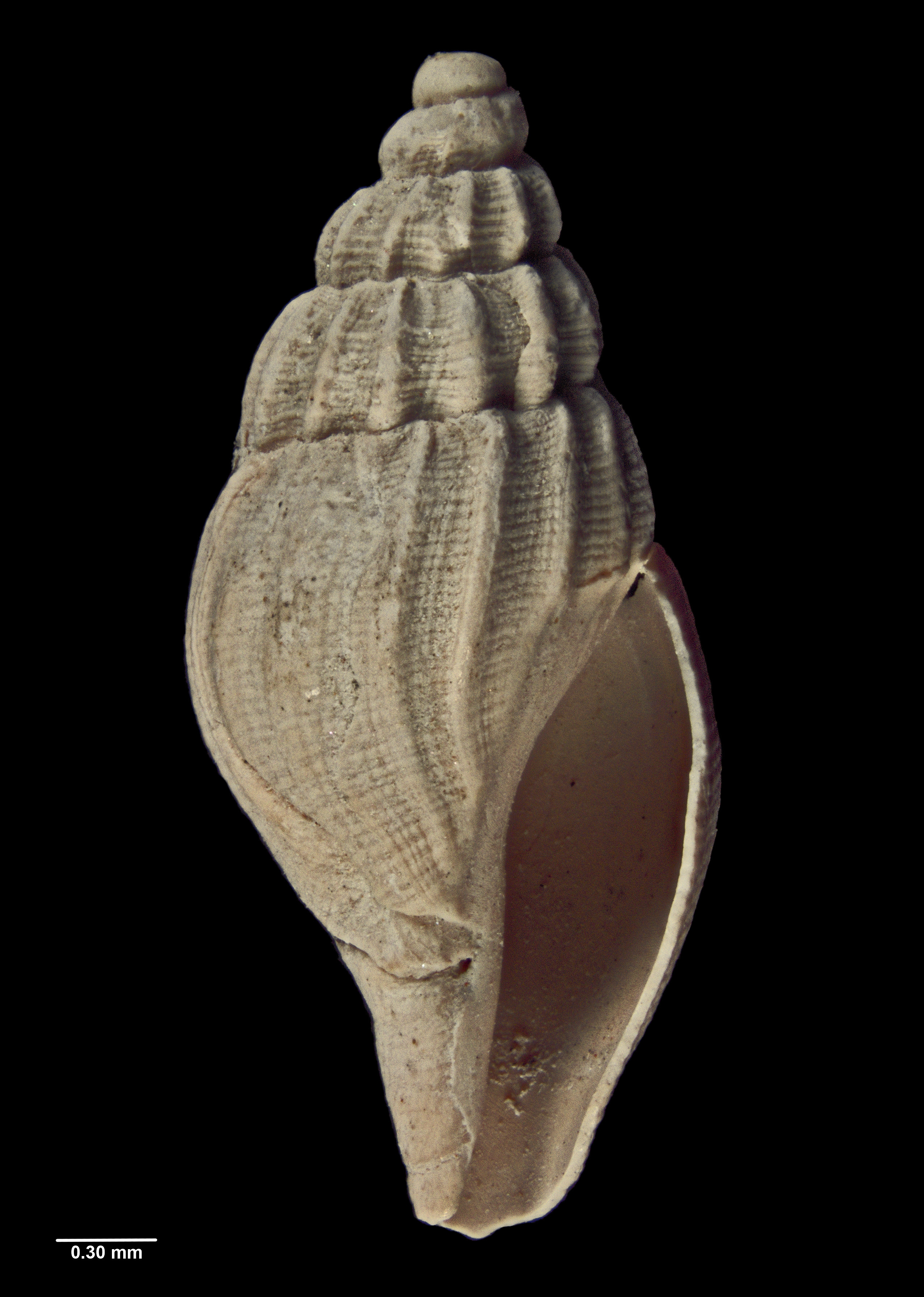
- Holotype from Auckland War Memorial Museum

Scientific classification
- Kingdom: Animalia
- Phylum: Mollusca
- Class: Gastropoda
- Subclass: Caenogastropoda
- Order: Neogastropoda
- Family: Mangeliidae
- Genus: Paraguraleus
- Species: †P. abbreviatus

Binomial name
- †Paraguraleus abbreviatus (Powell, 1944)

Synonyms
- † Antiguraleus abbreviatus (A.W.B. Powell, 1944); † Guraleus (Paraguraleus) abbreviatus A.W.B. Powell, 1944; † Guraleus abbreviatus A.W.B. Powell, 1944; † Propebela abbreviatus (A.W.B. Powell, 1944)

= Paraguraleus abbreviatus =

Paraguraleus abbreviatus Temporal range: late Oligocene–Early Miocene

Extinct species of gastropod

Paraguraleus abbreviatus is an extinct species of sea snail, a marine gastropod mollusc in the family Mangeliidae. Fossils of the species date to the middle Miocene, and have been found in strata of the St Vincent Basin of South Australia.

== Description ==
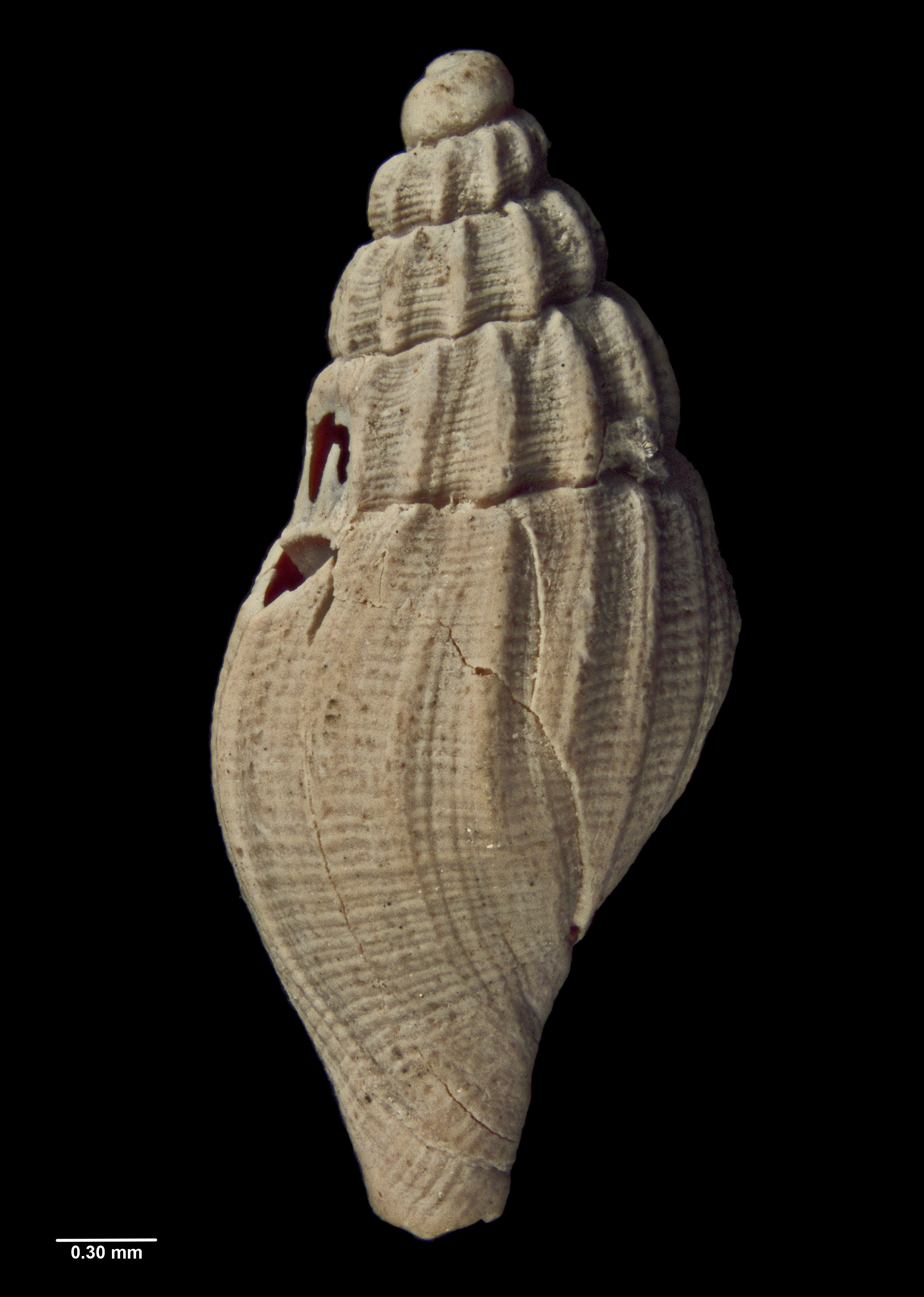
Reverse view of holotype

In the original description, Powell described the species as follows:

Ovate-fusiform. Whorls convex, not shouldered. Sculptured with heavy, rounded axials, 12-14 per whorl, extending from upper suture to lower part of base, crossed by fine, regular, closely spaced spiral threads, 14-15 from suture to suture on the penultimate, and about 40 on the body-whorl. The outer lip is thin edged and slightly incurved, strengthened behind by an axial. Sinus rounded, shallow.

The holotype of the species measures 5.9 mm (0.23 in) in height and 2.5 mm (0.098 in) in diameter, and a different type specimen seen by Powell measured 7.3 mm (0.29 in) by 3.25 mm (0.128 in).

== Taxonomy ==
The species was first described by A.W.B. Powell in 1944, as Guraleus (Paraguraleus) abbreviatus. The species was moved to the genus Antiguraleus in 1970 by Thomas A. Darragh, This recombination is not supported by the World Register of Marine Species, which gives the accepted name of the species as Paraguraleus abbreviatus. The holotype was collected from the Metropolitan Abattoirs Bore in Adelaide at a depth of 122–152 m (400–499 ft) by Walter Howchin and Joseph Verco in 1919, and is held by the Auckland War Memorial Museum.

== Ecology ==
P. abbreviatus was an epifaunal carnivore.

== Distribution ==
This extinct marine species occurs in middle Miocene (Bairnsdalian) strata of the St Vincent Basin, including the lower Dry Creek Sands Formation of South Australia.
