= Antiguraleus multistriatus =

Scientific classification
- Kingdom: Animalia
- Phylum: Mollusca
- Class: Gastropoda
- Subclass: Caenogastropoda
- Order: Neogastropoda
- Superfamily: Conoidea
- Family: Mangeliidae
- Genus: Antiguraleus
- Species: A. multistriatus

Binomial name
- Antiguraleus multistriatus Dell, 1956

Synonyms
- Propebela multistriata (Dell, 1956)

Species of gastropod

Antiguraleus multistriatus is a species of sea snail, a marine gastropod mollusk in the family Mangeliidae.

== Description ==
The length of the shell attains 8 mm, its diameter is 3.7 mm.

== Distribution ==
This species occurs off Chatham Rise, New Zealand, at depths between 530–600 m.
