= Antiguraleus stellatomoides =

Scientific classification
- Kingdom: Animalia
- Phylum: Mollusca
- Class: Gastropoda
- Subclass: Caenogastropoda
- Order: Neogastropoda
- Superfamily: Conoidea
- Family: Mangeliidae
- Genus: Antiguraleus
- Species: A. stellatomoides

Binomial name
- Antiguraleus stellatomoides Shuto, 1983

Synonyms
- Eucithara stellatomoides (Shuto, 1883)

Species of gastropod

Antiguraleus stellatomoides is a species of sea snail, a marine gastropod mollusk in the family Mangeliidae.

== Distribution ==
This marine species occurs of Taiwan
