= Antiguraleus galatea =

Scientific classification
- Kingdom: Animalia
- Phylum: Mollusca
- Class: Gastropoda
- Subclass: Caenogastropoda
- Order: Neogastropoda
- Superfamily: Conoidea
- Family: Mangeliidae
- Genus: Antiguraleus
- Species: A. galatea

Binomial name
- Antiguraleus galatea Kilburn, 1994

Species of gastropod

Antiguraleus galatea is a species of sea snail, a marine gastropod mollusk in the family Mangeliidae.

== Description ==
The length of the shell attains 5 mm, its diameter 2.4 mm.

== Distribution ==
This marine species is endemic and is usually found in West Transkei, South Africa
