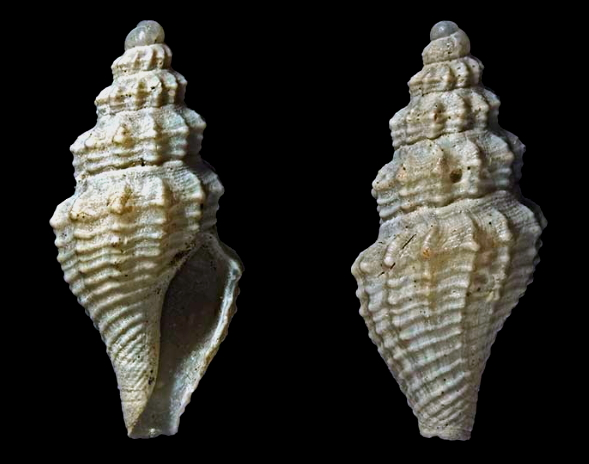
- Shell of Antiguraleus otagoensis (holotype at the Auckland Museum)

Scientific classification
- Kingdom: Animalia
- Phylum: Mollusca
- Class: Gastropoda
- Subclass: Caenogastropoda
- Order: Neogastropoda
- Superfamily: Conoidea
- Family: Mangeliidae
- Genus: Antiguraleus
- Species: A. otagoensis

Binomial name
- Antiguraleus otagoensis A.W.B. Powell, 1942

Synonyms
- Propebela otagoensis (Powell, 1942)

= Antiguraleus otagoensis =

Species of gastropod

Antiguraleus otagoensis is a species of sea snail, a marine gastropod mollusk in the family Mangeliidae.

== Description ==
The length of the shell attains 8 mm, its diameter is 4 mm. This species is a non-broadcast spawner and its life cycle does not include a trocophore stage.

== Distribution ==
This species occurs in the North-western South Island and Eastern Island off the Cook Strait to Otago and off Chatham Islands, New Zealand.
