= Antiguraleus abnormis =

Scientific classification
- Kingdom: Animalia
- Phylum: Mollusca
- Class: Gastropoda
- Subclass: Caenogastropoda
- Order: Neogastropoda
- Superfamily: Conoidea
- Family: Mangeliidae
- Genus: Antiguraleus
- Species: A. abnormis

Binomial name
- Antiguraleus abnormis (Hutton, 1885)

Synonyms
- † Clathurella abnormis W.F. Hutton, 1885; † Propebela abnormis (Hutton, 1885)

Extinct species of gastropod

Antiguraleus abnormis is an extinct species of sea snail, a marine gastropod mollusk in the family Mangeliidae.

A.G. Beu (2009) adopted Probebela for all the southern hemisphere taxa previously referred to Antiguraleus.

== Description ==
The length of the shell attains 6.5 mm.

(Original description) The spire of this minute and mitriform shell is produced and acute. It contains 6½ whorls, the first 1½ whorls are embryonic and polished. The others are angled, strongly longitudinally costate and delicately spirally lined. There are 11 longitudinal ribs on a whorl, which are crossed by three or four spiral threads in front of the angle, none behind it. On the body whorl, the spiral threads in front of the angle are about twelve, some of which are stronger than the others. The aperture is linear. The outer lip is rather thick nut not grooved. There is a posterior shallow sinus above the angle. The columella is smooth.

== Distribution ==
This extinct marine species occurred in New Zealand.
