= Antiguraleus abernethyi =

Scientific classification
- Kingdom: Animalia
- Phylum: Mollusca
- Class: Gastropoda
- Subclass: Caenogastropoda
- Order: Neogastropoda
- Superfamily: Conoidea
- Family: Mangeliidae
- Genus: Antiguraleus
- Species: A. abernethyi

Binomial name
- Antiguraleus abernethyi Dell, 1956

Synonyms
- Propebela abernethyi (Dell, 1956)

Species of gastropod

Antiguraleus abernethyi is a species of sea snail, a marine gastropod mollusk in the family Mangeliidae.

== Description ==
The length of the shell attains 7 mm, its diameter is 2.4 mm.

== Distribution ==
This species occurs off Ninety Mile Beach, North Island, New Zealand.
