= Antiguraleus fusiformis =

Scientific classification
- Kingdom: Animalia
- Phylum: Mollusca
- Class: Gastropoda
- Subclass: Caenogastropoda
- Order: Neogastropoda
- Superfamily: Conoidea
- Family: Mangeliidae
- Genus: Antiguraleus
- Species: A. fusiformis

Binomial name
- Antiguraleus fusiformis Dell, 1956

Synonyms
- Propebela fusiformis (Dell, 1956)

Species of gastropod

Antiguraleus fusiformis is a species of sea snail, a marine gastropod mollusk in the family Mangeliidae.

== Description ==
The length of the shell attains 6 mm, its diameter 3 mm.

== Distribution ==
This species occurs off Ninety Mile Beach, North Island, New Zealand, at depths between 475–640 m.; also off Chatham Islands and Cook Strait.
