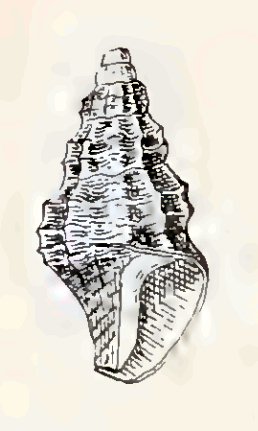
- Original image of a shell of Antiguraleus infandus

Scientific classification
- Kingdom: Animalia
- Phylum: Mollusca
- Class: Gastropoda
- Subclass: Caenogastropoda
- Order: Neogastropoda
- Superfamily: Conoidea
- Family: Mangeliidae
- Genus: Antiguraleus
- Species: A. infandus

Binomial name
- Antiguraleus infandus (Webster, 1906)

Synonyms
- Antiguraleus infanda [sic] (incorrect gender ending); Mangilia infanda Webster, 1906 (original combination); Propebela infanda (Powell, 1942)

= Antiguraleus infandus =

Species of mollusc

Antiguraleus infandus is a species of sea snail, a marine gastropod mollusk in the family Mangeliidae.

== Description ==
The length of the shell attains 6 mm, its diameter 3 mm.

(Original description) The shell is white and chalky. It contains 5 rounded whorls, including a smooth protoconch of about 1½ whorl. The shell is longitudinally vertically ribbed, the ribs strong right up to the suture and persisting faintly down the base. The body whorl shows about nine ribs. Strong spirals cross the ribs, two on the second whorl, three above the aperture, a fourth and faint fifth on the body-whorl. The sutures of the early whorls are sharp. of those succeeding concavely rounded. The base is spirally striated. The type is worn—the protoconch damaged, and the outer lip broken away for a quarter of a whorl. There are spiral striations between the main spirals, and these are strongest on the somewhat hollow infrasutural tabulation. There is no anal fasciole.

== Distribution ==
This marine species occurs off Great Barrier Island, New Zealand.
