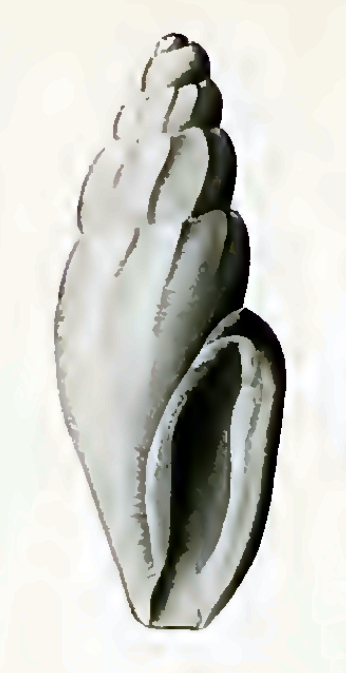
- Original image of a shell of Antiguraleus permutatus

Scientific classification
- Kingdom: Animalia
- Phylum: Mollusca
- Class: Gastropoda
- Subclass: Caenogastropoda
- Order: Neogastropoda
- Superfamily: Conoidea
- Family: Mangeliidae
- Genus: Antiguraleus
- Species: A. permutatus

Binomial name
- Antiguraleus permutatus (Hedley, 1922)

Synonyms
- Guraleus permutatus Hedley, 1922 (original combination); Paraguraleus permutatus (Hedley, 1922)

= Antiguraleus permutatus =

Species of gastropod

Antiguraleus permutatus is a species of sea snail, a marine gastropod mollusk in the family Mangeliidae.

== Description ==
The length of the shell attains 5.7 mm, its diameter 2.5 mm.

(Original description) The small shell has an ovate-cylindrical shape and is rather gibbous. Its colour is white on the protoconch, and pale cream on the remainder of the shell. It contains 5 whorls of which two compose a rather elevate protoconch. Its sculpture shows on the first adult whorl are ten narrow, elevated, wide-spaced radials. These degenerate as growth advances; from the last suture they persist as downward dashes, and vanish on the anterior half of the shell. The entire surface carries dense microscopic spiral scratches. The aperture is narrow and vertical. The varix is prominent and expanded. Near the summit is excavated a broad and shallow sinus, and at two-thirds of its length occurs a stromboid insinuation A thin free edge reaches over the aperture. On the columella is a substantial callus. The siphonal canal is short, wide, and open.

== Distribution ==
This marine species is endemic to Australia and occurs off New South Wales.
