= Antiguraleus alternatus =

Scientific classification
- Kingdom: Animalia
- Phylum: Mollusca
- Class: Gastropoda
- Subclass: Caenogastropoda
- Order: Neogastropoda
- Superfamily: Conoidea
- Family: Mangeliidae
- Genus: Antiguraleus
- Species: A. alternatus

Binomial name
- Antiguraleus alternatus (Laseron, 1954)

Synonyms
- Paraguraleus alternatus Laseron, 1954 (original combination)

Species of gastropod

Antiguraleus alternatus is a species of sea snail, a marine gastropod mollusk in the family Mangeliidae.

== Distribution ==
This marine species is endemic to Australia and occurs off New South Wales
