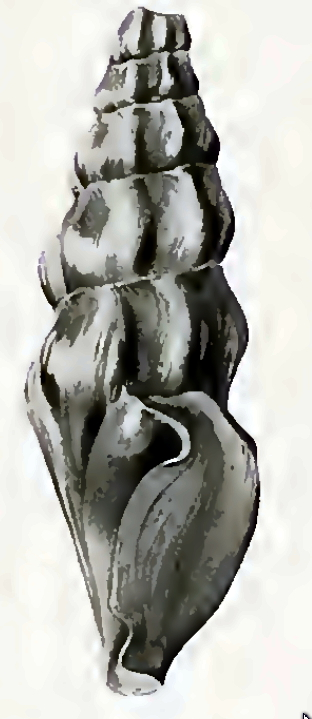
- Original image of a shell of Antiguraleus aeneus

Scientific classification
- Kingdom: Animalia
- Phylum: Mollusca
- Class: Gastropoda
- Subclass: Caenogastropoda
- Order: Neogastropoda
- Superfamily: Conoidea
- Family: Mangeliidae
- Genus: Antiguraleus
- Species: A. aeneus

Binomial name
- Antiguraleus aeneus (Hedley, 1922)

Synonyms
- Austroclavus aeneus (Hedley, 1922); Clavus aeneus Hedley, 1922 (original combination)

= Antiguraleus aeneus =

Species of gastropod

Antiguraleus aeneus is a species of sea snail, a marine gastropod mollusk in the family Mangeliidae.

== Description ==
The length of the shell attains 11 mm, its diameter 4 mm.

(Original description) The small, solid shell has a cylindro-fusiform shape. It is polished and constricted at the sutures. On decollate specimens six whorls remain, divided by linear sutures. The colour of the shell is amber-brown, with ochraceous reflections. The sculpture shows prominent, arcuate ribs, each slightly overhanging the one below, seven to a whorl, consecutive on the spire, smaller on the body whorl where they do not reach the base. On the base and snout are six revolving threads. The aperture is rather wide, flanked by a tall and thick varix. The edge of the outer lip is thin, insinuate at the base. The columella is perpendicular and concave. The siphonal canal is short and wide. The sinus is wide and shallow. A prominent callus knob is prominent at the lip insertion.

== Distribution ==
This marine species is endemic to Australia and occurs off Queensland.
