= Antiguraleus =

Scientific classification
- Kingdom: Animalia
- Phylum: Mollusca
- Class: Gastropoda
- Subclass: Caenogastropoda
- Order: Neogastropoda
- Superfamily: Conoidea
- Family: Mangeliidae
- Genus: Antiguraleus; Powell, 1942

Type species
- Antiguraleus otagoensis Powell, 1942

Species
- See text

Genus of gastropods

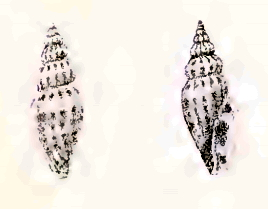
Antiguraleus adcocki, family Mangeliidae

Antiguraleus is a genus of sea snails, marine gastropod mollusks in the family Mangeliidae.

== Species ==
Species within the genus Antiguraleus include:

- † Antiguraleus abbreviatus Powell 1944
- Antiguraleus abernethyi Dell, 1956
- † Antiguraleus abnormis (Hutton, 1885)
- Antiguraleus adcocki (G.B. Sowerby III, 1896)
- Antiguraleus aeneus (Hedley, 1922)
- Antiguraleus alternatus (Laseron, 1954)
- Antiguraleus costatus (Hedley, 1922)
- † Antiguraleus deceptus Powell, 1942
- Antiguraleus fenestratus Powell, 1942
- Antiguraleus fusiformis Dell, 1956
- Antiguraleus galatea Kilburn, 1994
- Antiguraleus howelli (Laseron, 1954)
- Antiguraleus infandus (Webster, 1906)
- Antiguraleus kingensis (Petterd, 1879)
- † Antiguraleus makaraensis Vella, 1954
- Antiguraleus morgana (Barnard, 1958)
- Antiguraleus multistriatus Dell, 1956
- Antiguraleus mundus (Suter, 1909)
- Antiguraleus murrheus (Webster, 1906)
- Antiguraleus necostatus Kilburn, 1994
- Antiguraleus otagoensis Powell, 1942
- Antiguraleus pedicus Powell, 1942
- Antiguraleus perfluans (Barnard, 1958)
- Antiguraleus permutatus (Hedley, 1922)
- Antiguraleus pulcherrimus Dell, 1956
- † Antiguraleus rishworthi Vella, 1954
- Antiguraleus rossianus Powell, 1942
- Antiguraleus sericeus Kilburn, 1994
- Antiguraleus serpentis (Laseron, 1954)
- Antiguraleus stellatomoides Shuto, 1983
- Antiguraleus subitus (Laseron, 1954)
- Antiguraleus subtruncatus Powell, 1942
- † Antiguraleus taranakiensis (Marwick, 1926)
- Antiguraleus tepidus (Laseron, 1954)
- Antiguraleus ula (Watson, 1881)

Species brought into synonymy

- Antiguraleus costatus wilesianus (Hedley, 1922): synonym of Antiguraleus costatus (Hedley, 1922)
- Antiguraleus depressispirus (Beu, 1969): synonym of Antiguraleus ula (Watson, 1881)
- Antiguraleus emina (Hedley, 1905): synonym of Paraguraleus emina (Hedley, 1905)
- Antiguraleus emina brevostium (Laseron, 1954): synonym of Antiguraleus kingensis brevostium (C.F. Laseron, 1954)
- Antiguraleus infanda [sic]: synonym of Antiguraleus infandus (Webster, 1906)
- Antiguraleus lucidus (Laseron, 1954): synonym of Paraguraleus lucidus Laseron, 1954
- Antiguraleus munda [sic]: synonym of Antiguraleus mundus (Suter, 1909)
- Antiguraleus thetis (E. A. Smith, 1904): synonym of Striatoguraleus thetis (E. A. Smith, 1904)
- Antiguraleus wilesianus (Hedley, 1922): synonym of Guraleus wilesianus Hedley, 1922
