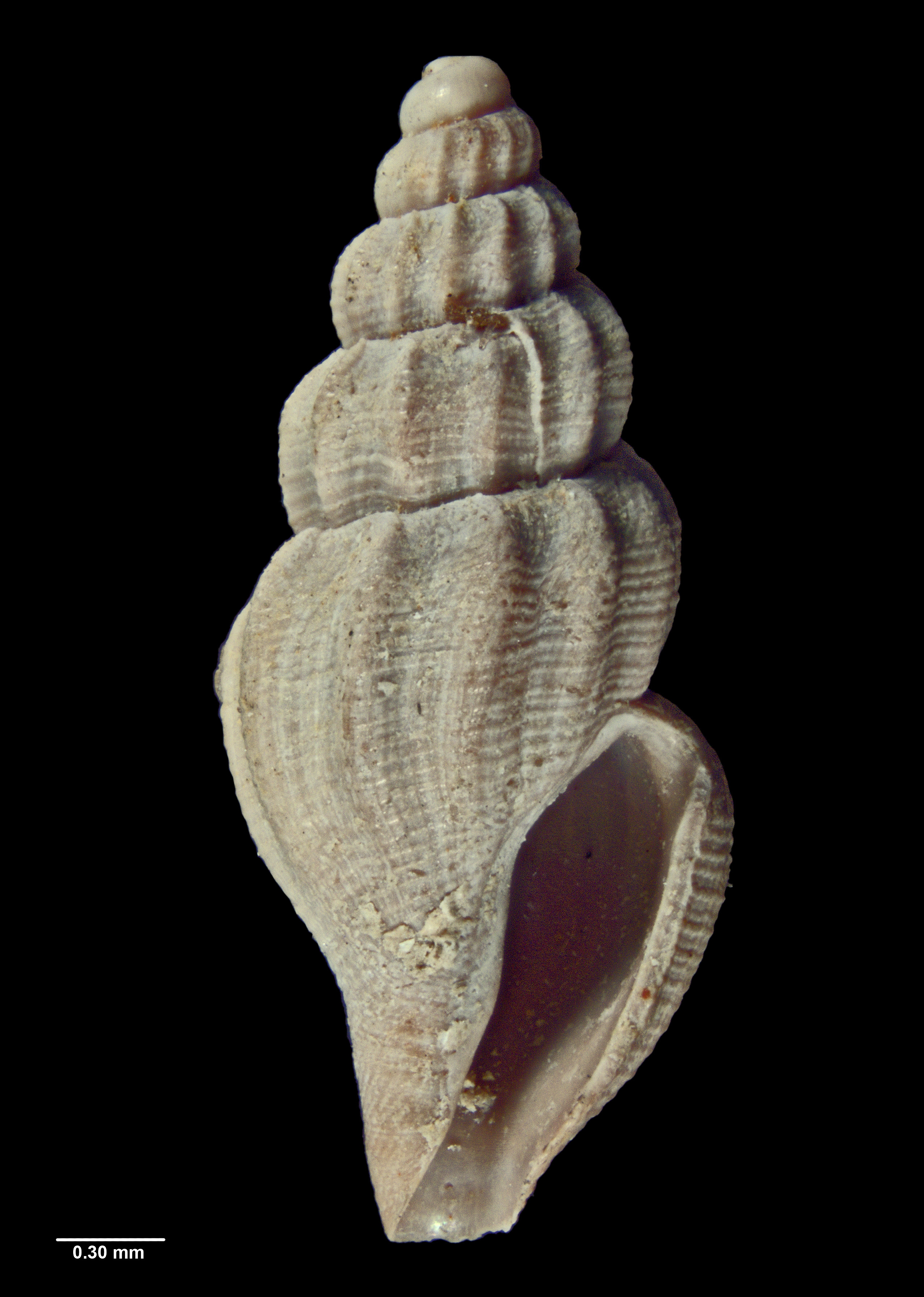
- Holotype from Auckland War Memorial Museum

Scientific classification
- Kingdom: Animalia
- Phylum: Mollusca
- Class: Gastropoda
- Subclass: Caenogastropoda
- Order: Neogastropoda
- Family: Mangeliidae
- Genus: Paraguraleus
- Species: †P. finlayi

Binomial name
- †Paraguraleus finlayi (Powell, 1944)

Synonyms
- † Antiguraleus finlayi (A.W.B. Powell, 1944); † Guraleus (Paraguraleus) finlayi A.W.B. Powell, 1944; † Guraleus finlayi A.W.B. Powell, 1944; † Propebela finlayi (A.W.B. Powell, 1944)

= Paraguraleus finlayi =

Paraguraleus finlayi Temporal range: late Oligocene–Early Miocene

Extinct species of gastropod

Paraguraleus finlayi is an extinct species of sea snail, a marine gastropod mollusc in the family Mangeliidae. Fossils of the species date to the late Oligocene and early Miocene, and have been found in strata of the Port Phillip Basin of Victoria, Australia.

== Description ==
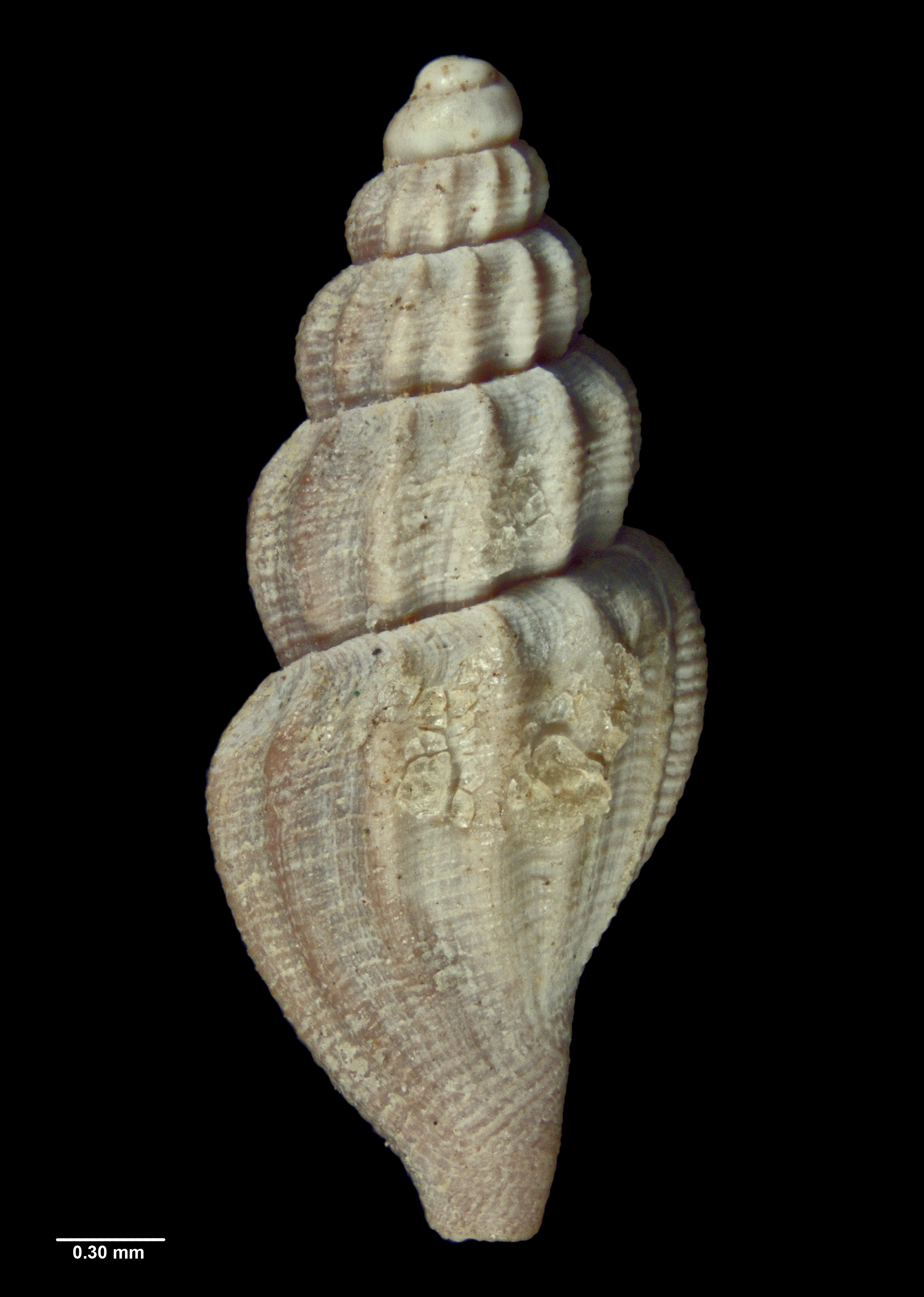
Reverse view of holotype

In the original description, Powell described the species as follows:

Ovate-fusiform. Whorls convex, bluntly angled at two-thirds whorl height. Sculptured with heavy rounded axials, 12 per whorl, extending from upper suture over base to neck. These are crossed by fine, closely spaced, spiral threads, much weaker on shoulder, 18 from suture to suture on penultimate and about 48 on the body-whorl. Outer lip thin edged, strengthened behind by an axial. Sinus rounded, distinct, occupying shoulder.

The holotype of the species measures 6.95 mm (0.274 in) in height and 3.0 mm (0.12 in) in diameter.

== Taxonomy ==
The species was first described by A.W.B. Powell in 1944, as Guraleus (Paraguraleus) finlayi. The accepted name became Paraguraleus balcombensis when the subgenus was raised to genus level. The holotype was collected from Torquay, Victoria at an unknown date earlier than 1944, and is held by the Auckland War Memorial Museum.

== Distribution ==
This extinct marine species occurs in late Oligocene and early Miocene strata of the Port Phillip Basin, including the Jan Juc Formation and Puebla Formation of Victoria, Australia.
