= Paraguraleus lucidus =

Scientific classification
- Kingdom: Animalia
- Phylum: Mollusca
- Class: Gastropoda
- Subclass: Caenogastropoda
- Order: Neogastropoda
- Superfamily: Conoidea
- Family: Mangeliidae
- Genus: Paraguraleus
- Species: P. lucidus

Binomial name
- Paraguraleus lucidus Laseron, 1954

Synonyms
- Antiguraleus lucidus (Laseron, 1954) (original combination)

Species of gastropod

Paraguraleus lucidus is a species of sea snail, a marine gastropod mollusk in the family Mangeliidae.

== Distribution ==
This marine species occurs off Queensland, Australia and New South Wales, Australia.
