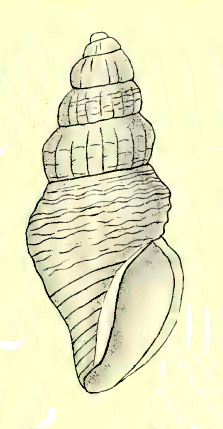
- Original image of a shell of Antiguraleus mundus

Scientific classification
- Kingdom: Animalia
- Phylum: Mollusca
- Class: Gastropoda
- Subclass: Caenogastropoda
- Order: Neogastropoda
- Superfamily: Conoidea
- Family: Mangeliidae
- Genus: Antiguraleus
- Species: A. mundus

Binomial name
- Antiguraleus mundus (Suter, 1909)

Synonyms
- Antiguraleus munda [sic] (incorrect gender ending); Mangilia munda Suter, 1909 (not E.A. Smith, 1888) (original combination); Propebela munda (Suter, 1909)

= Antiguraleus mundus =

Species of gastropod

Antiguraleus mundus is a species of sea snail, a marine gastropod mollusc in the family Mangeliidae.

== Description ==
The length of the shell attains 7.5 mm, its diameter 3.2 mm.

(Original description) The small shell has an elongate-fusiform shape. It is thin and fragile, white, turreted, axially costate and spirally striated. The sculpture consistis of narrowly rounded, slightly oblique axial riblets, about 16 on the body whorl, nearly continuous over the whorls, obsolete on the base. The interstices are slightly broader than the riblets. They are crossed by spiral threads,4 fine and close together on the shoulder, 1 on the carina of the whorl, and 3 below it, the uppermost of these at some distance from the keel. The crossing-points are produced into small oval gemmules. The base is spirally striate, all the striae in front of the aperture being smooth. The colour of the shell is white. The spire is elevated conic, turriculate, nearly 1½ times the height of the aperture. The protoconch is globular, of 1½ smooth whorls, the nucleus broadly rounded. The shell contains 6 whorls, regularly increasing, with a high sloping shoulder, the keel on the spire-whorls near the middle, flat above and below the keel. The base of the shell is contracted. The suture is somewhat impressed, lightly margined below. The aperture is pyriform, broadly angled above, with a short, broad, oblique, and truncated siphonal canal below. The outer lip is convex, thickened by an axial rib, slightly angled above, and somewhat contracted below, with a shallow broad sinus at the suture. The columella is slightly oblique, lightly excavated towards the straight parietal wall, curved below, and extending to the left margin of the siphonal canal. The inner lip is thin, narrow and smooth.

== Distribution ==
This marine species occurs off North Island, off Flat Point, New Zealand, at a depth of 195 m.
