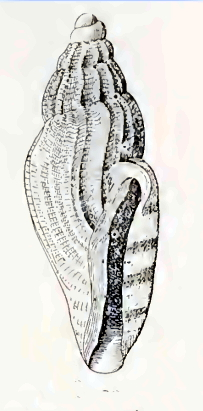
- Original image of a shell of Paraguraleus emina

Scientific classification
- Kingdom: Animalia
- Phylum: Mollusca
- Class: Gastropoda
- Subclass: Caenogastropoda
- Order: Neogastropoda
- Superfamily: Conoidea
- Family: Mangeliidae
- Genus: Paraguraleus
- Species: P. emina

Binomial name
- Paraguraleus emina (Hedley, 1905)

Synonyms
- Antiguraleus emina (Hedley, 1905); Guraleus kingensis var. emina (Hedley, 1905); Mangelia emina Hedley, 1905 (original combination)

= Paraguraleus emina =

Species of gastropod

Paraguraleus emina is a species of sea snail, a marine gastropod mollusk in the family Mangeliidae.

== Description ==
The length of the shell attains 11 mm, its diameter 4.5 mm.

(Original description) The shell has a fusiform shape. It is variable in contour, colour, and development of sculpture. It contains 5½ whorls, including a two-whorled protoconch, rapidly increasing and slightly shouldered. The protoconch is smooth, glassy and globose. The colour of the shell is variable; sometimes entirely drab or buff, often with the protoconch and the subsutural space darker. The example figured has a ground colour of pale cinnamon, banded or spotted with pale cream, below the suture a band of chocolate, deep within the inner lip a tinge of purple, protoconch a clear hazel-brown. The sculpture, longitudinal wave ribs sharply bent near the suture, fading away on the base, and leaving a bare space behind the aperture, wider spaced above, more crowded and irregular below. On the body whorl are fourteen, on the penultimate whorl eighteen. Both ribs and interspaces are crossed by sharp, minute, close, waved, spiral grooves. The flat-topped interspaces of these grooves, four times their width, are again cross-cut by close minute furrows into oblong beads. The aperture is narrow, three-fifths of the shell's length, fortified without by a broad but low incurving varix, which rises above the suture, enclosing a shallow sinus. A layer of callus overspreads the inner lip. The siphonal canal is short and broad.

== Distribution ==
This marine species is endemic to Australia and occurs off New South Wales, Australia.
