= Abacetus aeneus =

Scientific classification
- Kingdom: Animalia
- Phylum: Arthropoda
- Class: Insecta
- Order: Coleoptera
- Suborder: Adephaga
- Family: Carabidae
- Genus: Abacetus
- Species: A. aeneus

Binomial name
- Abacetus aeneus Dejean, 1828

Synonyms
- Astigis aeneus Dejean, 1828; Astygis aeneus Dejean, 1828; Feronia aenea Dejean, 1828

Species of beetle

Abacetus aeneus is a species of ground beetle in the subfamily Pterostichinae. It was described by the famous French entomologist Pierre François Marie Auguste Dejean in 1828 and is found in Egypt and Cyprus.
