= Antiguraleus subitus =

Scientific classification
- Kingdom: Animalia
- Phylum: Mollusca
- Class: Gastropoda
- Subclass: Caenogastropoda
- Order: Neogastropoda
- Superfamily: Conoidea
- Family: Mangeliidae
- Genus: Antiguraleus
- Species: A. subitus

Binomial name
- Antiguraleus subitus (Laseron, 1954)

Synonyms
- Paraguraleus subitus Laseron, 1954 (original combination)

Species of gastropod

Antiguraleus subitus is a species of sea snail, a marine gastropod mollusk in the family Mangeliidae.

== Distribution ==
This marine species is endemic to Australia and occurs off New South Wales, Australia.
