= 2017 in paleomalacology =

This list, 2017 in paleomalacology, is a list of new taxa of ammonites and other fossil cephalopods, as well as fossil gastropods, bivalves and other molluscs that were described during the year 2017, as well as other significant discoveries and events related to molluscan paleontology occurring in 2017.

== Ammonites ==
=== Research ===
- A study on the relationship between hatchling size and geographical ranges in ammonites, as well as on the relationship between geological duration and geographical ranges of ammonites, is published by Wani (2017).
- A study on the holotype specimen of the Devonian species Ivoites opitzi, aiming to establish whether sclerobionts settled on the specimen during its life and whether they were responsible for the coiling observed in this specimen, is published by Stilkerich, Smrecak & De Baets (2017).
- Goolaerts, Denayer & Mottequin (2017) interpret the fossils of Ellipsocaris dewalquei and Spathiocaris chagrinensis from the Devonian (Frasnian) of Belgium, originally thought to be crustacean shields, as ammonoid anaptychi, and consider the genus Ellipsocaris to be a junior synonym of the genus Sidetes.
- A study on the inner shell structure in several ammonite taxa from the Triassic (Olenekian) of southern Primorye (Russia) and its implications for the phylogenetic relationships of Early Triassic ammonites is published by Smyshlyaeva & Zakharov (2017).
- An 8.5 m long ammonite drag mark with the preserved shell of Subplanites rueppellianus at its end is described from the Solnhofen limestone (Germany) by Lomax et al. (2017).
- A study on the taxonomic status of the perisphinctid genus Hubertoceras from the Middle Jurassic of India is published by Dutta et al. (2017), who interpret Hubertoceras as a junior synonym and microconch of the genus Obtusicostites.
- A study on the occurrences of Albian ammonite fossils and their implications for the biogeography of Albian ammonites is published by Rojas et al. (2017).

=== New taxa ===
Name	Novelty	Status	Authors	Age	Unit	Location	Notes	Images
Aegoceras truemani	Sp. nov	Valid	Faure & Bohain	Early Jurassic (Pliensbachian)		France		
Agathiceras sequaxilirae	Sp. nov	Valid	Zhou	Permian	Nanpanjiang Basin	China		
Akmilleria parahuecoensis	Sp. nov	Valid	Zhou	Permian	Nanpanjiang Basin	China		
Allopharciceras	Gen. et 2 sp. nov	Valid	Bockwinkel, Becker & Aboussalam	Devonian (Givetian)		Morocco	Genus includes new species A. maximum and A. kirchgasseri.	
Ammonitoceras dumasi	Sp. nov	Valid	Delanoy et al.	Early Cretaceous (Aptian)		France	A member of the family Ancyloceratidae.	
Ammonitoceras leiferrasensis	Sp. nov	Valid	Delanoy et al.	Early Cretaceous (Aptian)		France	A member of the family Ancyloceratidae.	
Ammonitoceras madouxi	Sp. nov	Valid	Delanoy et al.	Early Cretaceous (Aptian)		France	A member of the family Ancyloceratidae.	
Arctoceras erebori	Sp. nov	Valid	Piazza in Piazza, Hammer & Jattiot	Early Triassic	Vikinghøgda Formation	Norway		
Aristoceras liuzhaiense	Sp. nov	Valid	Zhou	Permian	Nanpanjiang Basin	China		
Balticeras samsonowiczi	Sp. nov	Valid	Wierzbowski	Late Jurassic (Kimmeridgian)	Burzenin Formation	Poland		
Bamyaniceras nandanense	Sp. nov	Valid	Zhou	Permian	Nanpanjiang Basin	China		
Bamyaniceras yangchangense	Sp. nov	Valid	Zhou	Permian	Nanpanjiang Basin	China		
Biloclymenia australis	Sp. nov	Valid	Korn et al.	Devonian (Famennian)		Algeria		
Binelliceras michalíki	Sp. nov	Valid	Vašíček & Malek	Early Cretaceous (Hauterivian)		Slovakia		
Brainaella	Gen. et sp. nov	Valid	Frau, Bulot & Delanoy	Early Cretaceous (Aptian)		France	A member of the family Acrioceratidae. The type species is B. marcoulinense.	
Bransonoceras longyinense	Sp. nov	Valid	Zhou	Permian	Nanpanjiang Basin	China		
Calycoceras (Newboldiceras) algeriense	Sp. nov	Valid	Kennedy & Gale	Late Cretaceous (Cenomanian)	Fahdene Formation	Algeria		
Caseyites	Gen. et 3 sp. nov	Valid	Delanoy et al.	Early Cretaceous (Aptian)		France	A member of the family Ancyloceratidae. The type species is C. esteronensis; genus also includes new species C. vermeuleni and C. morenobedmari, possibly also "Epancyloceras" fractum Casey (1960) and "Pseudocrioceras" orbignyanum Ropolo et al. (1998), non Matheron (1842).	
Caspianites ragazziae	Sp. nov	Valid	Delanoy et al.	Early Cretaceous (Aptian)		France	A member of the family Ancyloceratidae.	
Colombiceras hiratai	Sp. nov	Valid	Matsukawa	Early Cretaceous (Aptian)	Wada Formation	Japan	A member of the subfamily Acanthohoplitinae.	
Craspedites (Craspedites) praeokensis	Sp. nov	Valid	Rogov	Late Jurassic		Norway; Russia		
Craspedites (Trautscholdiceras) transitionis	Sp. nov	Valid	Rogov	Late Jurassic		Russia		
Cyrtoclymenia nodifera	Sp. nov	Valid	Korn et al.	Devonian (Famennian)		Algeria		
Difuntites furnishi	Sp. nov	Valid	Zhou	Permian	Nanpanjiang Basin	China		
Dombarites clemens	Sp. nov	Valid	Nikolaeva & Konovalova	Carboniferous (Mississippian)		Russia		
Dorsomorphites	Gen. et comb. nov	Valid	Sarti	Late Jurassic (Tithonian)		Italy	A member of Ataxioceratidae. The type species is D. exornatum (Catullo, 1853); genus also includes D. negrii (Del Campana, 1905), D. bassanii (Del Campana 1905) and D. selectus (Neumayr, 1873).	
Elsaella	Gen. et sp. nov	Junior homonym	Luber et al.	Early Cretaceous (Aptian)	Essaouira-Agadir Basin	Morocco	Genus includes new species E. tiskatinensis. The generic name is preoccupied by Elsaella Alichova (1960).	
Emilites globosus	Sp. nov	Valid	Zhou	Permian	Nanpanjiang Basin	China		
Eoaraxoceras spinosai	Sp. nov	Valid	Zhou	Permian	Nanpanjiang Basin	China		
Eubostrychoceras (Eubostrychoceras) salisburgense	Sp. nov	Valid	Summesberger, Kennedy & Skoumal	Late Cretaceous (Santonian)	Gosau Group	Austria		
Eubostrychoceras valdelaxum	Sp. nov	Valid	Aiba et al.	Late Cretaceous (Campanian)		Japan		
Eumedlicottia kabiensis	Sp. nov	Valid	Zhou	Permian	Nanpanjiang Basin	China		
Exiteloceras (Exiteloceras) densicostatum	Sp. nov	Valid	McLachlan & Haggart	Late Cretaceous (Campanian)	Northumberland Formation	Canada (British Columbia)		
Extropharciceras worki	Sp. nov	Valid	Bockwinkel, Becker & Aboussalam	Devonian (Givetian)		Morocco		
Ferganoceras constrictum	Sp. nov	Valid	Nikolaeva & Konovalova	Carboniferous (Mississippian)		Russia		
Forbesiceras reversum	Sp. nov	Valid	Kennedy & Gale	Late Cretaceous (Cenomanian)	Fahdene Formation	Algeria		
Fusicrimites	Gen. et sp. nov	Valid	Zhou	Permian	Nanpanjiang Basin	China	Genus includes new species F. nanpanjiangensis.	
Glenisterites	Gen. et sp. nov	Valid	Zhou	Permian	Nanpanjiang Basin	China	Genus includes new species G. sidazhaiensis.	
Gonioclymenia ali	Sp. nov	Valid	Korn & Bockwinkel	Devonian (Famennian)		Morocco		
Gonioclymenia asperornata	Sp. nov	Valid	Korn	Late Devonian		Russia		
Gonioclymenia ebbighauseni	Sp. nov	Valid	Korn & Bockwinkel	Devonian (Famennian)		Morocco		
Gonioclymenia facetornata	Sp. nov	Valid	Korn	Late Devonian		Russia		
Gonioclymenia inornata	Sp. nov	Valid	Korn & Bockwinkel	Devonian (Famennian)		Morocco		
Gonioclymenia mediornata	Sp. nov	Valid	Korn	Late Devonian		Russia		
Gonioclymenia parabolica	Sp. nov	Valid	Korn	Late Devonian		Germany		
Gonioclymenia pricei	Sp. nov	Valid	Korn	Late Devonian		Germany		
Gonioclymenia spiniger	Sp. nov	Valid	Korn & Bockwinkel	Devonian (Famennian)		Morocco		
Gonioclymenia wendti	Sp. nov	Valid	Korn & Bockwinkel	Devonian (Famennian)		Morocco		
Gonioclymenia wunderlichi	Sp. nov	Valid	Korn	Late Devonian		Germany		
Hypengonoceras faugeresi	Sp. nov	Valid	Benzaggagh et al.	Early Cretaceous (Albian)	El Mizab Formation	Morocco		
Hypergoniatites kardailovkensis	Sp. nov	Valid	Nikolaeva & Konovalova	Carboniferous (Mississippian)		Russia		
Kachpurites involutus	Sp. nov	Valid	Rogov	Late Jurassic		Russia		
Kachpurites tenuicostatus	Sp. nov	Valid	Rogov	Late Jurassic		Russia		
Kepplerites herscheli	Sp. nov	Valid	Mönnig & Dietl	Middle Jurassic				
Keppleritiana	Gen. et 2 sp. nov	Junior synonym	Mitta	Middle Jurassic (Upper Bajocian)		Russia (Karachay-Cherkessia)	A member of the family Stephanoceratidae belonging to the subfamily Garantianinae. The type species is K. rostovtsevi; genus also includes K. graebensteini. Subsequently, Mitta (2021) considered Keppleritiana to be a junior synonym of Orthogarantiana.	
Linguaclymenia phillipsi	Sp. nov	Valid	Korn et al.	Devonian (Famennian)		Algeria		
Lithancylus bifurcatus	Sp. nov	Valid	Delanoy et al.	Early Cretaceous (Aptian)		France	A member of the family Ancyloceratidae.	
Loyezia	Gen. et sp. et comb. nov	Valid	Leroy et al.	Early Cretaceous		France	A member of the family Crioceratitidae. The type species is L. coluccii; genus also includes L. krenkeli (Sarkar, 1955), L. shankariae (Sarkar, 1955), and L. crimensis (Wiedmann, 1962).	
Malladaites sandovali	Sp. nov	Valid	Dietze et al.	Middle Jurassic (Aalenian)		Italy		
Medioclymenia saourensis	Sp. nov	Valid	Korn et al.	Devonian (Famennian)		Algeria		
Metahoplites postnodosum	Sp. nov	Valid	Vermeulen et al.	Early Cretaceous (Barremian)		France	A member of the family Holcodiscidae. Originally described as a species of Metahoplites, but subsequently transferred to the genus Dimorphodiscus by Vermeulen et al. (2021).	
Metaperrinites shaiwaensis	Sp. nov	Valid	Zhou	Permian	Nanpanjiang Basin	China		
Miklukhoceras guizhouense	Sp. nov	Valid	Zhou	Permian	Nanpanjiang Basin	China		
Mimimitoceras callumbilicum	Sp. nov	Valid	Korn et al.	Devonian (Famennian)		Algeria		
Mimosphinctes karltschanzi	Sp. nov	Valid	Klug	Early Devonian		Morocco		
Muessenbiaergia beniabbesensis	Sp. nov	Valid	Korn et al.	Devonian (Famennian)		Algeria		
Muessenbiaergia ouarouroutensis	Sp. nov	Valid	Korn et al.	Devonian (Famennian)		Algeria		
Muramotoceras costatum	Sp. nov	Valid	Summesberger, Kennedy & Skoumal	Late Cretaceous (Santonian)	Gosau Group	Austria		
Neocrimites guizhouensis	Sp. nov	Valid	Zhou	Permian	Nanpanjiang Basin	China		
Neocrioceras (Neocrioceras) gosaviense	Sp. nov	Valid	Summesberger, Kennedy & Skoumal	Late Cretaceous (Santonian)	Gosau Group	Austria	A member of the family Diplomoceratidae.	
Neopronorites leonovae	Sp. nov	Valid	Zhou	Permian	Nanpanjiang Basin	China		
Nostoceras (Didymoceras?) adrotans	Sp. nov	Valid	McLachlan & Haggart	Late Cretaceous (Campanian)	Northumberland Formation	Canada (British Columbia)		
Oxypharciceras	Gen. et sp. nov	Valid	Bockwinkel, Becker & Aboussalam	Devonian (Givetian)		Morocco	Genus includes new species O. chebbiense.	
Pachyerymnoceras mahipati	Sp. nov	Valid	Jain	Middle Jurassic (Callovian)		India		
Palominoceras	Gen. et comb. nov	Valid	Jattiot & Bucher in Jattiot et al.	Early Triassic	Thaynes Group	United States (Nevada)	A member of the family Xenoceltitidae; a new genus for "Xenodiscus (Xenaspis)" nevadanus Smith (1932).	
Parahedenstroemia petkovici	Sp. nov	Valid	Đaković	Early Triassic		Montenegro	A member of the family Hedenstroemiidae.	
Parasteroceras beniderkouli	Sp. nov	Valid	Dommergues & Meister	Early Jurassic		Morocco	A member of the family Arietitidae belonging to the subfamily Asteroceratinae.	
Pharciceras concurrens	Sp. nov	Valid	Bockwinkel, Becker & Aboussalam	Devonian (Givetian)		Morocco		
Pharciceras elevatum	Sp. nov	Valid	Bockwinkel, Becker & Aboussalam	Devonian (Givetian)		Morocco		
Popanoceras ziyunense	Sp. nov	Valid	Zhou	Permian	Nanpanjiang Basin	China		
Proaustraliceras bournaudi	Sp. nov	Valid	Delanoy et al.	Early Cretaceous (Aptian)		France	A member of the family Ancyloceratidae.	
Properrinites gigantus	Sp. nov	Valid	Zhou	Permian	Nanpanjiang Basin	China		
Pseudoflemingites martellii	Sp. nov	Valid	Đaković	Early Triassic		Montenegro	A member of Ceratitida belonging to the group Meekocerataceae and the family Flemingitidae.	
Pseudohaploceras tosaense	Sp. nov	Valid	Matsukawa	Early Cretaceous (Aptian)	Wada Formation	Japan	A member of the family Desmoceratidae.	
Pseudolioceras (Paratugurites)	Sub gen. et sp. nov	Valid	Repin	Middle Jurassic (Aalenian)		Russia	The type species of the subgenus is Pseudolioceras (Paratugurites) ochoticum.	
Pseudolioceras (Pontolioceras)	Sub gen. et sp. nov	Valid	Repin	Middle Jurassic (Aalenian)		Russia	The type species of the subgenus is Pseudolioceras (Pontolioceras) pontoneicum.	
Pseudolioceras (Pseudolioceras) beyrichi orientale	Subsp. nov		Repin	Middle Jurassic (Aalenian)		Russia		
Pseudolioceras (Pseudolioceras) kegaliense	Sp. nov		Repin	Middle Jurassic		Russia		
Pseudolioceras (Pseudolioceras) motortschunense	Sp. nov	Valid	Repin	Early Jurassic (Toarcian)		Russia		
Pseudolioceras (Pseudolioceras) parakedonense	Sp. nov		Repin	Early Jurassic (Toarcian)		Russia		
Pseudolioceras (Pseudolioceras) planum	Sp. nov	Valid	Repin	Early Jurassic (Toarcian)		Russia		
Pseudolioceras (Pseudolioceras) rosenkrantzi startense	Subsp. nov	Valid	Repin	Early Jurassic (Toarcian)		Russia		
Pseudolioceras (Pseudolioceras) rosenkrantzi transiens	Subsp. nov	Valid	Repin	Early Jurassic (Toarcian)		Russia		
Pseudopallasiceras	Gen. et comb. nov	Valid	Sarti	Late Jurassic (Tithonian)		Italy	A member of Ataxioceratidae. The type species is "Subplanitoides" mediterraneus Cecca (1990); genus also includes P. toucasi (Cecca & Enay, 1991) and possibly P? pouzinensis (Toucas, 1890).	
?Pseudosageceras bullatum	Sp. nov	Valid	Jattiot & Bucher in Jattiot et al.	Early Triassic	Thaynes Group	United States (Nevada)	A member of the family Hedenstroemiidae.	
Pseudosubplanitoides	Gen. et comb. nov	Valid	Sarti	Late Jurassic (Tithonian)		Italy	A member of Ataxioceratidae. The type species is "Usseliceras (Subplanitoides)" apenninicum Cecca (1990); genus also includes P. pseudocontiguus (Donze & Enay, 1961 in Cecca, 1990), P. schwertschlageri (Zeiss, 1968), P. oppeli (Zeiss, 1968) and P. spindelense (Zeiss, 1968).	
Pseudoteloceras digbyi	Sp. nov	Valid	Chandler, Dietze & Whicher	Middle Jurassic (early Bajocian)		United Kingdom	A member of the family Stephanoceratidae.	
Radioceras? tabulatum	Sp. nov	Valid	Đaković	Early Triassic		Montenegro	A member of Ceratitida belonging to the group Meekocerataceae and the family Gyronitidae.	
Rarecostites kyafarensis	Sp. nov	Valid	Mitta	Middle Jurassic (Bajocian)		Russia (Karachay-Cherkessia)	A member of the family Parkinsoniidae.	
Rarecostites sherstyukovi	Sp. nov	Valid	Mitta	Middle Jurassic (Bajocian)		Russia (Karachay-Cherkessia)	A member of the family Parkinsoniidae.	
Rasenioides glazeki	Sp. nov	Valid	Wierzbowski	Late Jurassic (Kimmeridgian)	Burzenin Formation	Poland	A member of the family Aulacostephanidae.	
Solenoceras exornatus	Sp. nov	Valid	McLachlan & Haggart	Late Cretaceous (Campanian)	Northumberland Formation	Canada (British Columbia)		
Spathites (Jeanrogericeras) asflaensis	Sp. nov	Valid	Meister et al.	Late Cretaceous (Early Turonian)		Morocco		
Stacheoceras shaiwaense	Sp. nov	Valid	Zhou	Permian	Nanpanjiang Basin	China		
Subanarcestes aristanensis	Sp. nov	Valid	Nikolaeva in Nikolaeva et al.	Devonian (Eifelian)		Uzbekistan		
Svetlanoceras uraloceraformis	Sp. nov	Valid	Zhou	Permian	Nanpanjiang Basin	China		
Synartinskia meyaoense	Sp. nov	Valid	Zhou	Permian	Nanpanjiang Basin	China		
Uptonia atlantica	Sp. nov	Valid	Faure & Bohain	Early Jurassic (Pliensbachian)		France		
Virgatites rarecostatus	Sp. nov	Valid	Rogov	Late Jurassic		Kazakhstan; Russia		
Virgatomorphites	Gen. et sp. nov	Valid	Sarti	Late Jurassic (Tithonian)	Rosso Ammonitico Veronese Formation	Italy	A member of Ataxioceratidae. The type species is V. pseudorothpletzi.	
Xenosphinctes	Gen. et sp. nov	Valid	Scherzinger & Schweigert	Late Jurassic (Tithonian)	Hangende-Bankkalke Formation	Germany	A member of the family Ataxioceratidae. The type species is X. berkai.	

== Other cephalopods ==
=== Research ===
- A study on the phylogeny and timing of cephalopod (especially coleoid) evolution is published by Tanner et al. (2017).
- A cephalopod beak assigned to an unnamed shelled coleoid of a so far unknown high-level taxonomic group, displaying significant similarity to the lower beak of the vampire squid, is described from the Carboniferous (late Viséan) Moorefield Formation (Arkansas, United States) by Doguzhaeva & Mapes (2017).
- A study on the global diversity of cephalopods during the early Late Cretaceous is published by Yacobucci (2017).

=== New taxa ===
Name	Novelty	Status	Authors	Age	Unit	Location	Notes	Images
Anglonautilus praeundulatus	Sp. nov	Valid	Lehmann et al.	Early Cretaceous (Hauterivian to Aptian)		France; Spain	A member of Cymatoceratidae.	
Antarcticeras	Gen. et sp. nov	Valid	Doguzhaeva in Doguzhaeva et al.	Eocene (Ypresian)	La Meseta Formation	Antarctica (Seymour Island)	A straight-shelled cephalopod of uncertain phylogenetic placement. Doguzhaeva et al. (2017) assigned it to the new subclass Paracoleoidea and the new order Antarcticerida; Fuchs, Keupp & Klug (2018) considered it to be a member of the subclass Coleoidea and a possible squid. The type species is A. nordenskjoeldi.	
Arionoceras mahsuri	Sp. nov	Valid	Niko, Sone & Leman	Silurian (late Přídolí)	Upper Setul Limestone	Malaysia		
Beloitoceras cautis	Sp. nov	Valid	Kröger & Aubrechtová	Ordovician (Sandbian)	Vasalemma Formation	Estonia		
Boggyoceras	Gen. et sp. nov	Valid	Mutvei	Carboniferous	Boggy Formation	United States (Oklahoma)	A nautiloid cephalopod belonging to the new order Mixosiphonata. Genus includes new species B. centrale.	
Brevibelus rauroaensis	Sp. nov	Valid	Challinor & Hudson	Middle Jurassic		New Zealand	A belemnite.	
Calabribelus combemoreli	Sp. nov	Valid	Weis, Sadki & Mariotti	Middle Jurassic		Morocco	A belemnite.	
Caliceras mempelamense	Sp. nov	Valid	Niko, Sone & Leman	Silurian (late Přídolí)	Upper Setul Limestone	Malaysia	A member of Orthocerida.	
Chuvashiteuthis	Gen. et sp. nov	Valid	Ippolitov & Berezin in Ippolitov et al.	Late Jurassic (Kimmeridgian)		Russia (Chuvashia)	A belemnite belonging to the family Megateuthididae. The type species is C. aenigmatica.	
Curtoceras abditus	Sp. nov	Valid	Kröger & Aubrechtová	Ordovician (Sandbian)	Vasalemma Formation	Estonia		
Dicoelites paraohangaensis	Sp. nov	Valid	Challinor & Hudson	Middle Jurassic (Callovian)		New Zealand	A belemnite.	
Dicoelites spellmanorum	Sp. nov	Valid	Challinor & Hudson	Middle Jurassic (Callovian)		New Zealand	A belemnite.	
Eobelemnopsis	Gen. et sp. et comb. nov	Valid	Challinor & Hudson	Early to Middle Jurassic (late Toarcian to Bajocian-Bathonian)		New Zealand	A belemnite. Genus includes new species E. robustus, as well as "Belemnopsis" mackayi Stevens (1965).	
Hastateuthis	Gen. et sp. nov	Valid	Challinor & Hudson	Jurassic		New Zealand	A belemnite. Genus includes new species H. otagoensis.	
Hemibeloitoceras arduum	Sp. nov	Valid	Kröger & Aubrechtová	Ordovician (Sandbian)	Vasalemma Formation	Estonia		
Hemibeloitoceras molis	Sp. nov	Valid	Kröger & Aubrechtová	Ordovician (Sandbian)	Vasalemma Formation	Estonia		
Hibolithes herangiensis	Sp. nov	Valid	Challinor & Hudson	Middle Jurassic		New Zealand	A belemnite.	
Hibolithes opuatiaensis	Sp. nov	Valid	Challinor & Hudson	Middle Jurassic		New Zealand	A belemnite.	
Hibolithes patriciae	Sp. nov	Valid	Challinor & Hudson	Middle Jurassic		New Zealand	A belemnite.	
Hoeloceras muroni	Sp. nov	Valid	Kröger & Aubrechtová	Ordovician (Sandbian)	Vasalemma Formation	Estonia		
Isorthoceras cavi	Sp. nov	Valid	Kröger & Aubrechtová	Ordovician (Sandbian)	Vasalemma Formation	Estonia		
Isorthoceras maris	Sp. nov	Valid	Kröger & Aubrechtová	Ordovician (Sandbian)	Vasalemma Formation	Estonia		
Isorthoceras padisense	Sp. nov	Valid	Kröger & Aubrechtová	Ordovician (Sandbian)	Vasalemma Formation	Estonia		
Isorthoceras vexilli	Sp. nov	Valid	Kröger & Aubrechtová	Ordovician (Sandbian)	Vasalemma Formation	Estonia		
Kopaninoceras setulense	Sp. nov	Valid	Niko, Sone & Leman	Silurian (late Přídolí)	Upper Setul Limestone	Malaysia	A member of Orthocerida.	
Lituites evolutus	Sp. nov	Valid	Fang, Chen & Zhang in Fang et al.	Ordovician	Datianba Formation	China		
Mimogeisonoceras? langgunense	Sp. nov	Valid	Niko, Sone & Leman	Silurian (late Přídolí)	Upper Setul Limestone	Malaysia	A member of Orthocerida.	
Ordogeisonoceras tartuensis	Sp. nov	Valid	Kröger & Aubrechtová	Ordovician (Sandbian)	Vasalemma Formation	Estonia		
Orthonybyoceras isakari	Sp. nov	Valid	Kröger & Aubrechtová	Ordovician (Sandbian)	Vasalemma Formation	Estonia		
Orthonybyoceras moisense	Sp. nov	Valid	Kröger & Aubrechtová	Ordovician (Sandbian)	Vasalemma Formation	Estonia		
Pachybelemnopsis gribbonensis	Sp. nov	Valid	Challinor & Hudson	Middle Jurassic		New Zealand	A belemnite.	
Peripetoceras kummeli	Sp. nov	Valid	Niko & Mapes	Carboniferous (Serpukhovian)	Imo Formation	United States (Arkansas)		
Pleurorthoceras organi	Sp. nov	Valid	Kröger & Aubrechtová	Ordovician (Sandbian)	Vasalemma Formation	Estonia		
Rummoceras	Gen. et sp. nov	Valid	Kröger & Aubrechtová	Ordovician (Sandbian)	Vasalemma Formation	Estonia	Genus includes new species R. rummuensis.	
Trocholites gennadii	Sp. nov	Valid	Kröger & Aubrechtová	Ordovician (Sandbian)	Vasalemma Formation	Estonia		

== Gastropods ==
Name	Novelty	Status	Authors	Age	Unit	Location	Notes	Images
Afrollonia vilcassina	Sp. nov	Valid	Pacaud	Paleocene		France	A member of the family Turbinidae.	
Alvania alfredbelli	Nom. nov	Valid	Faber	Eocene	Hampshire Basin	United Kingdom	A species of Alvania; a replacement name for Alvania belli Glibert (1962).	
Alycaeus sonlaensis	Sp. nov	Valid	Raheem & Schneider in Raheem et al.	Miocene (Aquitanian)	Hang Mon Formation	Vietnam	A species of Alycaeus.	
Amblyacrum adrienpeyroti	Sp. nov	Valid	Lozouet	Oligocene (Chattian)		France	A member of the family Mangeliidae.	
Amblyacrum otites	Sp. nov	Valid	Lozouet	Oligocene (Chattian)		France	A member of the family Mangeliidae.	
Amblyacrum tauziedensis	Sp. nov	Valid	Lozouet	Oligocene (Chattian)		France	A member of the family Mangeliidae.	
Amphitrochus? gerberi	Sp. nov	Valid	Gründel, Keupp & Lang	Late Jurassic (Kimmeridgian)		Germany	A member of the family Nododelphinulidae. Originally tentatively assigned to the genus Amphitrochus; subsequently transferred to the genus Serrettella by Gründel & Nützel (2024).	
Amphitrochus muensteri	Nom. nov	Valid	Gründel, Keupp & Lang	Late Jurassic (Kimmeridgian)		Germany	A member of the family Nododelphinulidae; a replacement name for "Trochus" binodosus Münster in Goldfuss (1844).	
Anachis milleti	Sp. nov	Valid	Van Dingenen, Ceulemans & Landau	Pliocene (Zanclean)		France	A species of Anachis.	
Anatoma redoniana	Sp. nov	Valid	Landau, Van Dingenen & Ceulemans	Late Miocene		France	A species of Anatoma.	
Angaria (s.str.) proviliacensis	Sp. nov	Valid	Pacaud	Paleocene		France	A species of Angaria.	
Asthenotoma angusta	Sp. nov	Valid	Lozouet	Early Miocene		France	A species of Asthenotoma.	
Asthenotoma praepannus	Sp. nov	Valid	Lozouet	Oligocene (Chattian)		France	A species of Asthenotoma.	
Asthenotoma vulcani	Sp. nov	Valid	Lozouet	Oligocene (Chattian)		France	A species of Asthenotoma.	
Astrangaria	Gen. et comb. nov	Valid	Pacaud	Paleocene (Danian)		Belgium; Russia; France	A member of Angariidae; a new genus for "Angarina" spinosa Briart & Cornet (1887).	
Atactolaoma	Gen. et sp. nov	Valid	Marshall & Worthy	Miocene		New Zealand	A member of Punctidae. The type species is A. miocenica.	
Ataxocerithium biaulax	Sp. nov	Valid	Darragh	Late Eocene	Pallinup Formation	Australia	A species of Ataxocerithium.	
Ataxocerithium multicostulatum	Sp. nov	Valid	Darragh	Late Eocene	Pallinup Formation	Australia	A species of Ataxocerithium.	
Ataxocerithium otopleuroides	Sp. nov	Valid	Darragh	Late Eocene	Pallinup Formation	Australia	A species of Ataxocerithium.	
Ataxocerithium venustulum	Sp. nov	Valid	Darragh	Late Eocene	Pallinup Formation	Australia	A species of Ataxocerithium.	
Atoma ambiguiformis	Sp. nov	Valid	Lozouet	Oligocene (Chattian)		France	A member of the family Horaiclavidae.	
Atoma buccinoides	Sp. nov	Valid	Lozouet	Oligocene (Chattian)		France	A member of the family Horaiclavidae.	
Attiliosa arenaria	Sp. nov	Valid	Darragh	Late Eocene	Pallinup Formation	Australia	A species of Attiliosa.	
Bartschia (Agassitula) harasewychi	Sp. nov	Valid	Van Dingenen, Ceulemans & Landau	Pliocene (Zanclean)		France	A species of Bartschia.	
Bathytoma lanotensis	Sp. nov	Valid	Lozouet	Oligocene (Chattian)		France	A species of Bathytoma.	
Belloliva canaliculata	Sp. nov	Valid	Darragh	Late Eocene	Pallinup Formation	Australia	A species of Belloliva.	
Benthomangelia praegrateloupi	Sp. nov	Valid	Lozouet	Oligocene (Chattian)		France	A species of Benthomangelia	
Bithynia abbatiae	Sp. nov	Valid	Esu & Girotti	Early Pliocene		Italy	A species of Bithynia.	
Boettgeriola denticulata	Sp. nov	Valid	Lozouet	Oligocene (Chattian)		France	A member of the family Borsoniidae.	
Boettgeriola granulosa	Sp. nov	Valid	Lozouet	Oligocene (Chattian)		France	A member of the family Borsoniidae.	
Boettgeriola protoglobosa	Sp. nov	Valid	Lozouet	Oligocene (Chattian)		France	A member of the family Borsoniidae.	
Boreodrillia megacarinata	Sp. nov	Valid	Lozouet	Oligocene (Chattian)		France	A member of the family Horaiclavidae.	
Boreodrillia orthensis	Sp. nov	Valid	Lozouet	Oligocene (Chattian)		France	A member of the family Horaiclavidae.	
Boreodrillia paulensis	Sp. nov	Valid	Lozouet	Oligocene (Chattian)		France	A member of the family Horaiclavidae.	
Boreodrillia pseudoaturensis	Sp. nov	Valid	Lozouet	Oligocene (Chattian)		France	A member of the family Horaiclavidae.	
Boreodrillia pygmaea	Sp. nov	Valid	Lozouet	Oligocene (Chattian)		France	A member of the family Horaiclavidae.	
Boreodrillia sibuzatensis	Sp. nov	Valid	Lozouet	Oligocene (Chattian)		France	A member of the family Horaiclavidae.	
Boreomica	Gen. et comb. et subsp. nov	Valid	Guzhov	Middle Jurassic to Early Cretaceous		France; Germany; Poland; Russia	A member of the family Rissoidae. The type species is "Rissoina" exigua Gerasimov (1992), including new subspecies B. exigua arenosa; genus also includes B. caleptra (Gründel, 1975), B. undulata (Tullberg, 1881), B. recta (Destombes, 1983) and possibly "Hudlestoniella" pura Gründel (1975).	
Borsonia (Cordieria) meridionalis	Sp. nov	Valid	Lozouet	Oligocene (Chattian)		France	A species of Borsonia.	
Bralitzia alternabilis	Sp. nov	Valid	Guzhov & Shapovalov in Guzhov	Late Jurassic		Russia	A member of the family Rissoidae.	
Bralitzia minigibba	Sp. nov	Valid	Guzhov, Liapin & Shapovalov in Guzhov	Jurassic (late Callovian – early Oxfordian)		Russia	A member of the family Rissoidae.	
Bralitzia ? vitiosa	Sp. nov	Valid	Guzhov & Shapovalov in Guzhov	Late Jurassic		Russia	A member of the family Rissoidae.	
Brocchinia pigeonblancensis	Sp. nov	Valid	Van Dingenen, Ceulemans & Landau	Pliocene (Zanclean)		France	A species of Brocchinia.	
Buvignieria gruendeli	Sp. nov	Valid	Guzhov	Jurassic		Russia	A member of the family Rissoidae.	
Calliostoma biangulatum	Nom. nov	Valid	Landau, Van Dingenen & Ceulemans	Late Miocene		France	A species of Calliostoma; a replacement name for Trochus heliciformis Millet (1865).	
Calliostoma gibbuliforme	Sp. nov	Valid	Landau, Van Dingenen & Ceulemans	Late Miocene		France	A species of Calliostoma.	
Calliostoma irerense	Sp. nov	Valid	Harzhauser in Harzhauser et al.	Miocene (Burdigalian)	Band-e-Chaker Formation	Iran	A species of Calliostoma.	
Calliostoma lamellatum	Sp. nov	Valid	Landau, Van Dingenen & Ceulemans	Late Miocene		France	A species of Calliostoma.	
Calliostoma lesporti	Nom. nov	Valid	Pacaud	Paleogene		France	A species of Calliostoma.	
Calliostoma michaeli	Sp. nov	Valid	Landau, Van Dingenen & Ceulemans	Late Miocene		France	A species of Calliostoma.	
Calliostoma microgemmatum	Sp. nov	Valid	Landau, Van Dingenen & Ceulemans	Late Miocene		France	A species of Calliostoma.	
Calliostoma milletigranum	Nom. nov	Valid	Landau, Van Dingenen & Ceulemans	Late Miocene		France	A species of Calliostoma; a replacement name for Trochus millegranus Millet (1864).	
Calliostoma miotorulosum	Nom. nov	Valid	Landau, Van Dingenen & Ceulemans	Late Miocene		France	A species of Calliostoma; a replacement name for Trochus torulosus Millet (1865).	
Calliostoma miotumidum	Nom. nov	Valid	Landau, Van Dingenen & Ceulemans	Late Miocene		France	A species of Calliostoma; a replacement name for Trochus tumidus Millet (1865).	
Calliostoma mohtatae	Sp. nov	Valid	Harzhauser in Harzhauser et al.	Miocene (Burdigalian)	Band-e-Chaker Formation	Iran	A species of Calliostoma.	
Calliostoma presselierense	Sp. nov	Valid	Landau, Van Dingenen & Ceulemans	Late Miocene		France	A species of Calliostoma.	
Calliostoma quaggaoides	Sp. nov	Valid	Landau, Van Dingenen & Ceulemans	Late Miocene		France	A species of Calliostoma.	
Calliostoma spinosum	Sp. nov	Valid	Landau, Van Dingenen & Ceulemans	Late Miocene		France	A species of Calliostoma.	
Calliostoma verrucosum	Sp. nov	Valid	Landau, Van Dingenen & Ceulemans	Late Miocene		France	A species of Calliostoma.	
Calliotropis (Riselloidea) ligosta	Sp. nov	Valid	Cataldo	Early Cretaceous		Argentina	A species of Calliotropis.	
Caryomphalus	Gen. et comb. et sp. nov	Valid	Gründel, Keupp & Lang	Late Jurassic (Kimmeridgian)		Germany	A member of Vetigastropoda belonging to the family Metriomphalidae. The type species is "Delphinula" funata-plicosa Quenstedt (1858); genus also includes new species C. concavus.	
Cassis (Morionella) lelongi	Sp. nov	Valid	Gain, Belliard & Le Renard	Eocene		France	A species of Cassis.	
Cassis (Morionella) nigellensis	Sp. nov	Valid	Gain, Belliard & Le Renard	Eocene		France	A species of Cassis.	
Cassis (Morionella) parfouruorum	Sp. nov	Valid	Gain, Belliard & Le Renard	Eocene		France	A species of Cassis.	
Cataldia? binodosa	Sp. nov	Valid	Cataldo	Early Cretaceous		Argentina		
Cavellia jenniferae	Sp. nov	Valid	Marshall & Worthy	Miocene		New Zealand	A member of Charopidae.	
Cerithiella limula	Sp. nov	Valid	Darragh	Late Eocene	Pallinup Formation	Australia	A species of Cerithiella.	
Cerithiopsis pustuloclathrata	Sp. nov	Valid	Darragh	Late Eocene	Pallinup Formation	Australia	A species of Cerithiopsis.	
Ceritoturris littoralis	Sp. nov	Valid	Lozouet	Oligocene (Chattian)		France	A species of Ceritoturris.	
Ceritoturris philippei	Sp. nov	Valid	Lozouet	Early Miocene		France	A species of Ceritoturris.	
Charopa manuherikia	Sp. nov	Valid	Marshall & Worthy	Miocene		New Zealand	A species of Charopa.	
Chauvetia chirlii	Sp. nov	Valid	Brunetti, Della Bella & Cresti	Pliocene		Italy	A species of Chauvetia.	
Chauvetia plioetrusca	Sp. nov	Valid	Brunetti, Della Bella & Cresti	Pliocene		Italy	A species of Chauvetia.	
Chauvetia pliorobusta	Sp. nov	Valid	Brunetti, Della Bella & Cresti	Pliocene		Italy	A species of Chauvetia.	
Chauvetia sossoi	Sp. nov	Valid	Brunetti, Della Bella & Cresti	Pliocene		Italy	A species of Chauvetia.	
Chilodonta haegelei	Sp. nov	Valid	Gründel, Keupp & Lang	Late Jurassic (Kimmeridgian)		Germany	A species of Chilodonta.	
Chilodonta quadratofoveata	Sp. nov	Valid	Gründel, Keupp & Lang	Late Jurassic (Kimmeridgian)		Germany	A species of Chilodonta.	
Cirsocerithium agriorivensis	Sp. nov	Valid	Cataldo	Early Cretaceous		Argentina		
Cirsochilus moucharti	Sp. nov	Valid	Pacaud	Eocene		France	A member of the family Turbinidae.	
Clanculus (Clanculopsis) sancticlementensis	Sp. nov	Valid	Landau, Van Dingenen & Ceulemans	Late Miocene		France	A species of Clanculus.	
Clanculus (Clanculopsis) umbilicovadus	Sp. nov	Valid	Landau, Van Dingenen & Ceulemans	Late Miocene		France	A species of Clanculus.	
Clanculus (Clanculus) brebioni	Sp. nov	Valid	Landau, Van Dingenen & Ceulemans	Late Miocene		France	A species of Clanculus.	
Clavocerithium kendricki	Sp. nov	Valid	Darragh	Late Eocene	Pallinup Formation	Australia	A species of Clavocerithium.	
Cleopatra pakechiensis	Sp. nov	Valid	Musalizi	Late Miocene		Uganda	A species of Cleopatra.	
Coahuilix parrasense	Sp. nov	Valid	Czaja et al.	Holocene		Mexico	A species of Coahuilix. Originally described as a sub-fossil species, but subsequently extant specimens were tentatively assigned to this species as well.	
Collonia (s.str.) naonedensis	Sp. nov	Valid	Pacaud	Eocene		France	A species of Collonia.	
Colpomphalus thuyi	Sp. nov	Valid	Monari, Gatto & Valentini	Middle Jurassic (Bajocian)		Luxembourg	A member of the family Discohelicidae.	
Colpomphalus tigratus	Sp. nov	Valid	Monari, Gatto & Valentini	Middle Jurassic (Bajocian)		Luxembourg	A member of the family Discohelicidae.	
Coluzea cavelieri	Sp. nov	Valid	Gain & Le Renard	Late Eocene		France	Originally described as a species of Coluzea; subsequently transferred to the genus Denticulofusus in the family Columbariidae.	
Coluzea monicae	Sp. nov	Valid	Belliard, Gain & Le Renard	Eocene		France	Originally described as a species of Coluzea; subsequently transferred to the genus Denticulofusus in the family Columbariidae.	
Coluzea tenuistriata	Sp. nov	Valid	Belliard, Gain & Le Renard	Eocene		France	A species of Coluzea.	
Comitas silicicola	Sp. nov	Valid	Darragh	Late Eocene	Pallinup Formation	Australia	A species of Comitas.	
Conomitra strombodiformis	Sp. nov	Valid	Darragh	Late Eocene	Pallinup Formation	Australia	A species of Conomitra.	
Conorbis notialis	Sp. nov	Valid	Darragh	Late Eocene	Pallinup Formation	Australia	A species of Conorbis.	
Cordieria fuscoamnica	Sp. nov	Valid	Darragh	Late Eocene	Browns Creek Formation; Pallinup Formation	Australia	A species of Cordieria.	
Cordieria torquata	Sp. nov	Valid	Darragh	Late Eocene	Pallinup Formation	Australia	A species of Cordieria.	
Costatophora pulcherrima	Sp. nov	Valid	Darragh	Late Eocene	Pallinup Formation	Australia	A member of the family Triphoridae.	
Crassispira octocrassicosta	Sp. nov	Valid	Lozouet	Oligocene (Chattian)		France	A species of Crassispira.	
Crassispira sanctistephani	Sp. nov	Valid	Lozouet	Oligocene (Chattian)		France	A species of Crassispira.	
Crassispira virodunensis	Sp. nov	Valid	Lozouet	Oligocene (Chattian)		France	A species of Crassispira.	
Cryptodaphne chattica	Sp. nov	Valid	Lozouet	Oligocene (Chattian)		France	A species of Cryptodaphne	
Cryptospira hordeastra	Sp. nov	Valid	Darragh	Late Eocene	Pallinup Formation	Australia	A species of Cryptospira.	
Cyclophorus hangmonensis	Sp. nov	Valid	Raheem & Schneider in Raheem et al.	Miocene (Aquitanian)	Hang Mon Formation	Vietnam	A species of Cyclophorus.	
Cylindrobullina brevispira	Sp. nov	Valid	Ferrari	Early Jurassic (Pliensbachian)	Neuquén Basin	Argentina	A member of Acteonoidea belonging to the family Cylindrobullinidae.	
Daphnella gascognensis	Sp. nov	Valid	Lozouet	Early Miocene		France	A species of Daphnella	
Dendropa prisca	Sp. nov	Valid	Marshall & Worthy	Miocene		New Zealand	A member of Charopidae.	
Dermomurex silicatus	Sp. nov	Valid	Darragh	Late Eocene	Pallinup Formation	Australia	A species of Dermomurex.	
Dikoleps insulsa	Sp. nov	Valid	Landau, Van Dingenen & Ceulemans	Late Miocene		France	A species of Dikoleps.	
Diodora sancticlementensis	Sp. nov	Valid	Landau, Van Dingenen & Ceulemans	Late Miocene		France	A species of Diodora.	
Diodora stalennuyi	Sp. nov	Valid	Dell'Angelo et al.	Middle Miocene (late Badenian)		Poland; Ukraine	A species of Diodora.	
Drilliola estotiensis	Sp. nov	Valid	Lozouet	Oligocene (Chattian)		France	A species of Drilliola.	
Drilliola mammicula	Sp. nov	Valid	Lozouet	Oligocene (Chattian)		France	A species of Drilliola.	
Drilliola ponticensis	Sp. nov	Valid	Lozouet	Early Miocene		France	A species of Drilliola.	
Drilliola subsedentaria	Sp. nov	Valid	Lozouet	Oligocene (Chattian)		France	A species of Drilliola.	
Entomella parilis	Sp. nov	Valid	Pacaud	Paleocene		France	A member of the family Fissurellidae.	
Eoconus veteratoris	Sp. nov	Valid	Tracey & Craig in Tracey et al.	Eocene (Bartonian-Priabonian)		France	A species of Eoconus.	
Eratoidea fusoides	Sp. nov	Valid	Darragh	Late Eocene	Pallinup Formation	Australia	A species of Eratoidea.	
Eucycloidea bitneri	Sp. nov	Valid	Kaim et al.	Latest Jurassic–earliest Cretaceous (late Tithonian–late Berriasian)		Norway	A member of Eucyclidae.	
Euthria palumbina	Sp. nov	Valid	Van Dingenen, Ceulemans & Landau	Pliocene (Zanclean)		France	A species of Euthria.	
Exelissa crassicostata	Sp. nov	Valid	Cataldo	Early Cretaceous		Argentina		
Exilia stechesonae	Sp. nov	Valid	Squires in Squires & Stecheson	Late Cretaceous (Campanian)	Chatsworth Formation; Williams Formation	United States (California)	A species of Exilia.	
Fabercapulus	Gen. et sp. nov	Valid	Monari, Gatto & Valentini	Middle Jurassic (Bajocian)		Luxembourg	A member of the family Symmetrocapulidae. The type species is F. semisculptus.	
Falsotectus	Gen. et sp. nov	Valid	Gründel, Keupp & Lang	Late Jurassic (Kimmeridgian)		Germany	A member of the family Trochidae. The type species is F. parvus.	
Fectola hekyra	Sp. nov	Valid	Marshall & Worthy	Miocene		New Zealand	A member of Charopidae.	
Galeodea (Mambrinia) tetratropis	Sp. nov	Valid	Gain, Belliard & Le Renard	Eocene		France	A species of Galeodea.	
Gemmula antedenticulata	Sp. nov	Valid	Lozouet	Oligocene (Chattian)		France	A species of Gemmula.	
Gemmula brevirostris	Sp. nov	Valid	Lozouet	Oligocene (Chattian)		France	A species of Gemmula.	
Gemmula funiculosa	Sp. nov	Valid	Lozouet	Oligocene (Chattian)		France	A species of Gemmula.	
Gemmula obesa	Sp. nov	Valid	Lozouet	Oligocene (Chattian)		France	A species of Gemmula.	
Gibbula brebioni	Sp. nov	Valid	Landau, Van Dingenen & Ceulemans	Late Miocene		France	A member of the family Trochidae. Originally described as a species of Gibbula, but subsequently transferred to the genus Gibbuliculus.	
Gibbula clanculiforma	Sp. nov	Valid	Landau, Van Dingenen & Ceulemans	Late Miocene		France	A species of Gibbula.	
Gibbula conicomagus	Sp. nov	Valid	Landau, Van Dingenen & Ceulemans	Late Miocene		France	A member of the family Trochidae. Originally described as a species of Gibbula, but subsequently transferred to the genus Gibbuliculus.	
Gibbula marianae	Sp. nov	Valid	Landau, Van Dingenen & Ceulemans	Late Miocene		France	A species of Gibbula.	
Gibbula (Kolesnikoviella)	Subgen. et comb. nov	Valid	Sladkovskaya	Miocene	Dnepropetrovskie–Vasilievskie Beds; Novomoskovskie Beds; Zbruchskie Beds	Kazakhstan; Moldova; Russia; Ukraine	A subgenus of Gibbula. The type species is "Trochus" blainvillei Orbigny (1844); the subgenus also includes "Trochus" subblainvillei Sinzow (1897), "Trochus" papilla Eichwald (1850), "Trochus" urupensis Uspenskaya (1927), "Trochus" anceps Eichwald (1850), "Trochus" adelae Orbigny (1844) and "Trochus" pageanus Orbigny (1844).	
Gibbula (Sarmatigibbula)	Subgen. et comb. nov	Valid	Sladkovskaya	Miocene	Dnepropetrovskie–Vasilievskie Beds; Novomoskovskie Beds; Zbruchskie Beds	Kazakhstan; Moldova; Russia; Ukraine; Romania?	A subgenus of Gibbula. The type species is "Trochus" podolicus Dubois de Montpereux (1831); the subgenus also includes "Trochus" hommairei Orbigny (1844), "Trochus" philippisinzovi Kolesnikov (1930) and "Trochus" woronzowii Orbigny (1844).	
Granulizona	Gen. et sp. nov	Valid	Szabó	Early Jurassic (Sinemurian to Pliensbachian)	Hierlatz Limestone Formation	Austria	Possibly a member of the family Pleurotomariidae. The type species is G. mandli.	
Grovesia prosila	Sp. nov	Valid	Fehse	Eocene		Italy	A member of the family Eocypraeidae.	
Gymnobela cyrillei	Sp. nov	Valid	Lozouet	Oligocene (Chattian)		France	A species of Gymnobela	
Guildfordia ostarrichi	Nom. nov	Valid	Pacaud	Late Cretaceous (Turonian)		Austria	A species of Guildfordia; a replacement name for Delphinula spinosa Zekeli (1852).	
Hadriania olleri	Sp. nov	Valid	Calzada & Moreno	Late Cretaceous (Campanian)		Spain	A species of Hadriania	
Haliotis stalennuyi	Sp. nov	Valid	Owen & Berschauer	Miocene		Ukraine	A species of Haliotis.	
Hastula pseudobasteroti	Sp. nov	Valid	Lozouet	Oligocene (Chattian)		France	A species of Hastula.	
Hastula sublaevissima	Sp. nov	Valid	Lozouet	Oligocene (Chattian)		France	A species of Hastula.	
Heliconoides nikkieae	Sp. nov	Valid	Cotton et al.	Eocene (Priabonian) and Oligocene (Rupelian)	Pande Formation	Tanzania	A member of the family Limacinidae.	
Hemiconus auriculatus	Sp. nov	Valid	Tracey & Craig in Tracey et al.	Late Eocene		France	A species of Hemiconus.	
Hemiconus constantinensis	Sp. nov	Valid	Tracey & Craig in Tracey et al.	Eocene (Lutetian)		France	A species of Hemiconus.	
Hemiconus lateralis	Sp. nov	Valid	Tracey & Craig in Tracey et al.	Eocene (Lutetian)		France	A species of Hemiconus.	
Hemiconus leroyi	Sp. nov	Valid	Tracey & Craig in Tracey et al.	Paleocene (Thanetian)		France	A species of Hemiconus.	
Hemiconus pissarroi	Sp. nov	Valid	Tracey & Craig in Tracey et al.	Eocene (Lutetian)		France	A species of Hemiconus.	
Hemiconus trisulcatus	Sp. nov	Valid	Tracey & Craig in Tracey et al.	Eocene (Lutetian)		France	A species of Hemiconus.	
Hennocquia saalensis	Sp. nov	Valid	Gründel, Keupp & Lang	Late Jurassic (Kimmeridgian)		Germany	A member of the family Acmaeidae.	
Hikidea svalbardensis	Sp. nov	Valid	Kaim et al.	Early Cretaceous (late Berriasian)		Norway	A member of Colloniidae.	
Hudlestoniella hammeri	Sp. nov	Valid	Kaim et al.	Latest Jurassic–earliest Cretaceous (late Tithonian–late Berriasian)		Norway		
Hyalogyrina knorringfjelletensis	Sp. nov	Valid	Kaim et al.	Early Cretaceous (late Berriasian)		Norway	A species of Hyalogyrina.	
Inella dauciformis	Sp. nov	Valid	Darragh	Late Eocene	Pallinup Formation	Australia	A species of Inella.	
Inella moniliferata	Sp. nov	Valid	Darragh	Late Eocene	Pallinup Formation	Australia	A species of Inella.	
Janthina krejcii	Sp. nov	Valid	Beu	Pliocene (Zanclean)		Azores	A species of Janthina.	
Jujubinus coronatus	Sp. nov	Valid	Landau, Van Dingenen & Ceulemans	Late Miocene		France	A species of Jujubinus.	
Jujubinus helenae	Nom. nov	Valid	Pacaud	Eocene		France	A species of Jujubinus; a replacement name for Trochus sulcatus Lamarck (1804).	
Jujubinus redoniensis	Sp. nov	Valid	Landau, Van Dingenen & Ceulemans	Late Miocene		France	A species of Jujubinus.	
Jujubinus sceauxensis	Sp. nov	Valid	Landau, Van Dingenen & Ceulemans	Late Miocene		France	A species of Jujubinus.	
Lanistes depressus	Sp. nov	Valid	Musalizi	Late Miocene		Uganda	A species of Lanistes.	
Lanistes umbilicatus	Sp. nov	Valid	Musalizi	Late Miocene		Uganda	A species of Lanistes.	
Lautoconus harzhauseri	Sp. nov.	Valid	Kovács in Vicián, Krock & Kovács	Middle Miocene	Sámsonháza Formation	Hungary	A species of Lautoconus.	
Leptomaria tuberosa	Sp. nov	Junior synonym	Gründel, Keupp & Lang	Late Jurassic (Kimmeridgian)		Germany	A member of the family Pleurotomariidae. Subsequently considered to be a junior synonym of the species Leptomaria goldfussi (Sieberer, 1907) by Gründel & Nützel (2024).	
Limacina tanzaniaensis	Sp. nov	Valid	Cotton et al.	Eocene (Priabonian)	Pande Formation	Tanzania	A species of Limacina.	
Limacina timi	Sp. nov	Valid	Cotton et al.	Eocene (Priabonian)	Pande Formation	Tanzania	A species of Limacina.	
Liotina (Austroliotia) denudans	Sp. nov	Valid	Gain, Belliard & Le Renard	Eocene	Cotentin Basin	France	A species of Liotina.	
Liotina (Austroliotia) warnii constantinensis	Subsp. nov	Valid	Gain, Belliard & Le Renard	Eocene	Cotentin Basin	France	A subspecies of Liotina warnii.	
Liotina (Austroliotia) warnii intermedia	Subsp. nov	Valid	Gain, Belliard & Le Renard	Eocene	Cotentin Basin	France	A subspecies of Liotina warnii.	
Liotina (Liotina) adamantina elevata	Subsp. nov	Valid	Gain, Belliard & Le Renard	Eocene	Cotentin Basin	France	A subspecies of Liotina adamantina.	
Liotina (Liotina) altavillensis	Sp. nov	Valid	Gain, Belliard & Le Renard	Eocene	Cotentin Basin	France	A species of Liotina.	
Lodderena redferni	Sp. nov	Valid	Landau, Van Dingenen & Ceulemans	Late Miocene		France	A species of Lodderena.	
Lychnus applanatus	Sp. nov		Turin	Late Cretaceous (Maastrichtian)		France	A member of the family Anadromidae.	
Lychnus siruguei	Sp. nov		Turin	Late Cretaceous (Maastrichtian)		France	A member of the family Anadromidae.	
Lymnaea bogatschevi	Sp. nov	Valid	Vinarski & Frolov	Neogene (Khersonian–Maeotian transition)		Russia	A species of Lymnaea.	
Lyosoma truquicoensis	Sp. nov	Valid	Cataldo	Early Cretaceous		Argentina		
Lyria craticulata	Sp. nov	Valid	Darragh	Late Eocene	Pallinup Formation	Australia	A species of Lyria.	
Maghrebiola	Gen. et comb. et sp. nov	Valid	Kadolsky & Hammouda in Hammouda et al.	Eocene	Hamada de Méridja Formation	Algeria	A possible member of Strophocheilidae. The type species is "Clavator (Leucotaenius)" soltanensis Jodot (1938); genus also includes new species M. meridjensis.	
Mastoniaeforis pagodiformis	Sp. nov	Valid	Darragh	Late Eocene	Pallinup Formation	Australia	A member of the family Triphoridae.	
Metriomphalus parvotuberosus	Sp. nov	Valid	Gründel, Keupp & Lang	Late Jurassic (Kimmeridgian)		Germany	A member of Vetigastropoda belonging to the family Metriomphalidae.	
Microdrillia aturensis	Sp. nov	Valid	Lozouet	Oligocene (Chattian)		France	A species of Microdrillia.	
Microschiza weaveri	Sp. nov	Valid	Ferrari	Early Jurassic (Sinemurian and Pliensbachian)	Neuquén Basin	Argentina; Chile	A member of the family Purpurinidae.	
Mioawateria hondelattensis	Sp. nov	Valid	Lozouet	Oligocene (Chattian)		France	A species of Mioawateria	
Naricopsina aequabilis	Sp. nov	Valid	Ferrari	Early Jurassic (Sinemurian to Toarcian)	Neuquén Basin	Argentina	A member of the family Ampullinidae.	
Naricopsina ballentae	Sp. nov	Valid	Ferrari	Early Jurassic (Pliensbachian)	Neuquén Basin	Argentina	A member of the family Ampullinidae.	
Neoguraleus filiferus	Sp. nov	Valid	Darragh	Late Eocene	Pallinup Formation	Australia	A species of Neoguraleus.	
Neophenacohelix eos	Sp. nov	Valid	Marshall & Worthy	Miocene		New Zealand	A member of Charopidae.	
Neorotomaria	Gen. et 2 sp. nov	Valid	Szabó	Early Jurassic (Sinemurian to Pliensbachian)	Hierlatz Limestone Formation	Austria	A member of the family Pleurotomariidae. The type species is N. obertraunensis; genus also includes N. subgradata.	
Neothauma jupadwongaensis	Sp. nov	Valid	Musalizi	Late Miocene		Uganda	A species of Neothauma.	
Neothauma maramaensis	Sp. nov	Valid	Musalizi	Late Miocene		Uganda	A species of Neothauma.	
Neptunea mirabilis	Sp. nov	Valid	Brunetti, Della Bella & Cresti	Pliocene		Italy	A species of Neptunea (sensu lato).	
Nerita craigi	Sp. nov	Valid	Symonds, Gain & Belliard	Eocene	Cotentin Basin	France	A species of Nerita.	
Nerita (Amphinerita) symondsi	Nom. nov	Valid	Pacaud	Eocene		France	A species of Nerita; a replacement name for Nerita maculata Doncieux (1908).	
Neritopsis gedrosiana	Sp. nov	Valid	Harzhauser in Harzhauser et al.	Miocene (Burdigalian)	Band-e-Chaker Formation	Iran	A species of Neritopsis.	
Nipteraxis alonzensis	Sp. nov	Valid	Pacaud	Eocene (Priabonian)		France	A member of Architectonicidae.	
Nitidiclavus oligocaenicus	Sp. nov	Valid	Lozouet	Oligocene (Chattian)		France	A member of the family Drilliidae.	
Nododelphinula magnotuberosa	Sp. nov	Valid	Gründel, Keupp & Lang	Late Jurassic (Kimmeridgian)		Germany	A member of the family Nododelphinulidae.	
Oonia acuta	Sp. nov	Valid	Ferrari	Early Jurassic (Hettangian to Pliensbachian)	Neuquén Basin	Argentina; Chile	A member of the family Ampullinidae.	
Ovaginella arenula	Sp. nov	Valid	Darragh	Late Eocene	Pallinup Formation	Australia	A member of the family Marginellidae.	
Ovaginella mumiformis	Sp. nov	Valid	Darragh	Late Eocene	Pallinup Formation	Australia	A member of the family Marginellidae.	
Palaeoceratia oblonga	Sp. nov	Valid	Guzhov	Late Jurassic		Russia	A member of the family Rissoidae.	
Paludiscala thompsoni	Sp. nov	Valid	Czaja et al.	Holocene		Mexico	A relative of Paludiscala caramba.	
Papilliconus	Gen. et 2 sp. nov	Valid	Tracey & Craig in Tracey et al.	Eocene		France	A member of the family Conidae. The type species is P. papillatus; genus also includes P. radulfivillensis.	
Papillotopsis	Gen. et comb. nov	Valid	Binder	Miocene		Austria; Czech Republic	A member of Helicoidea. The type species is "Helix" robusta Reuss (1849); genus also includes "Helix" richarzi Schlosser (1907) and "Tropidomphalus" rotundus Binder (2004).	
Paralaoma senex	Sp. nov	Valid	Marshall & Worthy	Miocene		New Zealand	A species of Paralaoma.	
Pareuchelus dautzenbergi	Sp. nov	Valid	Landau, Van Dingenen & Ceulemans	Late Miocene		France		
Parviturbo rubioi	Sp. nov	Valid	Landau, Van Dingenen & Ceulemans	Late Miocene		France	A species of Parviturbo.	
?Pectinodonta borealis	Sp. nov	Valid	Kaim et al.	Early Cretaceous (late Berriasian)		Norway	A member of Pectinodontidae.	
Perrona secunda	Sp. nov	Valid	Lozouet	Oligocene (Chattian)		France	A species of Perrona.	
Petrafixia chattica	Sp. nov	Valid	Lozouet	Oligocene (Chattian)		France	A member of the family Mangeliidae.	
Phorcus gallicophorcus	Sp. nov	Valid	Landau, Van Dingenen & Ceulemans	Late Miocene		France	A species of Phorcus.	
Pictavia rothi	Sp. nov	Valid	Ferrari	Early Jurassic (Pliensbachian and Toarcian)	Neuquén Basin	Argentina	A member of the family Ampullinidae.	
Pila busserti	Sp. nov	Valid	Harzhauser & Neubauer in Harzhauser et al.	Paleogene (probably Eocene)	Hudi Chert Formation	Sudan	A species of Pila.	
Pisidium mionicense	Sp. nov	Valid	Neubauer, Harzhauser & Mandic in Neubauer et al.	Miocene (late Serravallian)		Serbia	A species of Pisidium.	
Planiturbo procerus	Sp. nov	Valid	Gründel, Keupp & Lang	Late Jurassic (Kimmeridgian)		Germany	A member of Vetigastropoda belonging to the family Metriomphalidae.	
Planiturbo validotuberosus	Sp. nov	Valid	Gründel, Keupp & Lang	Late Jurassic (Kimmeridgian)		Germany	A member of Vetigastropoda belonging to the family Metriomphalidae.	
Pleurotomaria? homoruspira	Sp. nov	Valid	Szabó	Early Jurassic (Sinemurian to Pliensbachian)	Hierlatz Limestone Formation	Austria	Possibly a species of Pleurotomaria.	
Pleurotomaria indistincta	Sp. nov	Valid	Szabó	Early Jurassic (Sinemurian to Pliensbachian)	Hierlatz Limestone Formation	Austria	A species of Pleurotomaria.	
Pleurotomaria? laponya	Sp. nov	Valid	Szabó	Early Jurassic (Sinemurian to Pliensbachian)	Hierlatz Limestone Formation	Austria	Possibly a species of Pleurotomaria.	
Pleurotomaria nodulocincta	Sp. nov	Valid	Szabó	Early Jurassic (Sinemurian to Pliensbachian)	Hierlatz Limestone Formation	Austria	A species of Pleurotomaria.	
Pleurotomaria nodulocostulata	Sp. nov	Valid	Szabó	Early Jurassic (Sinemurian to Pliensbachian)	Hierlatz Limestone Formation	Austria	A species of Pleurotomaria.	
Pleurotomaria nongradata	Sp. nov	Valid	Szabó	Early Jurassic (Sinemurian to Pliensbachian)	Hierlatz Limestone Formation	Austria	A species of Pleurotomaria.	
Pleurotomaria seminodosa	Sp. nov	Valid	Szabó	Early Jurassic (Sinemurian to Pliensbachian)	Hierlatz Limestone Formation	Austria	A species of Pleurotomaria.	
Pleurotomaria wiesberghausensis	Sp. nov	Valid	Szabó	Early Jurassic (Sinemurian to Pliensbachian)	Hierlatz Limestone Formation	Austria	A species of Pleurotomaria.	
Pleurotomella bezoyensis	Sp. nov	Valid	Lozouet	Oligocene (Chattian)		France	A species of Pleurotomella.	
Pleurotomella protocarinata	Sp. nov	Valid	Lozouet	Oligocene (Chattian)		France	A species of Pleurotomella.	
Pleurotomella protocostulata	Sp. nov	Valid	Lozouet	Oligocene (Chattian)		France	A species of Pleurotomella.	
Pleurotomella rappardiformis	Sp. nov	Valid	Lozouet	Oligocene (Chattian)		France	A species of Pleurotomella.	
Pleurotomoides gemmata	Sp. nov	Valid	Lozouet	Oligocene (Chattian)		France	A member of the family Clathurellidae.	
Pleurotomoides lapicidinae	Sp. nov	Valid	Lozouet	Oligocene (Chattian)		France	A member of the family Clathurellidae.	
Pleurotomoides poustagnacensis	Sp. nov	Valid	Lozouet	Oligocene (Chattian)		France	A member of the family Clathurellidae.	
Pleurotomoides rupina	Sp. nov	Valid	Lozouet	Oligocene (Chattian)		France	A member of the family Clathurellidae.	
Potadomoides armata	Sp. nov	Valid	Musalizi	Late Miocene		Uganda	A member of the family Paludomidae, a species of Potadomoides.	
Potadomoides jupakombae	Sp. nov	Valid	Musalizi	Late Miocene		Uganda	A member of the family Paludomidae, a species of Potadomoides.	
Procerithium subimbricatum	Sp. nov	Valid	Ferrari	Early Jurassic (Pliensbachian)	Neuquén Basin	Argentina	A member of the family Procerithiidae.	
Proconulus kotrus	Sp. nov	Valid	Cataldo	Early Cretaceous		Argentina	A member of Proconulidae.	
Pseudodostia constantinensis	Sp. nov	Valid	Symonds, Gain & Belliard	Eocene	Cotentin Basin	France	A member of the family Neritidae.	
Pseudolusitanops	Gen. et comb. nov	Valid	Lozouet	Oligocene (Chattian)		France	A member of the family Raphitomidae. Genus includes "Lusitanops" bulbiformis Lozouet (1999)	
Pseudomalaxis berezovskyi	Nom. nov	Valid	Pacaud	Paleocene (Danian)		Ukraine	A member of Architectonicidae.	
Pseudomalaxis varonei	Sp. nov	Valid	Pacaud	Eocene (Ypresian)		France	A member of Architectonicidae.	
Pseudorbis beugnonensis	Sp. nov	Valid	Landau, Van Dingenen & Ceulemans	Late Miocene		France	A species of Pseudorbis.	
Pseudovertagus? longbottomi	Sp. nov	Valid	Darragh	Late Eocene	Pallinup Formation	Australia	Possibly a species of Pseudovertagus.	
Pterotheca hispanica	Sp. nov	Valid	Ebbestad & Gutiérrez-Marco	Silurian (Aeronian)	Formigoso Formation	Spain	A member of Bellerophontoidea belonging to the family Carinaropsidae.	
Pupoides (Ischnopupoides) gnocco	Sp. nov	Valid	Cabrera & Martínez	Late Cretaceous	Queguay Formation	Uruguay	A species of Pupoides.	
Pyrgulopsis paleoacarinatus	Sp. nov	Valid	Czaja et al.	Late Pleistocene or early Holocene		Mexico	A species of Pyrgulopsis.	
Pyrgulopsis paleominckleyi	Sp. nov	Valid	Czaja et al.	Late Pleistocene or early Holocene		Mexico	A species of Pyrgulopsis.	
Raphitoma arenosa	Sp. nov	Valid	Lozouet	Oligocene (Chattian)		France	A species of Raphitoma.	
Raphitoma asperata	Sp. nov	Valid	Lozouet	Oligocene (Chattian)		France	A species of Raphitoma.	
Raphitoma exasperata	Sp. nov	Valid	Lozouet	Oligocene (Chattian)		France	A species of Raphitoma.	
Raphitoma lilliputiana	Sp. nov	Valid	Lozouet	Oligocene (Chattian)		France	A species of Raphitoma.	
Raphitoma mediodenticulata	Sp. nov	Valid	Lozouet	Oligocene (Chattian)		France	A species of Raphitoma.	
Raphitoma neoscapulata	Sp. nov	Valid	Lozouet	Early Miocene		France	A species of Raphitoma.	
Raphitoma pleurotomelloides	Sp. nov	Valid	Lozouet	Oligocene (Chattian)		France	A species of Raphitoma.	
Raphitoma scapulata	Sp. nov	Valid	Lozouet	Oligocene (Chattian)		France	A species of Raphitoma.	
Raphitoma suberinacea	Sp. nov	Valid	Lozouet	Oligocene (Chattian)		France	A species of Raphitoma.	
Raphitoma subfragilis	Sp. nov	Valid	Lozouet	Oligocene (Chattian)		France	A species of Raphitoma.	
Rimella pyramoides	Sp. nov	Valid	Belliard, Gain & Le Renard	Eocene		France	A species of Rimella.	
Rimulopsis broesamleni	Sp. nov	Valid	Gründel, Keupp & Lang	Late Jurassic (Kimmeridgian)		Germany	A member of the family Fissurellidae.	
Rimulopsis perforata	Sp. nov	Valid	Gründel, Keupp & Lang	Late Jurassic (Kimmeridgian)		Germany	A member of the family Fissurellidae.	
Rissoa sarae	Sp. nov	Valid	Brunetti, Cresti & Forli	Pliocene		Italy	A species of Rissoa.	
Rissoina oolitensis	Nom. nov	Valid	Faber	Middle Jurassic	Great Oolite Group	United Kingdom	A species of Rissoina; a replacement name for Rissoina cancellata Morris & Lycett (1850).	
Sassenfjordia	Gen. et sp. nov	Valid	Kaim et al.	Early Cretaceous (late Berriasian)		Norway	Possibly a member of Naticoidea. Genus includes new species S. sassenfjordensis.	
Sclarotrarda	Gen. et comb. nov	Valid	Gründel, Keupp & Lang	Late Jurassic (Kimmeridgian)		Germany	A member of Vetigastropoda belonging to the family Sclarotrardidae. The type species is "Liotia" coronilla Brösamlen (1909).	
Seila stenopyrgisca	Sp. nov	Valid	Darragh	Late Eocene	Pallinup Formation	Australia	A species of Seila.	
Semicassis szilviae	Sp. nov	Valid	Kovács & Vicián	Middle Miocene	Sámsonháza Formation	Hungary	A species of Semicassis.	
Sinezona geigeri	Sp. nov	Valid	Landau, Van Dingenen & Ceulemans	Late Miocene		France	A species of Sinezona.	
Siphonaria vulcanica	Sp. nov	Valid	Harzhauser, Landau & Breitenberger	Miocene (Langhian)	Sámsonháza Formation	Hungary	A species of Siphonaria.	
Skenea minuticostata	Sp. nov	Valid	Landau, Van Dingenen & Ceulemans	Late Miocene		France	A species of Skenea.	
Skenea wareni	Sp. nov	Valid	Landau, Van Dingenen & Ceulemans	Late Miocene		France	A species of Skenea.	
Sokella	Gen. et sp. nov	Valid	Mazaev	Middle Permian		Russia	A member of the family Phymatopleuridae. The type species is S. sokensis.	
Sphaerocypraea conternoi	Sp. nov	Valid	Checchi & Zamberlan	Eocene (Lutetian)		Italy	A member of the family Ovulidae.	
Sphaerocypraea lessinea	Sp. nov	Valid	Checchi & Zamberlan	Eocene (late Ypresian - early Lutetian)		Italy	A member of the family Ovulidae.	
Sphaerocypraea parvula	Sp. nov	Valid	Checchi & Zamberlan	Eocene (late Ypresian - early Lutetian)		Italy	A member of the family Ovulidae.	
Spiniloma? faxensis	Sp. nov	Valid	Schnetler & Milàn	Paleocene (Danian)	Faxe Formation	Denmark	A member of the family Aporrhaidae.	
Splendrillia laevissima	Sp. nov	Valid	Lozouet	Oligocene (Chattian)		France	A species of Splendrillia.	
Splendrillia marconensis	Sp. nov	Valid	Lozouet	Oligocene (Chattian)		France	A species of Splendrillia.	
Splendrillia subspinifera	Sp. nov	Valid	Lozouet	Oligocene (Chattian)		France	A species of Splendrillia.	
Stenodrillia pseudoneuvillei	Sp. nov	Valid	Lozouet	Oligocene (Chattian)		France	A species of Stenodrillia.	
Sudanistes	Gen. et comb. nov	Valid	Harzhauser & Neubauer in Harzhauser et al.	Early Paleocene to middle Eocene	Hudi Chert Formation	Algeria; Libya; Niger; Sudan	A member of Ampullariidae. The type species is "Pseudoceratodes" rex Cox (1933); genus also includes "Ceratodes" jolyi Jodot (1913), "Ceratodes" niameyensis Dollfus & Dautzenberg (1925) and "Pseudoceratodes" clariondi Jodot (1953).	
Szabotomaria	Gen. et sp. et comb. nov	Valid	Monari, Gatto & Valentini	Jurassic (Pliensbachian to Bajocian)		France; Germany; Luxembourg; United Kingdom	A member of the family Pleurotomariidae. The type species is S. ziqquratiformis; genus also includes "Pleurotomaria" subdecorata Münster in Goldfuss (1844), "Pleurotomaria" subornata Münster in Goldfuss (1844), "Pleurotomaria" subtilis Münster in Goldfuss (1844), "Pleurotomaria" depereti Riche (1904), "Pleurotomaria" araris Riche (1904) and "Pleurotomaria" vaffieri Riche (1904).	
Tasmeuthria? arenicola	Sp. nov	Valid	Darragh	Late Eocene	Pallinup Formation	Australia	A member of Buccinidae, possibly a species of Tasmeuthria.	
Tegulacanthus	Gen. et comb. nov	Valid	Gründel, Keupp & Lang	Late Jurassic (Kimmeridgian)		Germany	A member of the family Angariidae. The type species is "Turbo" tegulatus Münster in Goldfuss (1844).	
Teretia oligocaenica	Sp. nov	Valid	Lozouet	Oligocene (Chattian)		France	A species of Teretia	
Thelecythara oligocaenica	Sp. nov	Valid	Lozouet	Oligocene (Chattian)		France	A species of Thelecythara.	
Thetidos fossilis	Sp. nov	Valid	Lozouet	Oligocene (Chattian)		France	A member of the family Raphitomidae.	
Thysanodonta chauvereauensis	Sp. nov	Valid	Landau, Van Dingenen & Ceulemans	Late Miocene		France	A species of Thysanodonta.	
Timbellus capitaneus	Sp. nov	Valid	Pacaud, Goret & Ledon	Eocene (Lutetian)		France	A species of Timbellus.	
Tornatellaea densistriata	Sp. nov	Valid	Blagovetshenskiy	Early Cretaceous (Barremian)		Russia (Ulyanovsk Oblast)	A member of Acteonidae.	
Tornatellaea gracilis	Sp. nov	Valid	Blagovetshenskiy	Early Cretaceous (Barremian)		Russia (Ulyanovsk Oblast)	A member of Acteonidae.	
Tornatellaea kabanovi	Sp. nov	Valid	Blagovetshenskiy	Early Cretaceous (Hauterivian)		Russia (Ulyanovsk Oblast)	A member of Acteonidae.	
Tornatellaea neuquina	Sp. nov	Valid	Cataldo	Early Cretaceous		Argentina	A member of Acteonidae.	
Tornatellaea sinzovi	Sp. nov	Valid	Blagovetshenskiy	Early Cretaceous (Aptian)		Russia (Ulyanovsk Oblast)	A member of Acteonidae.	
Tornatellaea volgensis	Sp. nov	Valid	Blagovetshenskiy	Early Cretaceous (Barremian)		Russia (Ulyanovsk Oblast)	A member of Acteonidae.	
Tortulosa naggsi	Sp. nov	Valid	Raheem & Schneider in Raheem et al.	Miocene (Aquitanian)	Hang Mon Formation	Vietnam	A member of the family Pupinidae.	
Torusataphrus	Gen. et comb. nov	Valid	Gründel, Keupp & Lang	Late Jurassic		Germany	A member of the family Ataphridae. The type species is "Natica" inornata Quenstedt (1858).	
Trahaldia	Gen. et comb. nov	Valid	Pacaud	Eocene (Bartonian)		France	A member of the family Columbellidae; a new genus for "Purpura" ringens Deshayes (1865).	
Trituba (Granulotriforis) umboseriata	Sp. nov	Valid	Darragh	Late Eocene	Pallinup Formation	Australia	A species of Trituba.	
Trivellona makranica	Sp. nov	Valid	Harzhauser in Harzhauser et al.	Miocene (Burdigalian)	Band-e-Chaker Formation	Iran	A species of Trivellona.	
Trochaclis isabellae	Sp. nov	Valid	Tabanelli, Bongiardino & Scarponi	Pliocene		Italy	A species of Trochaclis.	
Turricula sanctistephani	Sp. nov	Valid	Lozouet	Oligocene (Chattian)		France	A species of Turricula.	
Turris semipustulosa	Sp. nov	Valid	Lozouet	Oligocene (Chattian)		France	A species of Turris.	
Undatotectus	Gen. et sp. nov	Valid	Gründel, Keupp & Lang	Late Jurassic (Kimmeridgian)		Germany	A member of Vetigastropoda belonging to the family Epulotrochidae. The type species is U. glaber.	
Vanikoropsis? leviplicata	Sp. nov	Valid	Cataldo	Early Cretaceous		Argentina	A member of Vanikoridae.	
?Vertigo vracevicensis	Sp. nov	Valid	Neubauer & Harzhauser in Neubauer et al.	Miocene (late Serravallian)		Serbia	Possibly a species of Vertigo sensu lato.	
Wernerocutus	Gen. et comb. nov	Valid	Gründel, Keupp & Lang	Late Jurassic (Kimmeridgian)		Germany	A member of Vetigastropoda, possibly belonging to the family Epulotrochidae. The type species is "Trochus" angulatoplicatus Münster in Goldfuss (1844).	
Yuopisthonema	Nom. nov	Valid	Nützel in Bouchet et al.	Ordovician		China	A gastropod of uncertain phylogenetic placement; a replacement name for Opisthonema Yu (1974).	

== Other molluscs ==
=== Research ===
- A study on the shell microstructure of the specimens of the Cambrian micromollusk species Pelagiella madianensis recovered from the Xinji Formation (China) is published by Li et al. (2017).
- Mass accumulations of large bivalves are reported at the oldest-known, Silurian methane seep near El Borj (Morocco) by Jakubowicz, Hryniewicz & Bełka (2017).
- Foam oysters belonging to the genus Liostrea, found attached to the ammonoid shells, are described from the Early Triassic of Greenland, India and Pakistan by Hautmann, Ware & Bucher (2017).

=== New taxa ===
Name	Novelty	Status	Authors	Age	Unit	Location	Notes	Images
Annulipulsellum (Annulipulsellum) ambiguum	Sp. nov	Valid	Guzhov	Jurassic		Russia	A tusk shell belonging to the family Pulsellidae.	
Annulipulsellum (Annulipulsellum) rugosum	Sp. nov	Valid	Guzhov	Jurassic		Russia	A tusk shell belonging to the family Pulsellidae.	
Annulipulsellum (Mesopulsellum)	Subgen. et 4 sp. nov	Valid	Guzhov	Jurassic		Russia	A tusk shell belonging to the family Pulsellidae. The subgenus includes A. alternoides, A. calloviense, A. hirtistriatum and A. medium.	
Archivesica aharoni	Sp. nov	Valid	Kiel & Taviani	Miocene		Italy	A bivalve belonging to the family Vesicomyidae.	
Archivesica apenninica	Sp. nov	Valid	Kiel & Taviani	Miocene		Italy	A bivalve belonging to the family Vesicomyidae.	
Archivesica arctica	Sp. nov	Valid	Hansen et al.	Late Pleistocene		Eastern Fram Strait	A bivalve belonging to the family Vesicomyidae.	
Archivesica strigarum	Sp. nov	Valid	Kiel & Taviani	Miocene		Italy	A bivalve belonging to the family Vesicomyidae.	
Bathymodiolus (s.l.) miomediterraneus	Sp. nov	Valid	Kiel & Taviani	Miocene		Italy	A bivalve belonging to the subfamily Bathymodiolinae.	
Bathymodiolus (s.l.) moroniae	Sp. nov	Valid	Kiel & Taviani	Miocene		Italy	A bivalve belonging to the subfamily Bathymodiolinae.	
Beukeria	Gen. et sp. nov	Valid	Ebbestad, Rhebergen & Gubanov	Late Ordovician		Germany; Netherlands	A rostroconch belonging to the group Ribeirioida and the family Ischyriniidae. The type species is B. plicata.	
Caestocorbula gigantica	Sp. nov	Valid	Roy & Mukherjee	Paleogene	Mangrol Lignite Mine	India		
Calvapilosa	Gen. et sp. nov	Valid	Vinther et al.	Early Ordovician		Morocco	A stem-aculiferan. The type species is C. kroegeri.	
Coelatura gommeryi	Sp. nov	Valid	Musalizi	Late Miocene		Uganda	A bivalve belonging to the family Unionidae, a species of Coelatura.	
Conchocele kiritachiensis	Sp. nov	Valid	Hryniewicz et al.	Late Eocene	Sakasagawa Formation	Japan	A bivalve belonging to the family Thyasiridae.	
Costagyra garza	Sp. nov	Valid	Squires	Late Cretaceous (Maastrichtian)	Moreno Formation	United States (California)	An oyster belonging to the family Gryphaeidae.	
Costinuculana	Gen. et sp. nov	Valid	Ayoub-Hannaa, Abdelhady & Fürsich	Middle Jurassic (Bathonian)	Kehailia Subformation	Egypt	A bivalve belonging to the family Nuculanidae. Genus includes new species C. magharensis.	
Crassatella imitatoris	Sp. nov	Valid	Berezovsky	Late Eocene		Ukraine	A bivalve belonging to the family Crassatellidae.	
Crassatella pseudolamellosa	Sp. nov	Valid	Berezovsky	Late Eocene		Ukraine	A bivalve belonging to the family Crassatellidae.	
Curvostrea baia	Sp. nov	Valid	Squires	Late Cretaceous (Maastrichtian)	Moreno Formation	United States (California)	An oyster belonging to the family Flemingostreidae.	
Cyclocardia dalek	Sp. nov	Valid	Pérez & del Río	Cenozoic	Monte León Formation; San Julián Formation	Argentina	A bivalve belonging to the family Carditidae. Originally described as a species of Cyclocardia; Pérez & Giachetti (2020) transferred it to the genus Oesterheldia.	
Darwinicardia	Gen. et comb. nov	Valid	Pérez & del Río	Eocene to Miocene	Barranca Final Formation; Carmen Silva Formation; Monte León Formation; San Julián Formation	Argentina; France	A bivalve belonging to the family Carditidae. A new genus for "Cardita" patagonica Sowerby (1846); genus also includes "Venericardia" angusticostata Deshayes (1825).	
Davidonia	Nom. nov	Valid	Parkhaev	Cambrian		Australia	A replacement name for Mackinnonia Runnegar in Bengtson et al. (1990).	
Deltoideum (Boreiodeltoideum) borealis	Sp. nov	Valid	Kosenko	Late Jurassic (Kimmeridgian)	Sigovskaya Formation	Russia	A bivalve belonging to the family Gryphaeidae.	
Entolium alaskanum	Sp. nov	Valid	McRoberts	Late Triassic (Norian)		United States (Alaska)	A bivalve.	
Erugonia boydi	Sp. nov	Valid	McRoberts	Late Triassic (Norian)		United States (Alaska)	A bivalve.	
Filamussium walleri	Sp. nov	Valid	McRoberts	Late Triassic (Norian)		United States (Alaska)	A bivalve.	
Garatella	Gen. et comb. nov	Valid	Cooper & Leanza	Early Cretaceous		Argentina; Peru	A bivalve belonging to the group Myophorelloidea and the family Steinmanellidae. A new genus for "Trigonia" quintucoensis Weaver (1931); genus also includes "Trigonia" neuquensis Burckhardt (1903), Garatella raimondii (Lisson, 1930) and "Steinmanella" subquadrata Luci & Lazo (2012).	
Gardneridentalium	Gen. et 2 sp. nov	Valid	Guzhov	Jurassic		Russia	A tusk shell belonging to the family Pulsellidae. Genus includes new species G. primitivum and G. reticulatum.	
Gracilipulsellum	Gen. et sp. nov	Valid	Guzhov	Jurassic		Russia	A tusk shell belonging to the family Pulsellidae. Genus includes new species G. iodaense.	
Harpax articulatum	Sp. nov	Valid	McRoberts	Late Triassic (Norian)		United States (Alaska)	A bivalve.	
Horiopleura brevis	Sp. nov	Valid	Masse & Fenerci-Masse	Early Cretaceous (Aptian)		Egypt; France; Oman; Romania; Serbia; Spain; Turkey	A rudist bivalve belonging to the family Polyconitidae.	
Hypoanthraconaia	Gen. et sp. nov	Valid	Silantiev & Urazaeva	Early Permian	Pospelovka Subformation	Russia (Primorsky Krai)	A bivalve belonging to the family Naiaditidae. The type species is H. russkiensis.	
Iotrigonia elekansuensis	Sp. nov	Valid	Yanin & Bogdanova	Early Cretaceous (Hauterivian–Barremian)		Russia	A bivalve belonging to the family Trigoniidae.	
Ischyrinia viator	Sp. nov	Valid	Ebbestad, Rhebergen & Gubanov	Late Ordovician		Germany; Netherlands	A rostroconch belonging to the group Ribeirioida and the family Ischyriniidae.	
Kalelia	Gen. et comb. nov	Valid	Pérez & del Río	Paleocene	Roca Formation; Salamanca Formation	Argentina; France	A bivalve belonging to the family Carditidae. Genus includes K. burmeisteri (Böhm, 1903), K. multicostata (Lamarck, 1806) and K. pectuncularis (Lamarck, 1806).	
Kolmeris	Gen. et comb. nov	Valid	Pérez & del Río	Pliocene to recent		Argentina; New Zealand	A bivalve belonging to the family Carditidae. A new genus for "Venericardia" tehuelchana Ihering (1907); genus also includes fossil species "Pleuromeris" murdochi Powell (1938), as well as extant species Pleuromeris marshalli and Pleuromeris paucicostata.	
Louella	Gen. et comb. nov	Valid	Cooper & Leanza	Late Cretaceous		United States (California; Oregon); Japan?	A bivalve belonging to the group Myophorelloidea and the family Steinmanellidae. The type species is "Trigonia" fitchi Packard (1921); genus might also include L? jimboi Kobayashi & Amano (1955).	
Maorithyas humptulipsensis	Sp. nov	Valid	Hryniewicz et al.	Middle Eocene	Humptulips Formation	United States (Washington)	A bivalve belonging to the family Thyasiridae.	
Megacardita hoernesi	Sp. nov	Valid	La Perna, Mandic & Harzhauser	Miocene (Langhian)		Austria; Bosnia and Herzegovina Croatia; Czech Republic; Hungary; Romania; Slovakia	A bivalve belonging to the family Carditidae and the subfamily Venericardiinae.	
Megacardita? redoniana	Nom. nov	Valid	La Perna, Mandic & Harzhauser	Miocene (Messinian)–early Pliocene		France; Portugal	A bivalve belonging to the family Carditidae and the subfamily Venericardiinae; a replacement name for Cardita striatissima var. abbreviata Dollfus & Cotter (1909) (raised to the rank of a separate species, a junior homonym of Cardita abbreviata Conrad, 1841).	
Meganuculana	Gen. et sp. nov	Valid	Amano & Jenkins	Paleocene	Katsuhira Formation	Japan	A bivalve belonging to the family Nuculanidae. The type species is N. alleni.	
Mesoantalis	Gen. et 3 sp. nov	Valid	Guzhov	Jurassic		Russia	A tusk shell belonging to the family Gadilidae. Genus includes new species M. clava, M. expolitum and M. volgense.	
Mesoentalina	Gen. et sp. nov	Valid	Guzhov	Jurassic		Russia	A tusk shell belonging to the family Pulsellidae. Genus includes new species M. fabulosa.	
Microlimus	Gen. et sp. nov	Valid	Berezovsky	Late Eocene		Ukraine	A bivalve belonging to the family Limidae. The type species is M. primus.	
Minetrigonia newtonae	Sp. nov	Valid	McRoberts	Late Triassic (Norian)		United States (Alaska)	A bivalve.	
Myophorella ardonensis	Sp. nov	Valid	Yanin & Bogdanova	Early Cretaceous (Berriasian–Valanginian)		Russia	A bivalve belonging to the family Trigoniidae.	
Myophorigonia parva	Sp. nov	Valid	McRoberts	Late Triassic (Norian)		United States (Alaska)	A bivalve.	
Neilonella alleni	Sp. nov	Valid	Amano & Jenkins	Paleocene	Katsuhira Formation	Japan	A bivalve belonging to the family Neilonellidae.	
Nemocardium jovei	Sp. nov	Valid	Calzada	Cretaceous		Spain	A cockle.	
Neuquenella	Gen. et comb. nov	Valid	Cooper & Leanza	Early Cretaceous		Argentina; South Africa	A bivalve belonging to the group Myophorelloidea and the family Steinmanellidae. The type species is "Steinmanella (Macrotrigonia)" pehuenmapuensis Leanza (1998); genus also includes "Steinmanella" kensleyi Cooper (1979)	
Oscillopha popenoei	Sp. nov	Valid	Squires	Late Cretaceous (late Santonian)	Redding Formation	United States (California)	An oyster belonging to the family Arctostreidae.	
Palaeonucula muffleri	Sp. nov	Valid	McRoberts	Late Triassic (Norian)		United States (Alaska)	A bivalve.	
Palaeopharus orchardi	Sp. nov	Valid	McRoberts	Late Triassic (Norian)		United States (Alaska)	A bivalve.	
Pernostrea mesezhnikovi	Sp. nov	Valid	Kosenko	Late Jurassic		Russia	A bivalve belonging to the family Gryphaeidae.	
Pernostrea? robusta	Sp. nov	Valid	Kosenko	Late Jurassic		Russia	A bivalve belonging to the family Gryphaeidae.	
Philippiella	Gen. et comb. nov	Junior homonym	Cooper & Leanza	Late Jurassic		Argentina; Chile	A bivalve belonging to the group Myophorelloidea and the family Steinmanellidae. The type species is "Trigonia" erycina Philippi (1899); genus also includes "Trigonia" haupti Lambert (1944). The generic name is preoccupied by Philippiella Pfeffer (1886), Philippiella Waagen (1907), and Philippiella Poulsen (1965).	
Phygraea arida	Sp. nov	Valid	Squires	Late Cretaceous (Campanian and Maastrichtian)	Cedar District Formation; Moreno Formation	Canada (British Columbia); United States (California)	An oyster belonging to the family Gryphaeidae.	
Pinna keexkwaanensis	Sp. nov	Valid	McRoberts	Late Triassic (Norian)		United States (Alaska)	A bivalve, a species of Pinna.	
Plagiostoma scallanae	Sp. nov	Valid	McRoberts	Late Triassic (Norian)		United States (Alaska)	A bivalve, a species of Plagiostoma.	
Pleiodon nambiae	Sp. nov	Valid	Musalizi	Late Miocene		Uganda	A bivalve belonging to the family Iridinidae.	
'Pliocardia' italica	Sp. nov	Valid	Kiel & Taviani	Miocene		Italy	A bivalve belonging to the family Vesicomyidae.	
Pojetaconcha costulata	Sp. nov	Valid	Ebbestad, Rhebergen & Gubanov	Late Ordovician		Germany	A rostroconch belonging to the group Conocardiida and the family Bransoniidae.	
Popenoella	Gen. et comb. nov	Valid	Cooper & Leanza	Late Cretaceous		Canada (British Columbia); United States (California; Oregon)	A bivalve belonging to the group Myophorelloidea and the family Steinmanellidae. The type species is "Trigonia" hemphilli Anderson (1958); genus also includes P. branti (Saul, 1978), P. californiana (Packard, 1921), P. pinea (Saul, 1978), P. robusta (Saul, 1978) and P. tryoniana (Gabb, 1864).	
Procardia? tanakai	Sp. nov	Valid	Miyajima, Nobuhara & Koike	Middle Miocene	Bessho Formation	Japan	A bivalve belonging to the family Vesicomyidae.	
Procardium jansseni	Sp. nov	Valid	Poorten & La Perna	Miocene (late Burdigalian to Langhian)	Breda Formation	Germany; Netherlands	A cockle.	
Procardium magnei	Sp. nov	Valid	Poorten & La Perna	Miocene (Burdigalian)		France	A cockle.	
Pseudoyaadia	Gen. et comb. nov	Valid	Cooper & Leanza	Early Cretaceous		South Africa; Tanzania	A bivalve belonging to the group Myophorelloidea and the family Steinmanellidae. The type species is "Trigonia" hennigi Lange (1914).	
Ptychomya esbelta	Sp. nov	Valid	Milla Carmona, Lazo & Soto	Early Cretaceous	Agrio Formation	Argentina	A bivalve.	
Quadratotrigonia baksanensis	Sp. nov	Valid	Mordvilko in Yanin & Bogdanova	Early Cretaceous (Hauterivian)		Russia	A bivalve belonging to the family Trigoniidae.	
Rotundicardia mariobrosorum	Sp. nov	Valid	Pérez & del Río	Paleocene (Danian)	Roca Formation	Argentina	A bivalve belonging to the family Carditidae.	
Samiolus	Gen. et sp. nov	Valid	Kiel & Taviani	Miocene		Italy	A bivalve belonging to the family Mytilidae. Genus includes new species S. iohannesbaptistae.	
Septifer (Septifer) manipurensis	Sp. nov	Valid	Singh, Sijagurumayum & Singh	Eocene	Upper Disang Formation	India	A bivalve belonging to the family Mytilidae.	
Shikamaia ozakii	Sp. nov	Valid	Asato & Kase in Asato et al.	Permian		Japan	A bivalve belonging to the family Alatoconchidae.	
Simbosia	Gen. et 2 sp. nov	Valid	Berezovsky	Late Eocene		Ukraine	A bivalve belonging to the family Limidae. Genus includes new species S. alatа and S. oblongа.	
Stoyanowella	Gen. et comb. nov	Valid	Cooper & Leanza	Late Jurassic		United States (Texas)	A bivalve belonging to the group Myophorelloidea and the family Steinmanellidae. A new genus for "Trigonia" vyschetzkii Cragin (1893); genus also includes "Trigonia" maloneana Stoyanow (1949).	
Swiftopecten djoserus	Sp. nov	Valid	Yoshimura	Pliocene	Zukawa Formation	Japan	A scallop.	
Tancredia norica	Sp. nov	Valid	McRoberts	Late Triassic (Norian)		United States (Alaska)	A bivalve.	
Tashiroella	Gen. et comb. nov	Valid	Cooper & Leanza	Late Cretaceous		Japan	A bivalve belonging to the group Myophorelloidea and the family Steinmanellidae. The type species is "Yaadia" tanii Tashiro & Morozumi (1982); genus also includes T. koshikiana (Tashiro & Kano, 1989).	
Tindaria paleocenica	Sp. nov	Valid	Amano & Jenkins	Paleocene	Katsuhira Formation	Japan	A bivalve belonging to the family Tindariidae.	
Tolmachovia sublirata	Sp. nov	Valid	Ebbestad, Rhebergen & Gubanov	Late Ordovician		Netherlands	A rostroconch belonging to the group Ribeirioida and the family Ischyriniidae.	
Trigonia oblonga	Sp. nov	Valid	Yanin & Bogdanova	Early Cretaceous (Aptian)		Russia	A bivalve belonging to the family Trigoniidae.	
Volviceramus cardinalensis	Sp. nov	Valid	Walaszczyk, Plint & Landman	Late Cretaceous (Coniacian)		Canada (Alberta)	A bivalve belonging to the family Inoceramidae.	
Volviceramus stotti	Sp. nov	Valid	Walaszczyk, Plint & Landman	Late Cretaceous (Coniacian)		Canada (Alberta)	A bivalve belonging to the family Inoceramidae.	
Weaverella	Gen. et comb. nov	Valid	Cooper & Leanza	Early Cretaceous		Argentina; Chile	A bivalve belonging to the group Myophorelloidea and the family Steinmanellidae. The type species is "Trigonia" transitoria var. curacoensis Weaver (1931), raised to the rank of a separate species W. curacoensis; genus also includes W. lepida (Philippi, 1899) and W. steinmanni (Philippi, 1899).	
