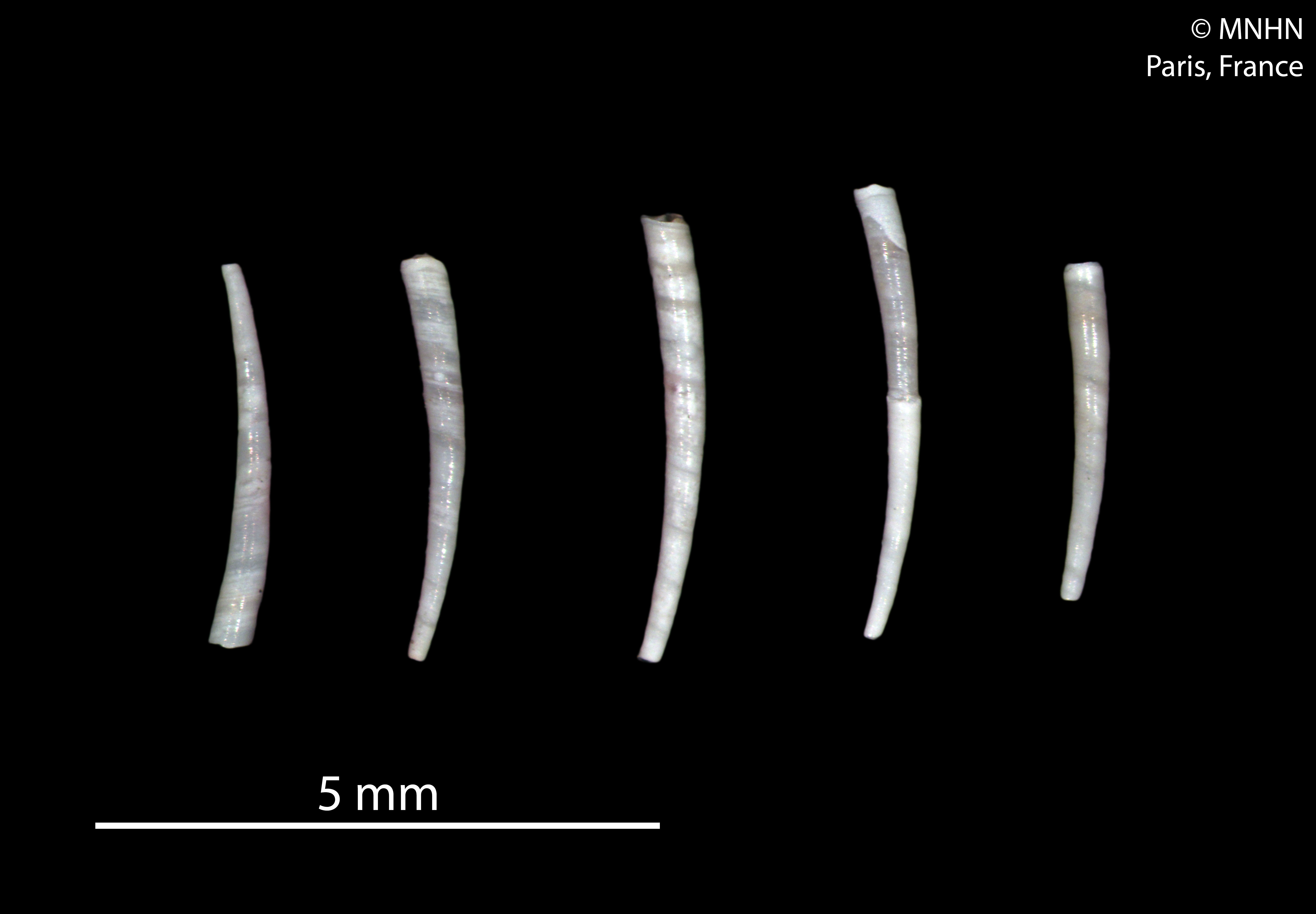
- Shell of Pulsellum filiforme (paratype at MNHN, Paris)

Scientific classification
- Kingdom: Animalia
- Phylum: Mollusca
- Subphylum: Conchifera
- Class: Scaphopoda
- Order: Gadilida
- Family: Pulsellidae; Boss, 1982

= Pulsellidae =

Family of molluscs

Pulsellidae is a family of molluscs belonging to the suborder Gadilimorpha in the order Gadilida.

Genera:

- Annulipulsellum Scarabino, 1986
- Pulsellum Stoliczka, 1868
- Striopulsellum Scarabino, 1995
