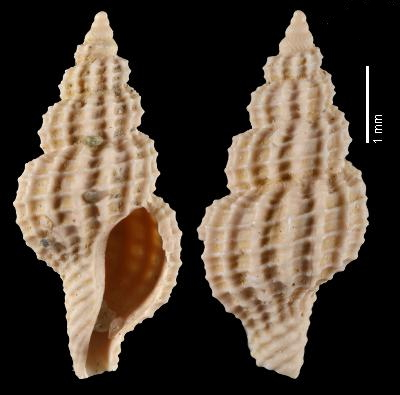
- Shell and protoconch of Raphitoma exasperata (holotype at MNHN, Paris)

Scientific classification
- Kingdom: Animalia
- Phylum: Mollusca
- Class: Gastropoda
- Subclass: Caenogastropoda
- Order: Neogastropoda
- Superfamily: Conoidea
- Family: Raphitomidae
- Genus: Raphitoma
- Species: †R. exasperata

Binomial name
- †Raphitoma exasperata Lozouet, 2017

= Raphitoma exasperata =

Extinct species of gastropod

Raphitoma exasperata is an extinct species of sea snail, a marine gastropod mollusc in the family Raphitomidae.

== Distribution ==
Fossils of this extinct marine species were found in Oligocene strata in Southwest France.
