= Papilliconus =

Scientific classification
- Kingdom: Animalia
- Phylum: Mollusca
- Class: Gastropoda
- Subclass: Caenogastropoda
- Order: Neogastropoda
- Superfamily: Conoidea
- Family: Conidae
- Genus: Papilliconus; Tracey & Craig, 2017

Type species
- † Papilliconus papillatus Tracey & Craig, 2017

Extinct genus of gastropods

Papilliconus is an extinct genus of sea snails, marine gastropod mollusks in the family Conidae.

== Species ==
Species within the genus Papilliconus include:

- † Papilliconus papillatus Tracey & Craig, 2017
- † Papilliconus radulfivillensis Tracey & Craig, 2017
