= Hierlatz Limestone =

Geologic formation in Austria

- Stratigraphic range: Jurassic
- Type: Formation

Lithology
- Primary: Limestone

Location
- Country: Austria

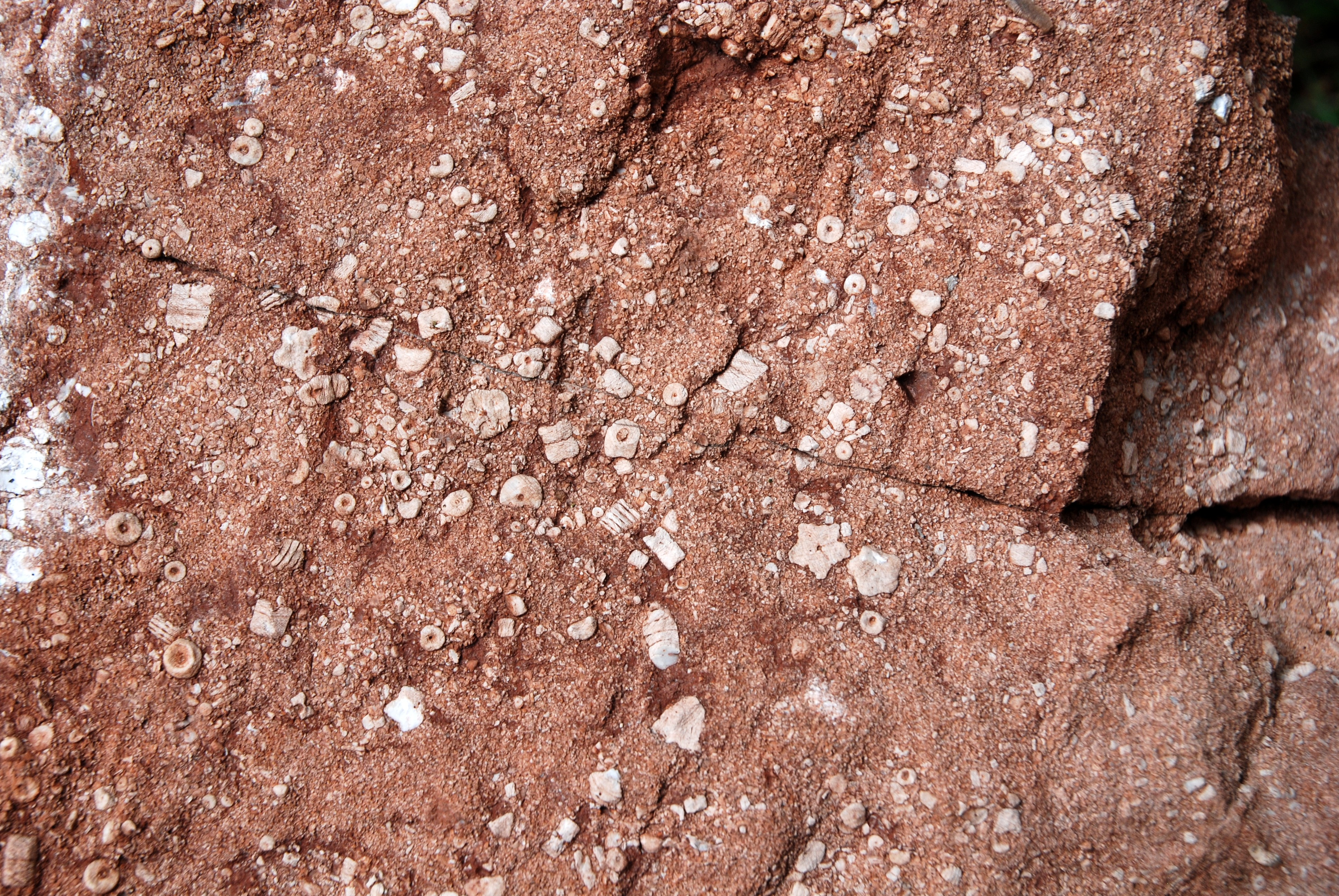
Hirlatz-limestone from late Trias/Early Jura

The Hierlatz Limestone is a geologic formation in Austria. It preserves fossils dated to the Jurassic period.

== See also ==
- List of fossiliferous stratigraphic units in Austria
