= Thysanodonta chauvereauensis =

Scientific classification
- Kingdom: Animalia
- Phylum: Mollusca
- Class: Gastropoda
- Subclass: Vetigastropoda
- Order: Trochida
- Superfamily: Trochoidea
- Family: Calliostomatidae
- Genus: Thysanodonta
- Species: †T. chauvereauensis

Binomial name
- †Thysanodonta chauvereauensis Landau, Van Dingenen & Ceulemans, 2017

Extinct species of gastropod

Thysanodonta chauvereauensis is an extinct species of sea snail, a marine gastropod mollusk, in the family Calliostomatidae within the superfamily Trochoidea, the top snails, turban snails and their allies.

== Distribution ==
This species occurs in France.
