= Boreomica =

Scientific classification
- Domain: Eukaryota
- Kingdom: Animalia
- Phylum: Mollusca
- Class: Gastropoda
- Subclass: Caenogastropoda
- Order: Littorinimorpha
- Family: Rissoidae
- Genus: †Boreomica; Guzhov, 2017

Type species
- Boreomica gerasimovi Faber & Egorov, 2015

Extinct genus of mollusks

Boreomica is an extinct genus of sea snails in the family Rissoidae that lived during the Jurassic and Cretaceous periods. This genus contains two species B. costaspiralis and B. gerasimovi, both of which are small in size.

== Species ==
This genus contains two scientifically accepted species:

- Boreomica costaspiralis Gründel, Keupp, & F. Lang, 2019
- Boreomica gerasimovi Faber & Egorov, 2015

It also contains the species Boreomica exigua (Gerasimov, 1992), which was renamed to Boreomica gerasimovi and then scientifically accepted.
