= Forbesiceras =

Forbesiceras Temporal range: U Cretaceous (Cenomanian)

Scientific classification
- Kingdom: Animalia
- Phylum: Mollusca
- Class: Cephalopoda
- Subclass: †Ammonoidea
- Order: †Ammonitida
- Family: †Forbesiceratidae
- Genus: †Forbesiceras; Kossmat, 1897

Genus of molluscs (fossil)

Forbesiceras is an ammonite that lived during the Cenomanian stage of the Late Cretaceous. Shells are moderately large, reaching diameters of 33 cm (13 in)or so, forming smooth, involute oxycones with narrow or sharp rims and closed umbilici.
