= Gonioclymenia =

Scientific classification
- Missing taxonomy template (fix): Gonioclymenia

Genus of molluscs (fossil)

Gonioclymenia is a genus of Devonian ammonites. The genus is of particular note due to their relatively large size for Palaeozoic ammonoids and often being found in large groupings. The genus is also known for its aesthetic value, which has led to it being highly exploited in the Famennian limestone of the Anti-Atlas Mountains in Morocco.
