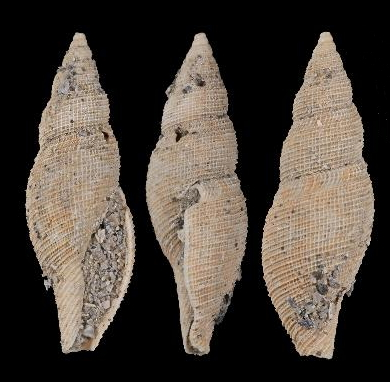
- Shell of † Daphnella gascognensis (holotype in MNHN, Paris)

Scientific classification
- Kingdom: Animalia
- Phylum: Mollusca
- Class: Gastropoda
- Subclass: Caenogastropoda
- Order: Neogastropoda
- Superfamily: Conoidea
- Family: Raphitomidae
- Genus: Daphnella
- Species: D. gascognensis

Binomial name
- Daphnella gascognensis Lozouet, 2017

= Daphnella gascognensis =

Extinct species of gastropod

Daphnella gascognensis is an extinct species of sea snail, a marine gastropod mollusc in the family Raphitomidae.

== Distribution ==
Fossils of this marine species were found in Oligocene strata in Southwest France.
