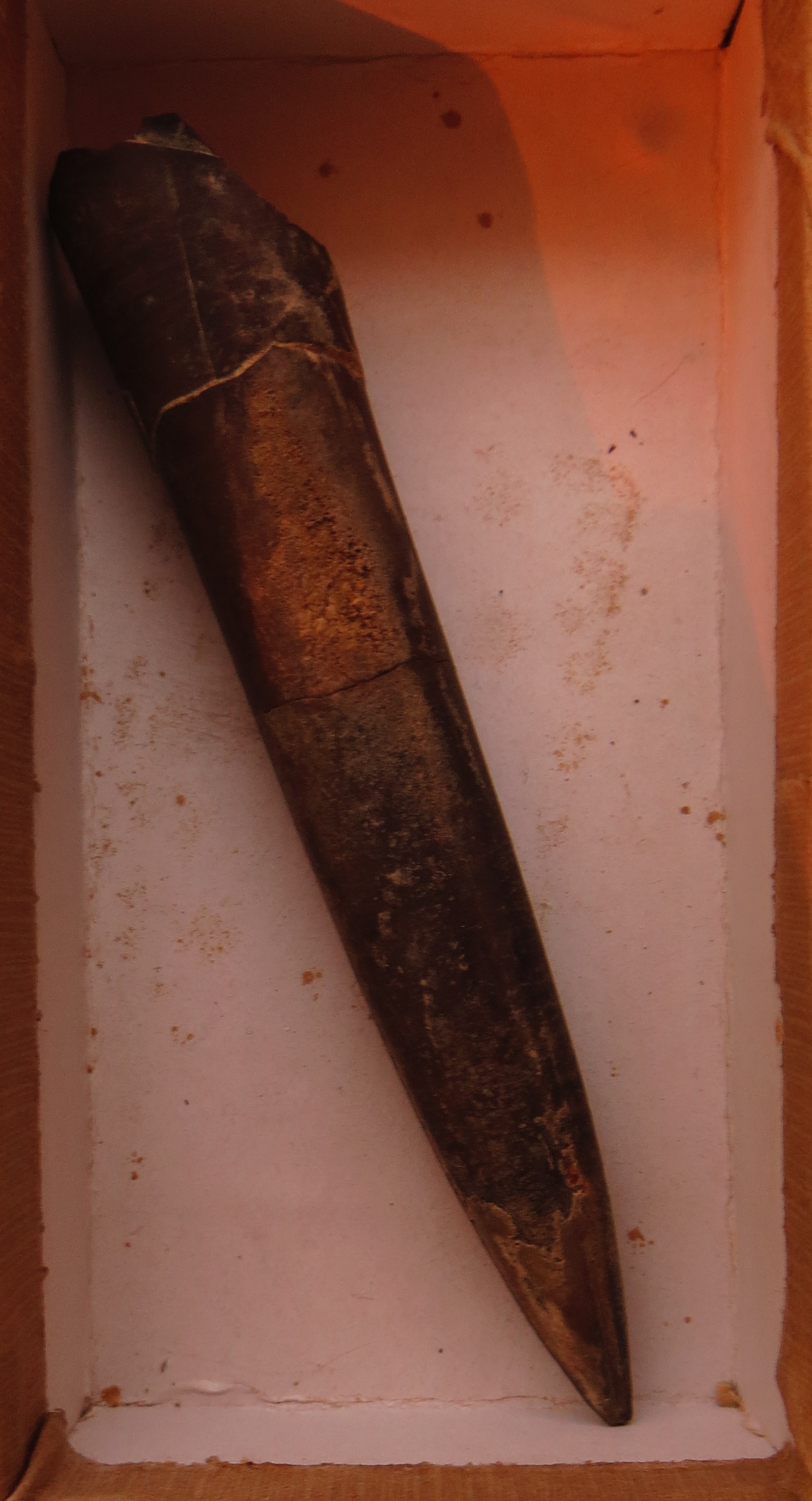

Scientific classification
- Domain: Eukaryota
- Kingdom: Animalia
- Phylum: Mollusca
- Class: Cephalopoda
- Superorder: †Belemnoidea
- Genus: †Belemnopsis

= Belemnopsis =

Extinct genus of molluscs

Series of cross section of a Belemnopsis guard from Tendaguru, obtained non-invasively via magnetic resonance microscopy.

Belemnopsis is a genus of belemnite, an extinct group of cephalopods.

== See also ==
- Belemnite
- List of belemnites
