= Balticeras =

Balticeras Temporal range: Oxfordian

Scientific classification
- Kingdom: Animalia
- Phylum: Mollusca
- Class: Cephalopoda
- Subclass: †Ammonoidea
- Order: †Ammonitida
- Family: †Perisphinctidae
- Genus: †Balticeras; Dohm, 1925

Species
- None cataloged

Genus of molluscs (fossil)

Balticeras is an involute, discoidal Upper Jurassic (Oxfordian) ammonite (order Ammonitida) found in England, Germany, and Switzerland, belonging to the Perisphinctidae. The shell is strongly embracing, tending to be oxyconic (sharp rimmed). Sides are gently curved, converging on a narrow to sharp ventral rim.

Balticeras is considered by some to be a subgenus of Ringsteadia which in contrast is more evolute, with ribbed inner whorls. Both are included in the Pictoniinae, a subfamily established by Spath, 1924, for large ammonites within the Perisphinctidae, tending to develop smooth middle and outer whorls.
