= Orthogarantiana =

Orthogarantiana Temporal range: Bajocian

Scientific classification
- Kingdom: Animalia
- Phylum: Mollusca
- Class: Cephalopoda
- Subclass: †Ammonoidea
- Genus: †Orthogarantiana

Extinct genus of molluscs

Orthogarantiana is an extinct genus from a well-known class of fossil cephalopods, the ammonites. It lived during the Middle Jurassic.

== Distribution ==
It is found only at Ile Crémieu, Oyster facies, France
