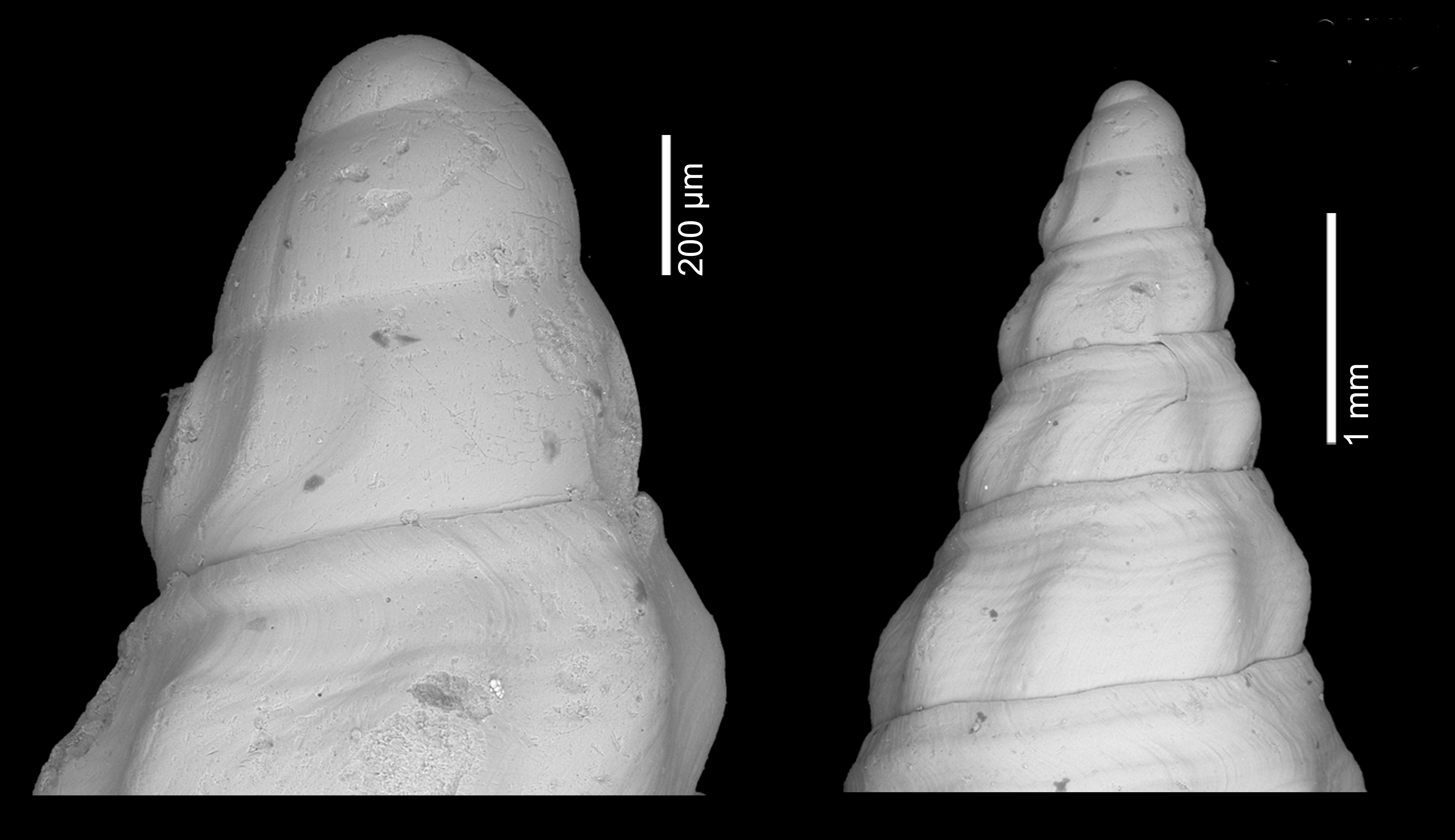
- Shell of † Crassispira virodunensis (holotype in MNHN, Paris)

Scientific classification
- Kingdom: Animalia
- Phylum: Mollusca
- Class: Gastropoda
- Subclass: Caenogastropoda
- Order: Neogastropoda
- Superfamily: Conoidea
- Family: Pseudomelatomidae
- Genus: Crassispira
- Species: C. virodunensis

Binomial name
- Crassispira virodunensis Lozouet, 2017

= Crassispira virodunensis =

Extinct species of gastropod

Crassispira virodunensis is an extinct species of sea snail, a marine gastropod mollusk in the family Pseudomelatomidae, the turrids and allies.

== Distribution ==
Fossils have been found in Oligocene strata in Aquitaine, France
