= Calliostoma presselierense =

Scientific classification
- Kingdom: Animalia
- Phylum: Mollusca
- Class: Gastropoda
- Subclass: Vetigastropoda
- Order: Trochida
- Superfamily: Trochoidea
- Family: Calliostomatidae
- Subfamily: Calliostomatinae
- Genus: Calliostoma
- Species: †C. presselierense

Binomial name
- †Calliostoma presselierense Landau, Van Dingenen & Ceulemans, 2017

Extinct species of sea snail

Calliostoma presselierense is an extinct species of sea snail, a marine gastropod mollusk, in the family Calliostomatidae within the superfamily Trochoidea, the top snails, turban snails and their allies.

== Distribution ==
This species occurs in France.
