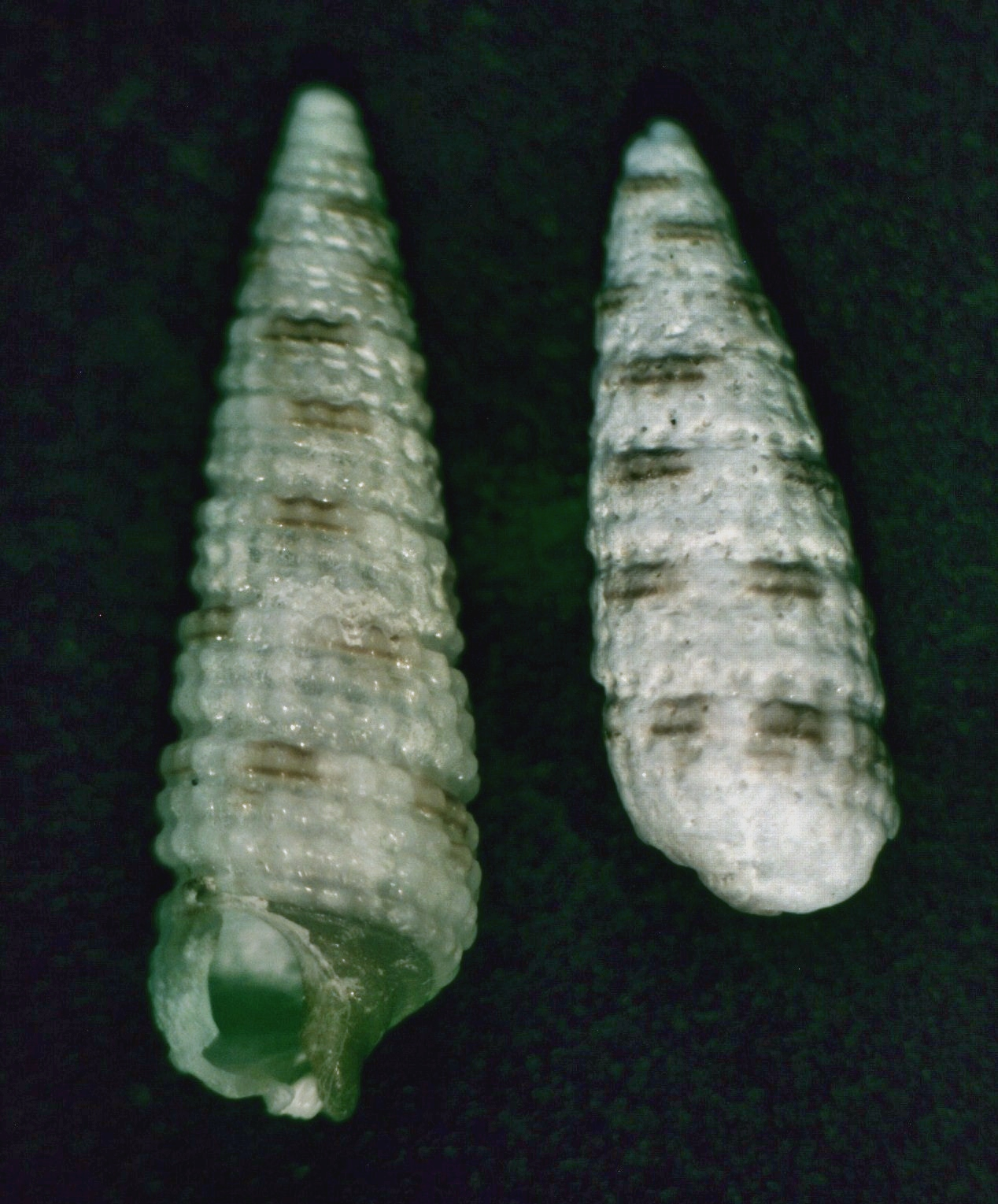
- Two shells of Aclophoropsis festiva

Scientific classification
- Kingdom: Animalia
- Phylum: Mollusca
- Class: Gastropoda
- Subclass: Caenogastropoda
- Order: incertae sedis
- Superfamily: Triphoroidea
- Family: Triphoridae
- Genus: Aclophoropsis; Marshall, 1983

Type species
- Triphoris festivus A. Adams, 1854

= Aclophoropsis =

Genus of gastropods

Aclophoropsis is a genus of minute sea snails with left-handed shell-coiling, marine gastropod mollusks or micromollusks in the family Triphoridae.

== Description ==
These small snails have left-handed shells (adult size from 6 – 12 mm) with very high spires.

== Distribution ==
These small sea snails are found in Australia (Victoria, New South Wales), Tasmania, and French Polynesia

== Species ==
Species within the genus Aclphoropsis are as follows:

- Aclophoropsis festiva (A. Adams, 1851)
- Aclophoropsis maculosa (Hedley, 1903)
- Aclophoropsis mcmichaeli (Kosuge, 1962)
- Aclophoropsis univitta (Laseron, 1954)
