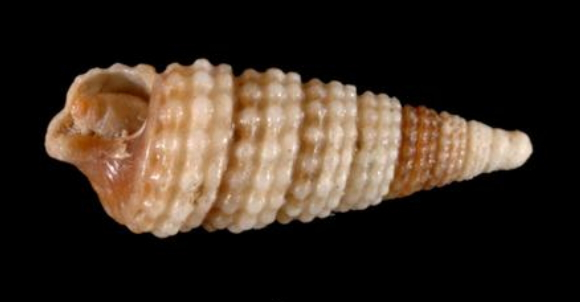
- Shell of Aclophoropsis univitta (lectotype at the Australian Museum)

Scientific classification
- Kingdom: Animalia
- Phylum: Mollusca
- Class: Gastropoda
- Subclass: Caenogastropoda
- Order: incertae sedis
- Superfamily: Triphoroidea
- Family: Triphoridae
- Genus: Aclophoropsis
- Species: A. univitta

Binomial name
- Aclophoropsis univitta (Laseron, 1954)

Synonyms
- Notosinister univitta Laseron, 1954 (original combination)

= Aclophoropsis univitta =

Species of gastropod

Aclophoropsis univitta, common name the splashed sinistral creeper, is a species of minute sea snails in the family Triphoridae.

== Description ==
The length of the shell attains 6 mm.

== Distribution ==
This species occurs off Australia (New South Wales).
