= Inella =

Inella can refer to:

- Inella (gastropod), a genus of gastropod molluscs in the family Triphoridae
- Inella (trilobite), a genus of trilobites
