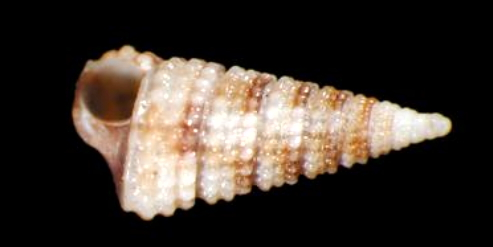
- Shell of Aclophoropsis maculosa (lectotype at the Australian Museum)

Scientific classification
- Kingdom: Animalia
- Phylum: Mollusca
- Class: Gastropoda
- Subclass: Caenogastropoda
- Order: incertae sedis
- Superfamily: Triphoroidea
- Family: Triphoridae
- Genus: Aclophoropsis
- Species: A. maculosa

Binomial name
- Aclophoropsis maculosa (Hedley, 1903)

Synonyms
- Cautor maculosus (Hedley, 1903); Notosinister maculosa (Hedley, 1903) (incorrect gender ending); Notosinister robusta Laseron, 1954 ·; Triphora maculosa Hedley, 1903 (original combination)

= Aclophoropsis maculosa =

Species of gastropod

Aclophoropsis maculosa, common name the splashed sinistral creeper, is a species of small sea snails in the family Triphoridae.

== Description ==
The length of the shell attains 6.7 mm, its diameter 2.14 mm.

(Original description) The conical shell is rather broad and solid. It contains ten whorls, parted by distinct and deep sutures.

Colour: irregularly variegated with opaque white, buff and chocolate, usually articulated with chocolate and white beneath the sutures, base chocolate and apex white.

Sculpture: the base has two plain spiral keels, above which are four rows of gemmules, the penultimate whorl and those immediately above have each three rows of gemmules. On the seventh the median row diminishes and on the whorls above gradually disappears, leaving two rows only on the upper whorls. The gemmules are round hemispherical bosses, set their own diameter apart, about 25 to a whorl, linked by a string to their fellows in the same and their neighbours in the next row. The apex is rather styliform, the second whorl has one keel, the third two, after which the keels develop gemmules and assume the adult sculpture. The aperture is perpendicular and subquadrate. The anal notch is produced on the right into a spur which crosses the columella. The anal notch is simple, shallow. The siphonal canal is short and straight.

== Distribution ==
This species occurs off Australia (New South Wales) and off the Philippines.
