= C. lutea =

C. lutea may refer to:

- Caesalpinia lutea, a plant with zygomorphic flowers
- Calathea lutea, a prayer plant
- Calea lutea, a New World plant
- Callechelys lutea, a worm eel
- Calligenia lutea, an Asian moth
- Calocera lutea, a jelly fungus
- Calostemma lutea, a perennial plant
- Canna lutea, a garden plant
- Caradrina lutea, a Eurasian moth
- Carex lutea, a sedge endemic to North Carolina
- Cariblatta lutea, a small cockroach
- Castnia lutea, a castniid moth
- Catananche lutea, a plant native to the Mediterranean
- Cautleya lutea, a perennial plant
- Cautor lutea, a sea snail
- Ceresa lutea, a buffalo treehopper
- Ceromya lutea, a tachinid fly
- Chionaspis lutea, a scale insect
- Chrysolina lutea, a leaf beetle
- Ciniflella lutea, a three-clawed spider
- Cladrastis lutea, a deciduous tree
- Cleome lutea, an annual wildflower
- Conaliamorpha lutea, a tumbling flower beetle
- Cordia lutea, a flowering plant
- Corticarina lutea, a minute brown scavenger beetle
- Corydalis lutea, a perennial plant
- Cotyledon lutea, a succulent plant
- Crimora lutea, a sea slug
- Cryptocoryne lutea, a plant endemic to Sri Lanka
- Cudonia lutea, a sac fungus
- Cuphea lutea, a plant native to the Americas
- Cyathocline lutea, a flowering plant
- Cymbiola lutea, a sea snail
- Cyrestis lutea, an Indonesian butterfly
