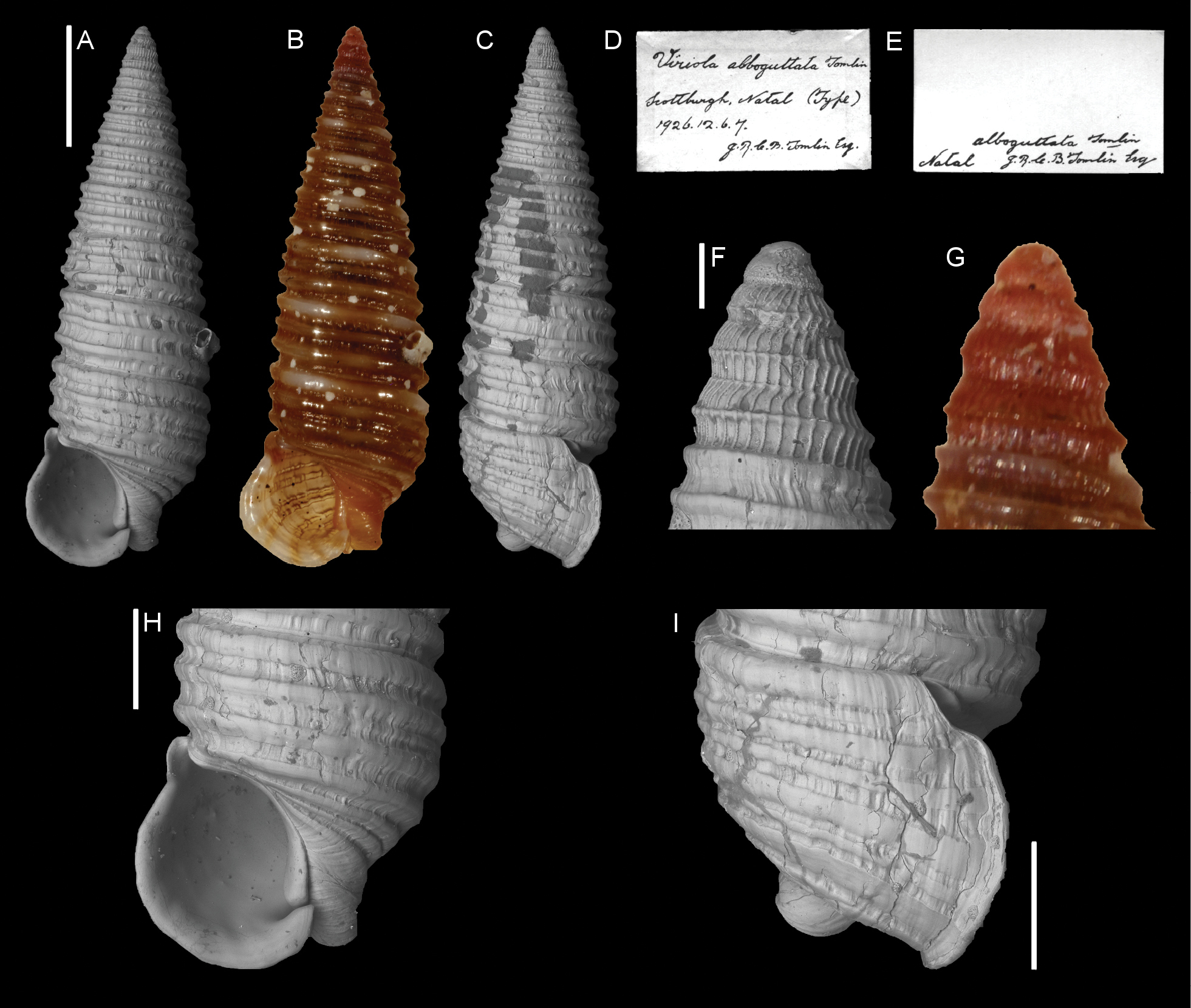
- Shells of Viriolopsis alboguttata

Scientific classification
- Kingdom: Animalia
- Phylum: Mollusca
- Class: Gastropoda
- Subclass: Caenogastropoda
- Order: incertae sedis
- Superfamily: Triphoroidea
- Family: Triphoridae
- Genus: Viriolopsis; B. A. Marshall, 1983

Type species
- Viriolopsis occidua B. A. Marshall, 1983

= Viriolopsis =

Genus of gastropods

Viriolopsis is a genus of very small sea snails, marine gastropod molluscs in the subfamily Triphorinae of the family Triphoridae.

== Species ==
- Viriolopsis alboguttata (Tomlin, 1926)
- Viriolopsis fallax (Kay, 1979)
- Viriolopsis occidua B. A. Marshall, 1983
