= Aclophoropsis mcmichaeli =

Scientific classification
- Kingdom: Animalia
- Phylum: Mollusca
- Class: Gastropoda
- Subclass: Caenogastropoda
- Order: incertae sedis
- Superfamily: Triphoroidea
- Family: Triphoridae
- Genus: Aclophoropsis
- Species: A. mcmichaeli

Binomial name
- Aclophoropsis mcmichaeli (Kosuge, 1962)

Synonyms
- Cautor maculosus mcmichaeli Kosuge, 1962; Cautor mcmichaeli Kosuge, 1962 ·

Species of gastropod

Aclophoropsis mcmichaeli, common name the splashed sinistral creeper, is a species of minute sea snails in the family Triphoridae.

== Description ==
The length of the shell varies between 3 mm and 5 mm.

== Distribution ==
This marine species occurs off the Ryukyu Islands and the Philippines.
