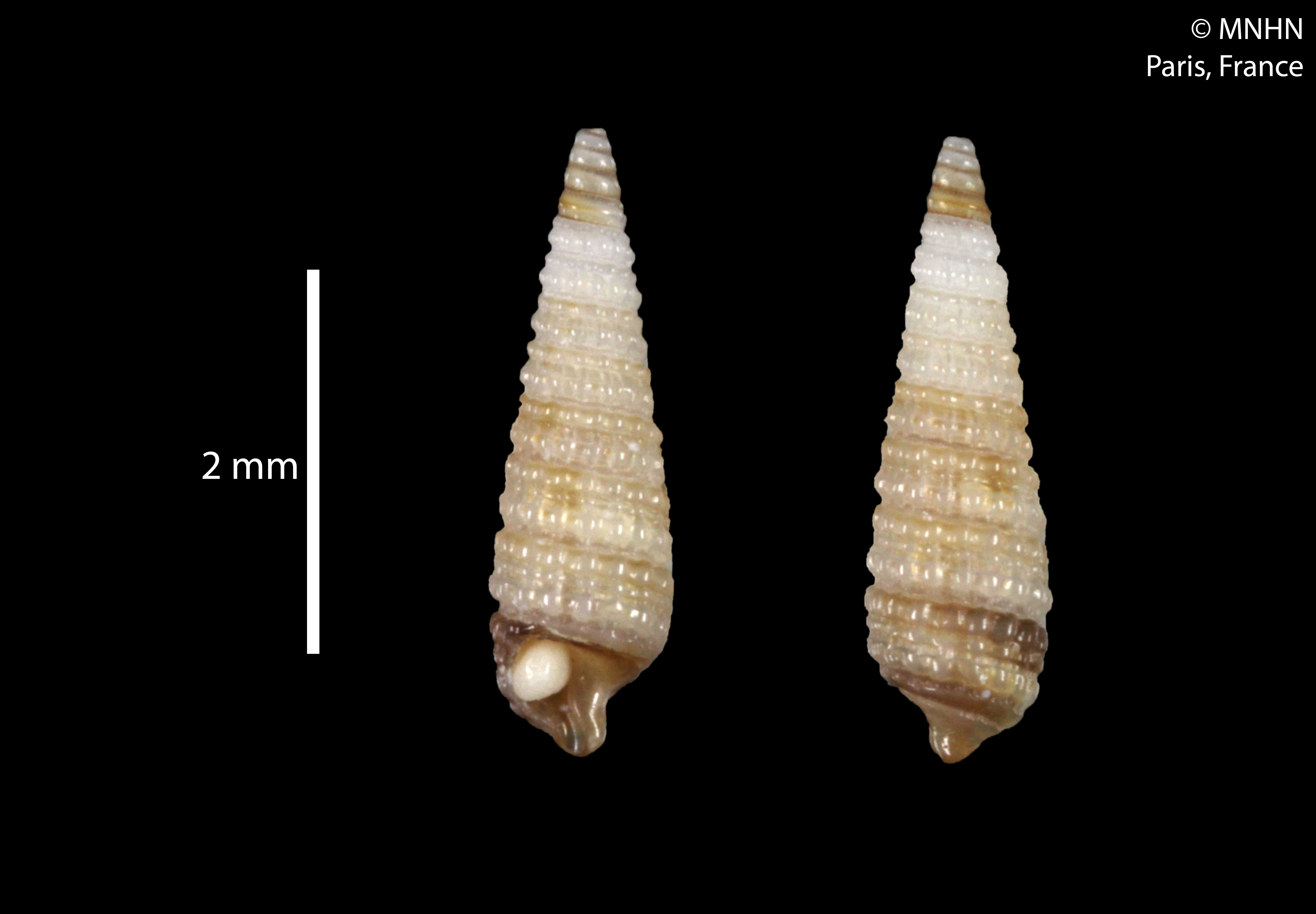
- Shell of Hedleytriphora basimacula (paratype at MNHN, Paris)

Scientific classification
- Kingdom: Animalia
- Phylum: Mollusca
- Class: Gastropoda
- Subclass: Caenogastropoda
- Order: incertae sedis
- Superfamily: Triphoroidea
- Family: Triphoridae
- Genus: Hedleytriphora; B. A. Marshall, 1983

Type species
- Triphoris fasciata Tenison Woods, 1879

= Hedleytriphora =

Genus of gastropods

Hedleytriphora is a genus of minute sea snails, marine gastropod mollusks or micromollusks in the family Triphoridae.

== Species ==
Species within the genus Hedleytriphora are as follows:

- Hedleytriphora basimacula B. A. Marshall, 1983
- Hedleytriphora elata (Thiele, 1930)
- Hedleytriphora fasciata (Tenison Woods, 1879)
- Hedleytriphora innotabilis (Hedley, 1903)
- Hedleytriphora scitula (A. Adams, 1854)
