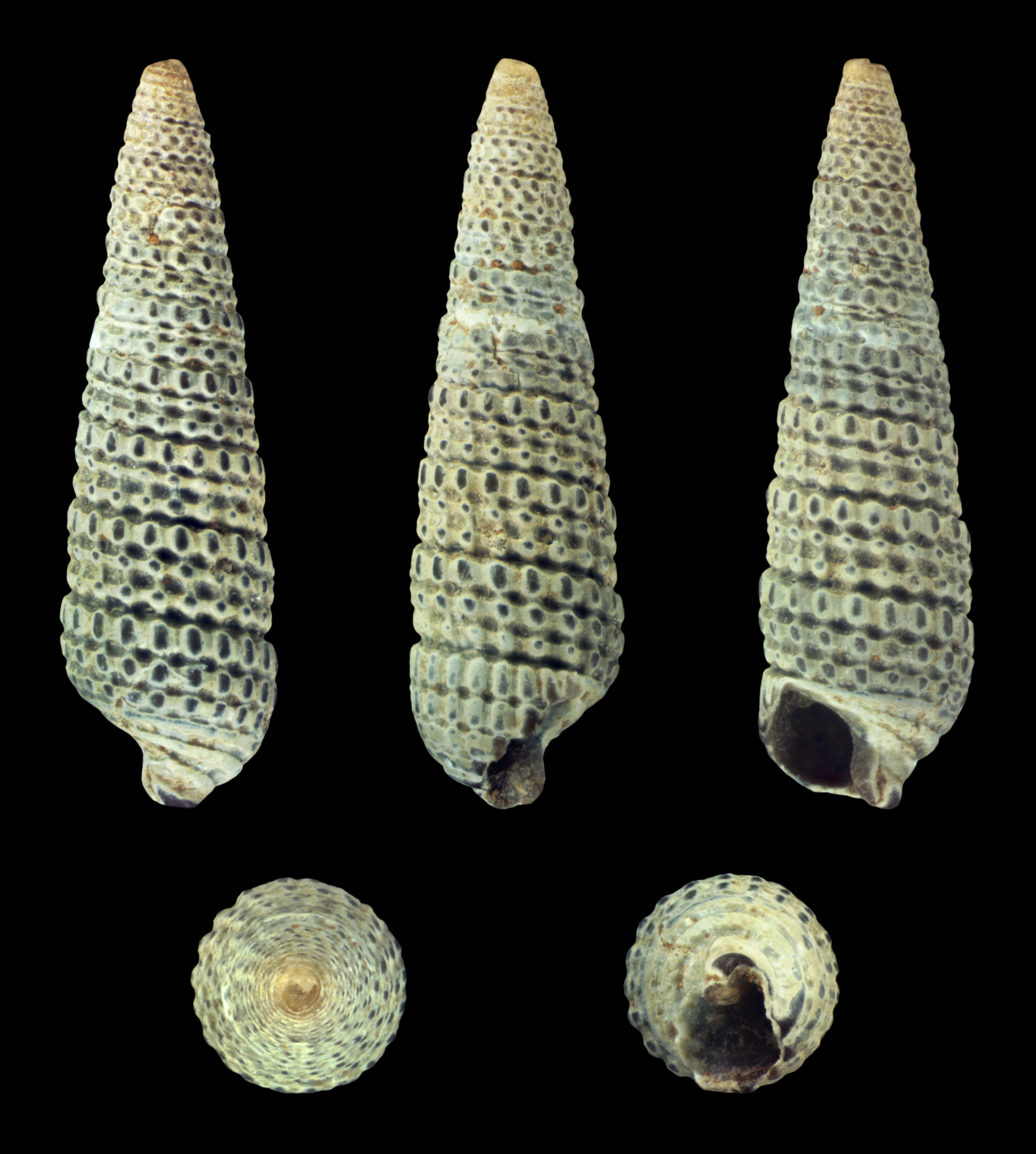
- Cheirodonta pallescens

Scientific classification
- Kingdom: Animalia
- Phylum: Mollusca
- Class: Gastropoda
- Subclass: Caenogastropoda
- Order: incertae sedis
- Family: Triphoridae
- Genus: Cheirodonta; Marshall, 1983

= Cheirodonta =

Genus of sea snails

Cheirodonta is a genus of gastropods belonging to the family Triphoridae.

The genus has almost cosmopolitan distribution.

Species:

- Cheirodonta dupliniana (Olsson, 1916)
- Cheirodonta labiata (Adams, 1854)
- Cheirodonta pallescens (Jeffreys, 1867)
