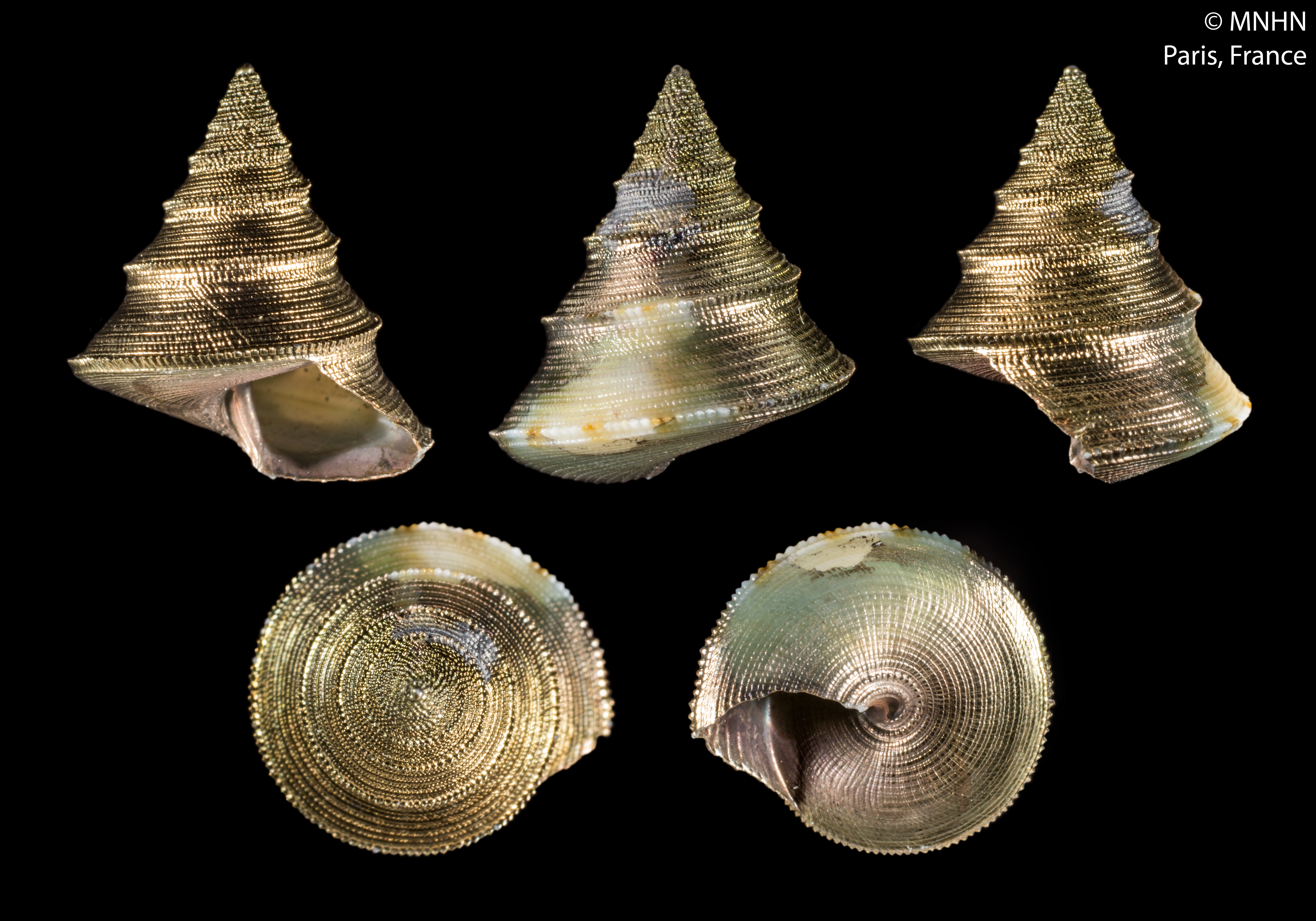
- Shell of Calliostoma heros (holotype at MNHN, Paris)

Scientific classification
- Kingdom: Animalia
- Phylum: Mollusca
- Class: Gastropoda
- Subclass: Vetigastropoda
- Order: Trochida
- Family: Calliostomatidae
- Genus: Calliostoma
- Species: C. heros

Binomial name
- Calliostoma heros Marshall, 1995

Synonyms
- Calliostoma (Ampullotrochus) heros Marshall, 1995

= Calliostoma heros =

Species of gastropod

Calliostoma heros is a species of sea snail, a marine gastropod mollusk in the family Calliostomatidae.

Some authors place this taxon in the subgenus Calliostoma (Ampullotrochus)

== Distribution ==
This marine species occurs off New Caledonia.
