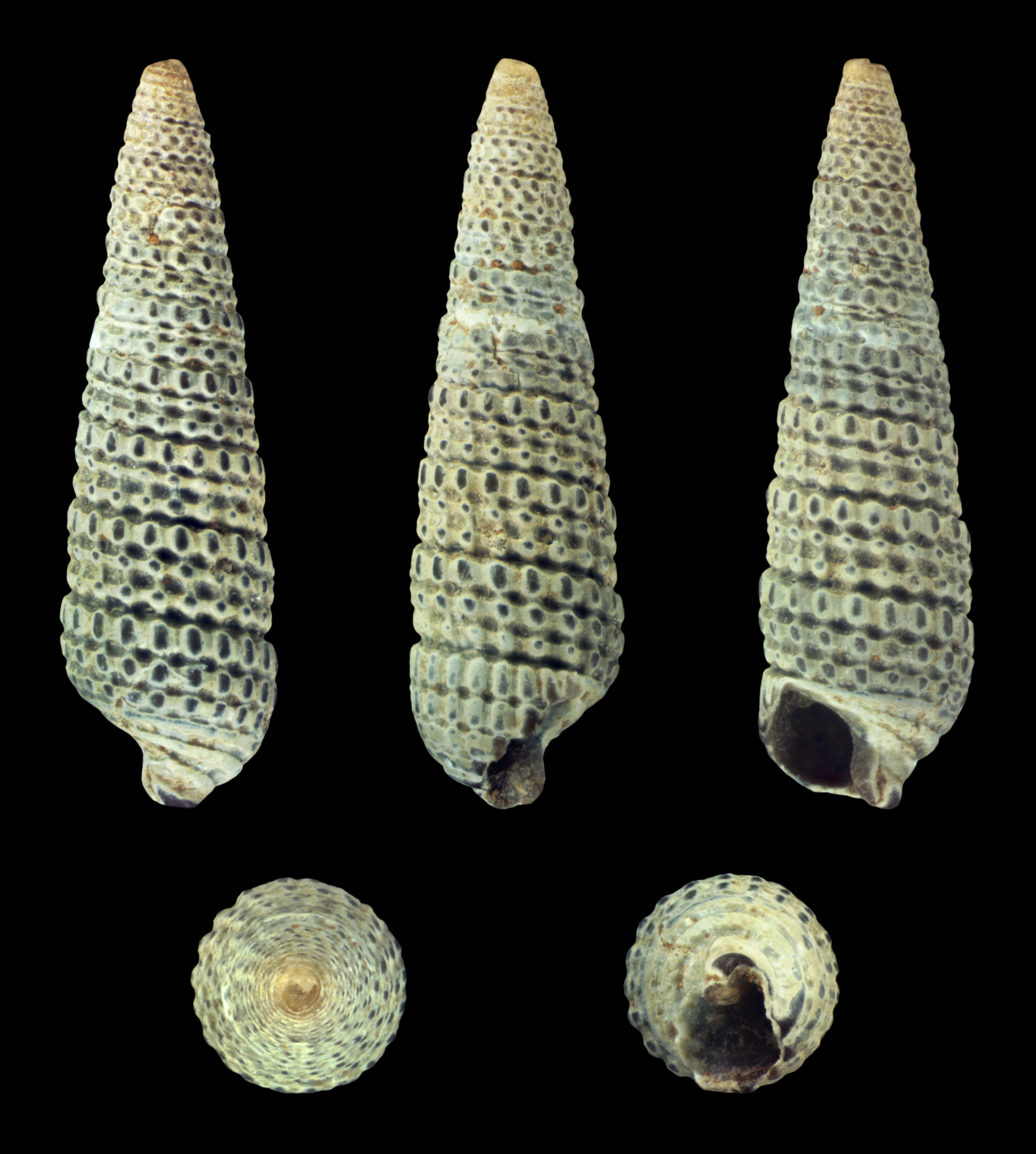

Scientific classification
- Kingdom: Animalia
- Phylum: Mollusca
- Class: Gastropoda
- Subclass: Caenogastropoda
- Order: incertae sedis
- Family: Triphoridae
- Genus: Cheirodonta
- Species: C. pallescens

Binomial name
- Cheirodonta pallescens (Jeffreys, 1867)

= Cheirodonta pallescens =

Species of gastropod

Cheirodonta pallescens is a species of gastropods belonging to the family Triphoridae.

The species is found in Southern Europe.
