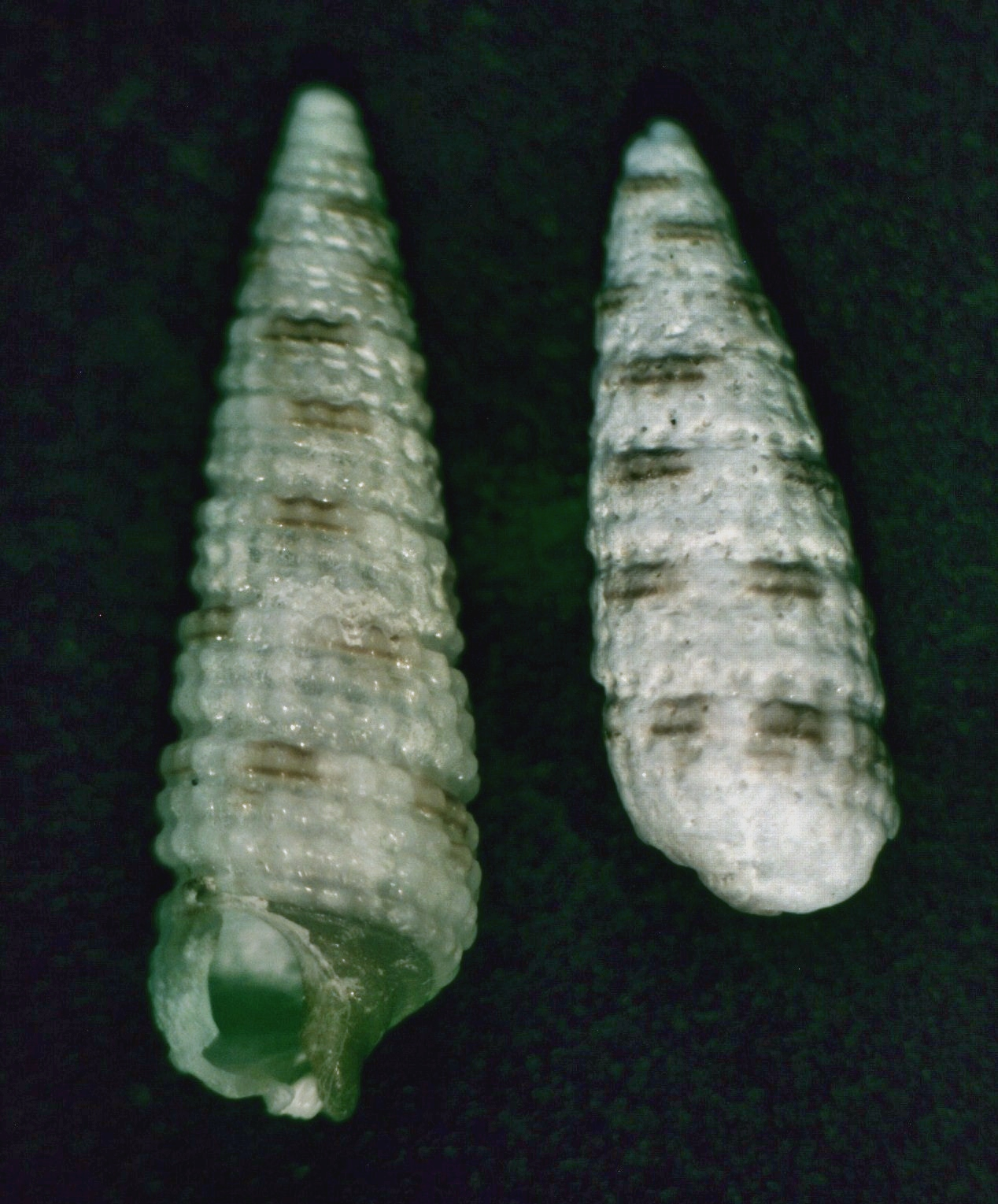

Scientific classification
- Kingdom: Animalia
- Phylum: Mollusca
- Class: Gastropoda
- Subclass: Caenogastropoda
- Order: incertae sedis
- Family: Triphoridae
- Genus: Aclophoropsis
- Species: A. festiva

Binomial name
- Aclophoropsis festiva (A. Adams, 1851)

Synonyms
- Cautor maculosa Cotton & Godfrey, 1931 (not Hedley, 1903).; Notosinister festiva Cotton & Godfrey, 1931; Triphora festiva A. Adams, 1854; Triphoris festivus A. Adams, 1854

= Aclophoropsis festiva =

Species of gastropod

Aclophoropsis festiva is a species of small sea snails in the family Triphoridae.

== Description ==
This a small prettily marked species with two rows of granules on each whorl and with the interstices deeply punctured.

They have left-handed shell-coiling, (adult size from 6 – 12 mm) with very high spires.

== Distribution ==
This species is endemic to Australia and occurs off South Australia, Tasmania, Victoria and Western Australia.
