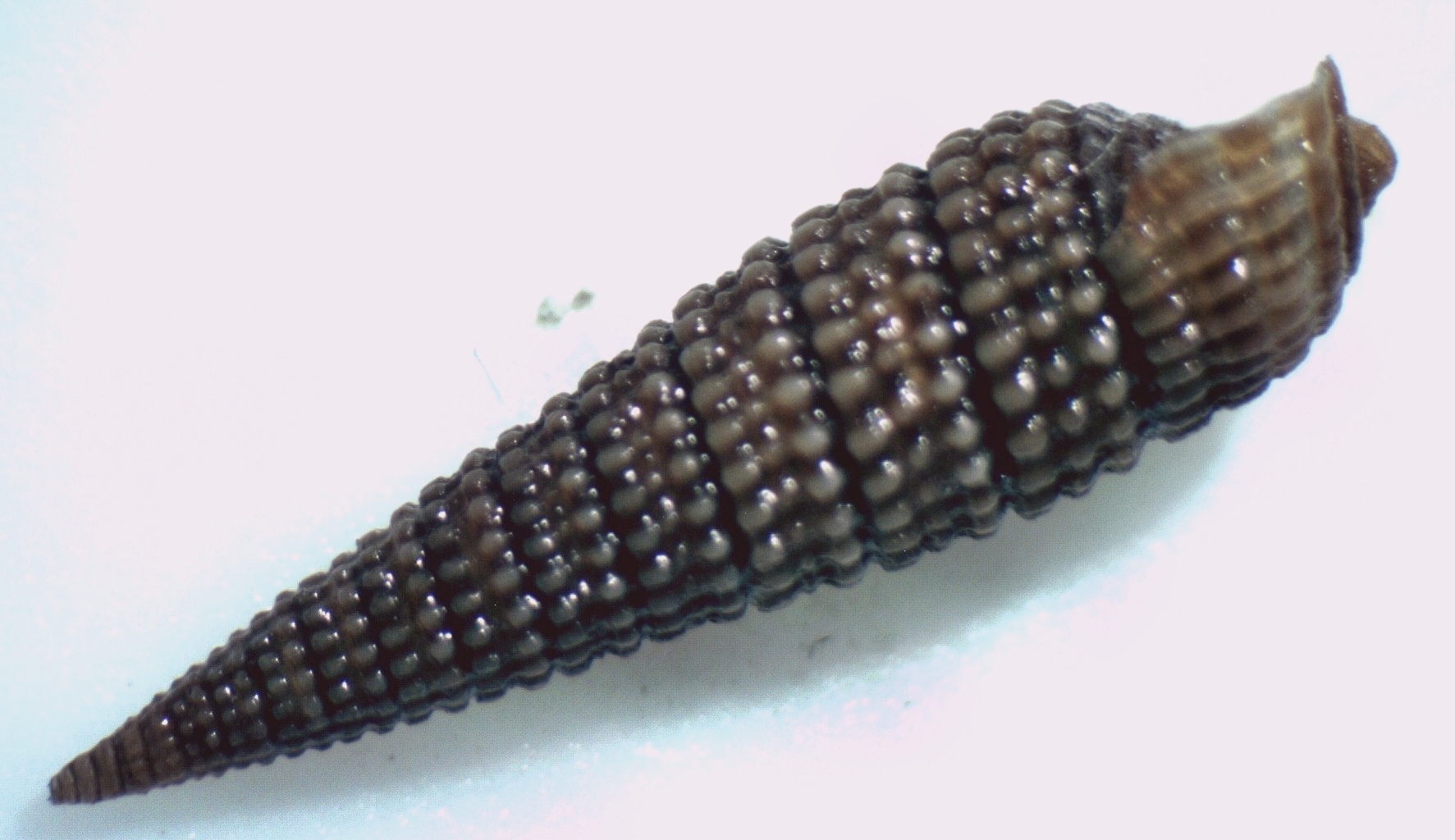
- Dorsal view of a shell of Monophorus perversus

Scientific classification
- Kingdom: Animalia
- Phylum: Mollusca
- Class: Gastropoda
- Subclass: Caenogastropoda
- Order: incertae sedis
- Superfamily: Triphoroidea
- Family: Triphoridae
- Genus: Monophorus; Grillo, 1877

Type species
- Monophorus perversus (Linnaeus, C., 1758)

Synonyms
- Biforina Bucquoy, Dautzenberg & Dollfus, 1884; Notosinister Finlay, 1926

= Monophorus =

Genus of gastropods

Monophorus is a genus of minute sea snails with left-handed shell-coiling, marine gastropod mollusks or micromollusks in the family Triphoridae.

== Species ==
Species within the genus Monophorus are as follows:

- Monophorus alboranensis Rolán & Peñas, 2001
- Monophorus amicitiae Romani, 2015
- Monophorus angasi (Crosse & P. Fischer, 1865)
- Monophorus ateralbus Rolán & Fernández-Garcés, 1994
- Monophorus atratus (Kosuge, 1962)
- Monophorus australicus B. A. Marshall, 1983
- Monophorus caracca (Dall, 1927)
- Monophorus cinereus (Hedley, 1902)
- Monophorus constrictus (Laseron, 1958)
- † Monophorus cristulatus Sacco, 1895
- Monophorus diminutus (Laseron, 1958)
- Monophorus episcopalis (Hervier, 1898)
- Monophorus erythrosoma (Bouchet & Guillemot, 1978)
- Monophorus fascelinus (Suter, 1908)
- Monophorus graphius (Kosuge, 1963)
- Monophorus hopensis (Laseron, 1958)
- † Monophorus insertus (Marwick, 1928)
- † Monophorus invectus Harzhauser, 2014
- Monophorus iwaotakii (Kosuge, 1963)
- Monophorus lucidulus (Hervier, 1898)
- Monophorus micans (Laseron, 1958)
- Monophorus monachus (Hervier, 1898)
- Monophorus monocelha M. Fernandes & Araya, 2019
- Monophorus nigrofuscus (A. Adams, 1854)
- Monophorus nitidus (Kosuge, 1963)
- Monophorus olivaceus (Dall, 1889)
- Monophorus pantherinus Rolán & Peñas, 2001
- Monophorus perversus (Linnaeus, 1758)
- Monophorus puniceus (Kosuge, 1963)
- Monophorus quadrimaculatus (Hervier, 1898)
- † Monophorus renauleauensis Landau, Ceulemans & Van Dingenen, 2018
- Monophorus rufulus (R. B. Watson, 1886)
- Monophorus stiparus (Laseron, 1958)
- Monophorus strictus (Laseron, 1958)
- Monophorus subaurus (Laseron, 1958)
- Monophorus tessellatus (Kosuge, 1963)
- Monophorus testaceus (Kosuge, 1963)
- Monophorus thiriotae Bouchet, 1985
- Monophorus tubularis (Laseron, 1958)
- Monophorus verdensis Fernandes & Rolán, 1988
- Monophorus verecundus M. Fernandes & Pimenta, 2020

Synonyms

- Monophorus fascelina (Suter, 1908): synonym of Monophorus fascelinus (Suter, 1908) (incorrect gender)

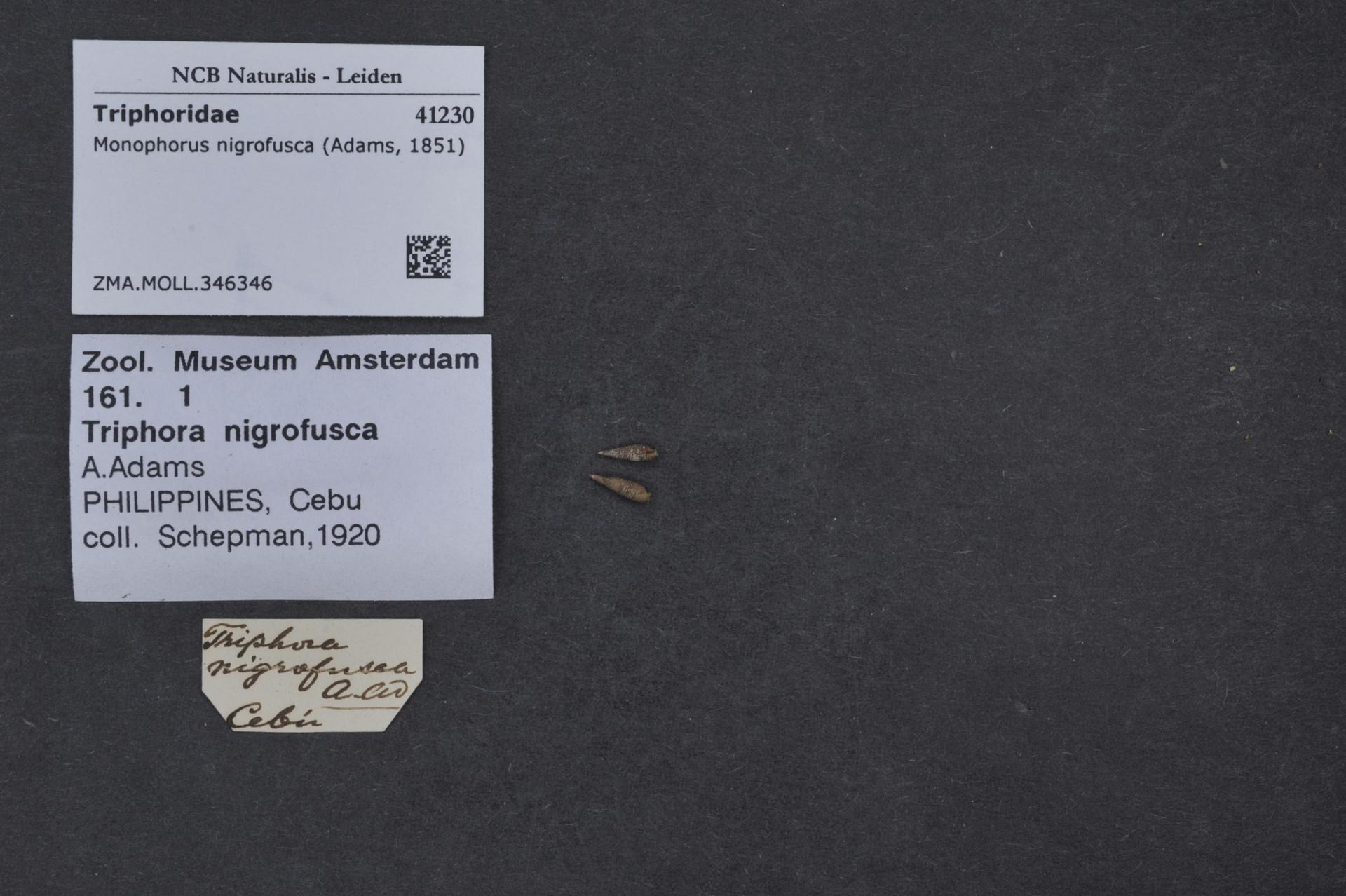
Monophorus nigrofuscus shells.

== Distribution ==
Species in this genus are found in the Mediterranean Sea and in the Atlantic Ocean around the Azores, the Canary Islands and Cape Verde.
