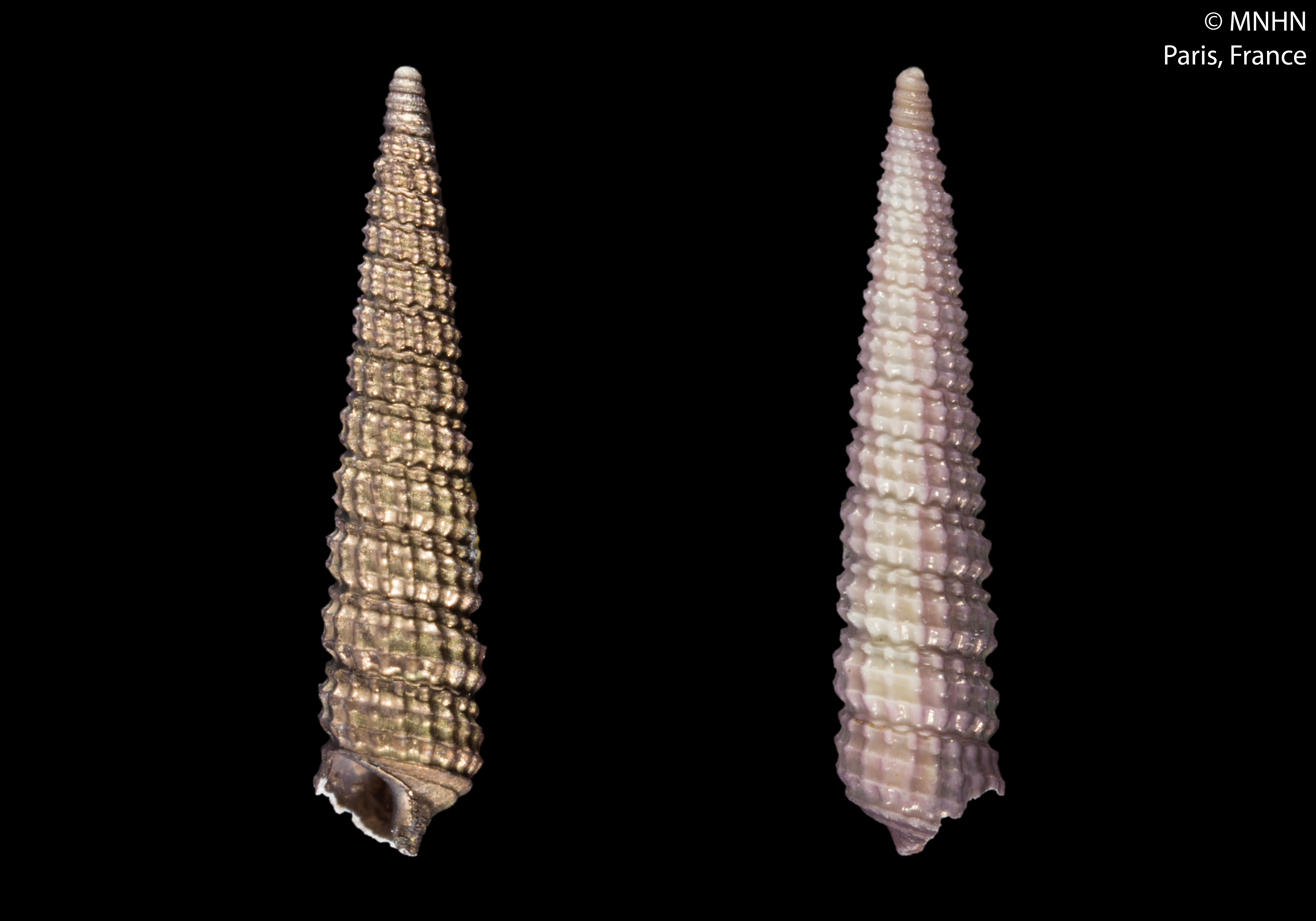
- Shell of Strobiligera delicata (holotype at MNHN, Paris)

Scientific classification
- Kingdom: Animalia
- Phylum: Mollusca
- Class: Gastropoda
- Subclass: Caenogastropoda
- Order: incertae sedis
- Superfamily: Triphoroidea
- Family: Triphoridae
- Genus: Strobiligera; Dall, 1924

Type species
- Triforis ibex Dall, 1881

Synonyms
- Triphora (Strobiligera) Dall, 1924 (original rank)

= Strobiligera =

Genus of gastropods

Strobiligera is a genus of minute sea snails with left-handed shell-coiling, marine gastropod mollusks or micromollusks in the family Triphoridae.

== Description ==
(Original description) The Protoconch larger than the succeeding whorl, swollen, smooth. The sutural sulcus is feeble. The siphonal canal is short and open.

There are numerous species in the deep water of the Antilles.

== Species ==
- Strobiligera bigemma (R. B. Watson, 1880)
- Strobiligera brychia (Bouchet & Guillemot, 1978)
- Strobiligera campista M. Fernandes & Pimenta, 2019
- Strobiligera compsa (Dall, 1927)
- Strobiligera delicata M. Fernandes & Pimenta, 2014
- Strobiligera dinea (Dall, 1927)
- Strobiligera enopla (Dall, 1927)
- Strobiligera filata (Dall, 1889)
- Strobiligera flammulata Bouchet & Warén, 1993
- Strobiligera gaesona (Dall, 1927)
- Strobiligera georgiana (Dall, 1927)
- Strobiligera ibex (Dall, 1881)
- Strobiligera inaudita (Rolán & H. G. Lee, 2008)
- Strobiligera indigena'' (Dall, 1927)
- Strobiligera lubrica Bouchet & Warén, 1993
- Strobiligera meteora (Dall, 1927)
- Strobiligera pompona (Dall, 1927)
- Strobiligera santista M. Fernandes & Pimenta, 2019
- Strobiligera sentoma (Dall, 1927)
- Strobiligera torticula (Dall, 1881)
- Strobiligera unicornium (Simone, 2006)

Synonyms

- Strobiligera inflata (R. B. Watson, 1880): synonym of Strobiligera filata (Dall, 1889)
