= Teretriphora huttoni =

Scientific classification
- Kingdom: Animalia
- Phylum: Mollusca
- Class: Gastropoda
- Subclass: Caenogastropoda
- Order: incertae sedis
- Family: Triphoridae
- Genus: Teretriphora
- Species: T. huttoni

Binomial name
- Teretriphora huttoni (Suter, 1908)

Synonyms
- Triphora huttoni Suter, 1908

Species of gastropod

Teretriphora huttoni is a species of small deepwater sea snail, a marine gastropod mollusc in the family Triphoridae.
