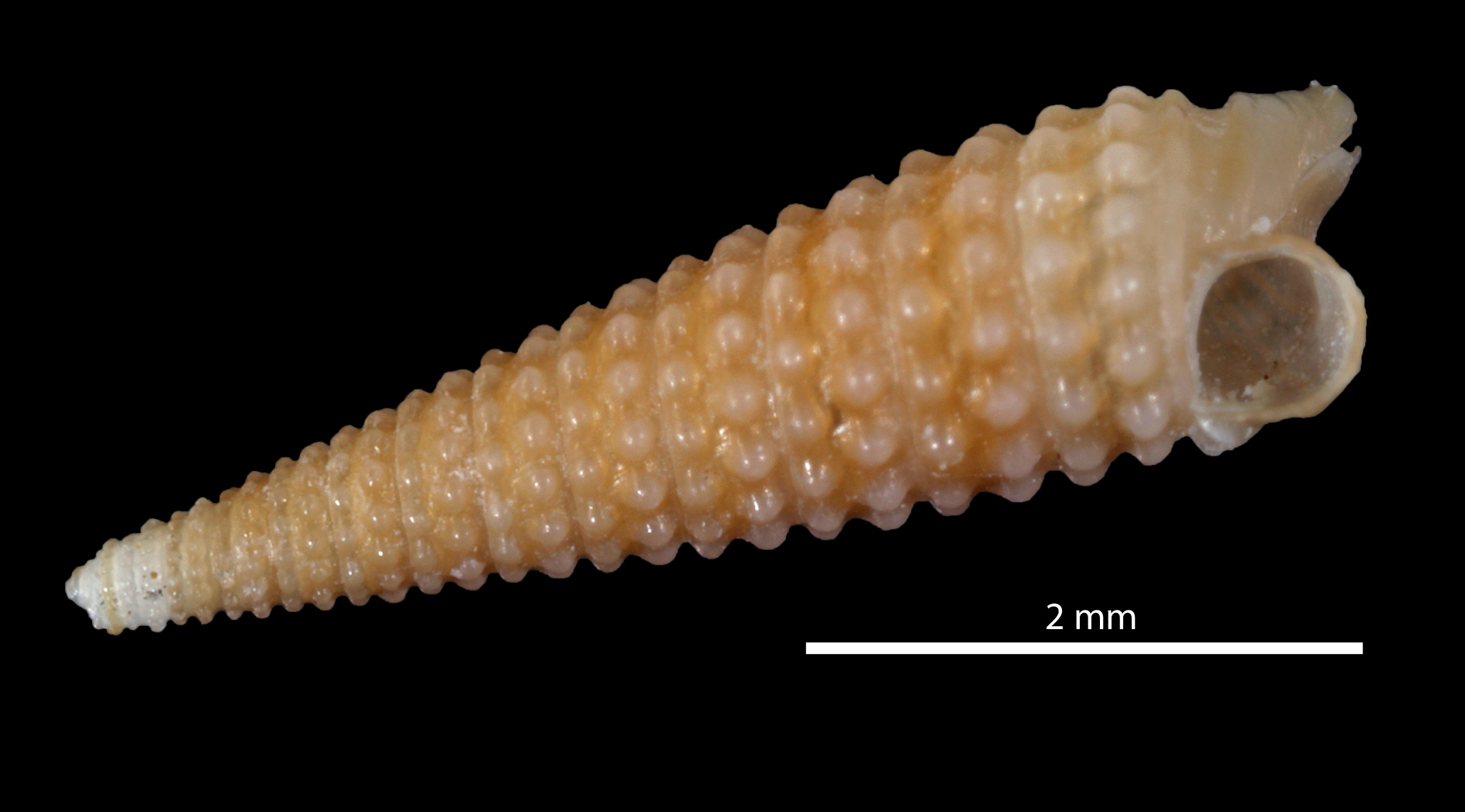
- Shell of Isotriphora onca (paratype at MNHN, Paris)

Scientific classification
- Kingdom: Animalia
- Phylum: Mollusca
- Class: Gastropoda
- Subclass: Caenogastropoda
- Order: incertae sedis
- Superfamily: Triphoroidea
- Family: Triphoridae
- Genus: Isotriphora; Cotton & Godfrey, 1931

Type species
- Triforis tasmanica Tenison Woods, 1876

= Isotriphora =

Genus of gastropods

Isotriphora is a genus of minute sea snails with left-handed shell-coiling, marine gastropod mollusks or micromollusks in the family Triphoridae.

== Species ==
- Isotriphora amethystina B. A. Marshall, 1983
- Isotriphora aureovincta (Verco, 1910)
- Isotriphora disjuncta (Verco, 1909)
- Isotriphora guanahacabibes Rolán & Fernandez-Garcés, 2008
- Isotriphora kurodai Kosuge, 1962
- Isotriphora leo M. Fernandes & Pimenta, 2020
- Isotriphora nivea (Verco, 1909)
- Isotriphora onca M. Fernandes, Pimenta & Leal, 2013
- Isotriphora peetersae (Moolenbeek & Faber, 1989)
- Isotriphora simulata B. A. Marshall, 1983
- Isotriphora taenialba Rolán & Espinosa, 1994
- Isotriphor:a tasmanica (Tenison Woods, 1876)
- Isotriphora tigrina M. Fernandes, Pimenta & Leal, 2013
- Isotriphora tricingulata Rolán & Fernández-Garcés, 2015
- Isotriphora uncia M. Fernandes & Pimenta, 2020
- Isotriphora vercoi B. A. Marshall, 1983

Species brought into synonymy

- Isotriphora bilineata Kosuge, 1962: synonym of Litharium bilineatum (Kosuge, 1962)
- Isotriphora echina Laseron, 1954: synonym of Isotriphora tasmanica (Tenison Woods, 1876)
- Isotriphora guanahacahibes: synonym of Isotriphora guanahacabibes Rolán & Fernandez-Garcés, 2008 (misspelling)
