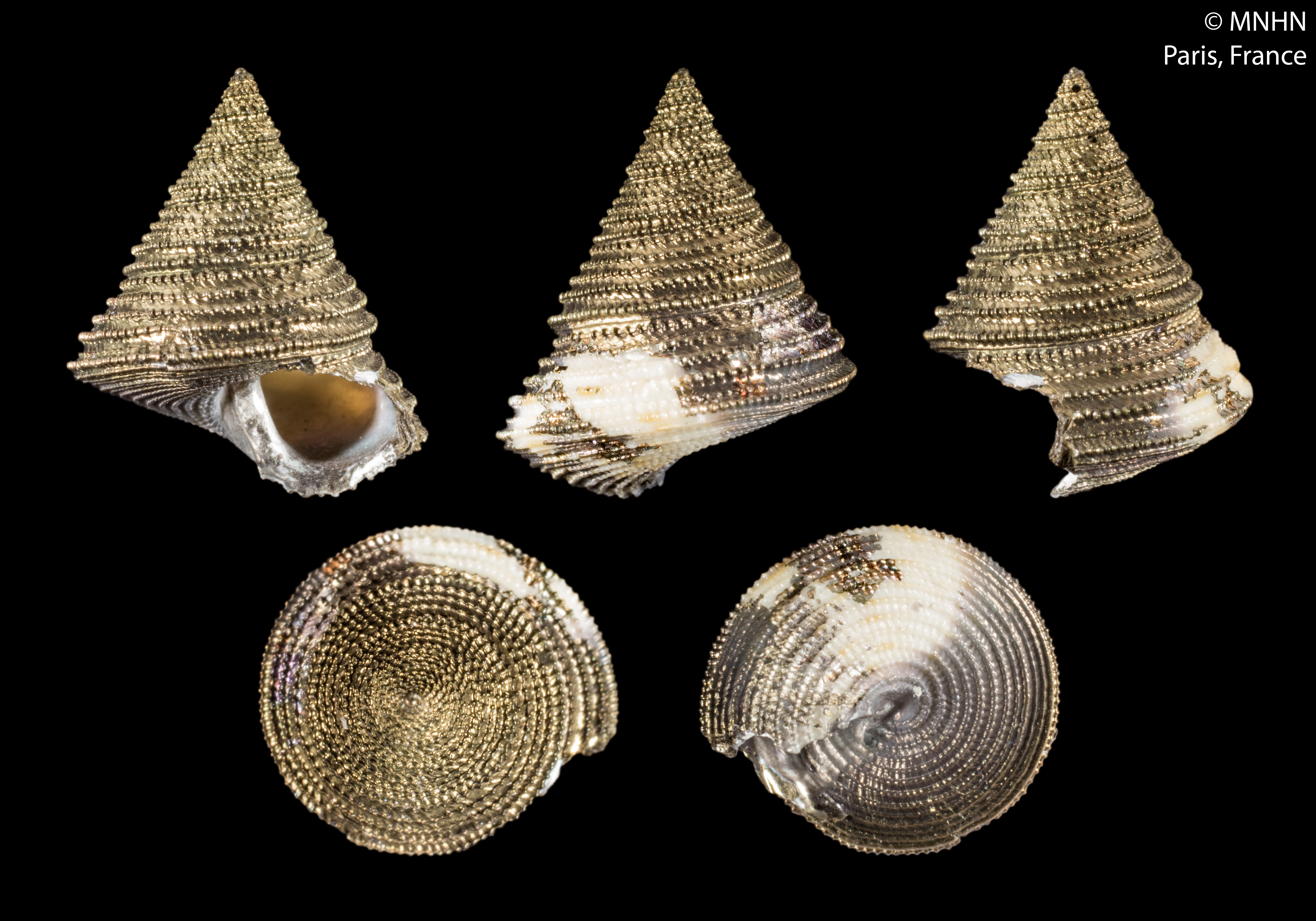
- Shell of Calliostoma pertinax (holotype at MNHN, Paris)

Scientific classification
- Kingdom: Animalia
- Phylum: Mollusca
- Class: Gastropoda
- Subclass: Vetigastropoda
- Order: Trochida
- Family: Calliostomatidae
- Genus: Calliostoma
- Species: C. pertinax

Binomial name
- Calliostoma pertinax Marshall, 1995

Synonyms
- Calliostoma (Benthastelena) pertinax Marshall, 1995

= Calliostoma pertinax =

Species of mollusc

Calliostoma pertinax is a species of sea snail, a marine gastropod mollusk in the family Calliostomatidae.

Some authors place this taxon in the subgenus Calliostoma (Benthastelena).

== Distribution ==
This species occurs in the Pacific Ocean off New Caledonia.
