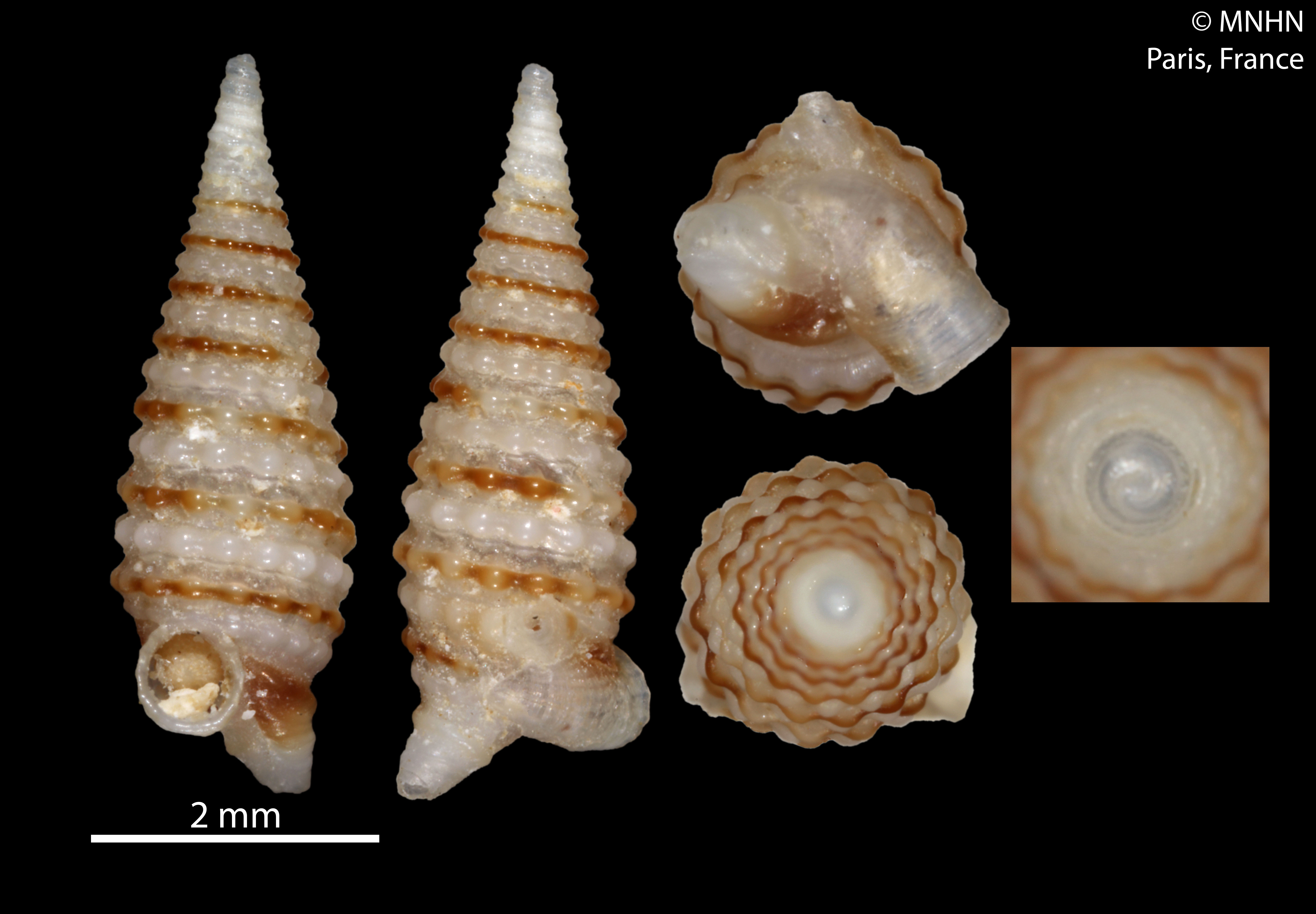
- Shell of Iniforis gudeliae (paratype at MNHN, Paris)

Scientific classification
- Kingdom: Animalia
- Phylum: Mollusca
- Class: Gastropoda
- Subclass: Caenogastropoda
- Order: incertae sedis
- Superfamily: Triphoroidea
- Family: Triphoridae
- Subfamily: Iniforinae
- Genus: Iniforis; Jousseaume, 1884

Type species
- Iniforis malvacea Jousseaume, 1884

Synonyms
- Triphora (Iniforis) Jousseaume, 1884

= Iniforis =

Genus of gastropods

Iniforis is a genus of minute sea snails with left-handed shell-coiling, marine gastropod mollusks or micromollusks in the family Triphoridae.

== Species ==
- Iniforis aemulans (Hinds, 1843)
- Iniforis albogranosa (Kosuge, 1961)
- Iniforis bellula (Kosuge, 1961)
- Iniforis calculifera (Gould, 1861)
- Iniforis carmelae Rolán & Fernández-Garcés, 1993
- Iniforis casta (Hinds, 1843)
- Iniforis distinguenda (Dunker, 1881)
- Iniforis douvillei Jousseaume, 1884
- Iniforis ducosensis (Jousseaume, 1884)
- Iniforis formosula (Hervier, 1898)
- Iniforis fusiformis (Kosuge, 1961)
- Iniforis gudeliae Rolan & Fernández-Garcés, 2009
- Iniforis hinuhinu Kay, 1979
- Iniforis ikukoae (Kosuge, 1963)
- Iniforis immaculata Rolán & Fernández-Garcés, 1993
- Iniforis limitaris Rehder, 1980
- Iniforis malvacea Jousseaume, 1884
- Iniforis ordinata Laseron, 1958
- Iniforis peleae (F. Baker & Spicer, 1935)
- Iniforis pelorcei Rolán & Fernandez-Garcés, 2009
- Iniforis perfecta (Pease, 1871)
- Iniforis poecila (Hervier, 1898)
- Iniforis porrecta Laseron, 1958
- Iniforis progressa (Laseron, 1958)
- Iniforis pseudothomae Rolán & Fernández-Garcés, 1993
- Iniforis tuberia Laseron, 1958
- Iniforis turristhomae (Holten, 1802)
- Iniforis violacea (Quoy & Gaimard, 1834)
- Iniforis zonata Laseron, 1958

Species brought into synonymy

- Iniforis chaperi (Jousseaume, 1884): synonym of Mastoniaeforis chaperi Jousseaume, 1884
- Iniforis concors (Hinds, 1843): synonym of Euthymella concors (Hinds, 1843)
- Iniforis jousseaumei (Hervier, 1898): synonym of Mastoniaeforis jousseaumei (Hervier, 1898)
- Iniforis lifuana (Hervier, 1898): synonym of Mastoniaeforis lifuana (Hervier, 1898)
- Iniforis ofuensis (F. Baker & Spicer, 1935): synonym of Mastoniaeforis ofuensis (F. Baker & Spicer, 1935)
- Iniforis speciosa (Adams & Reeve, 1850): synonym of Mastoniaeforis speciosa (A. Adams & Reeve, 1850)
- Iniforis undata (Kosuge, 1962): synonym of Mastonia undata Kosuge, 1962
- Iniforis violaceus: synonym of Iniforis violacea (Quoy & Gaimard, 1834) (incorrect gender ending)
