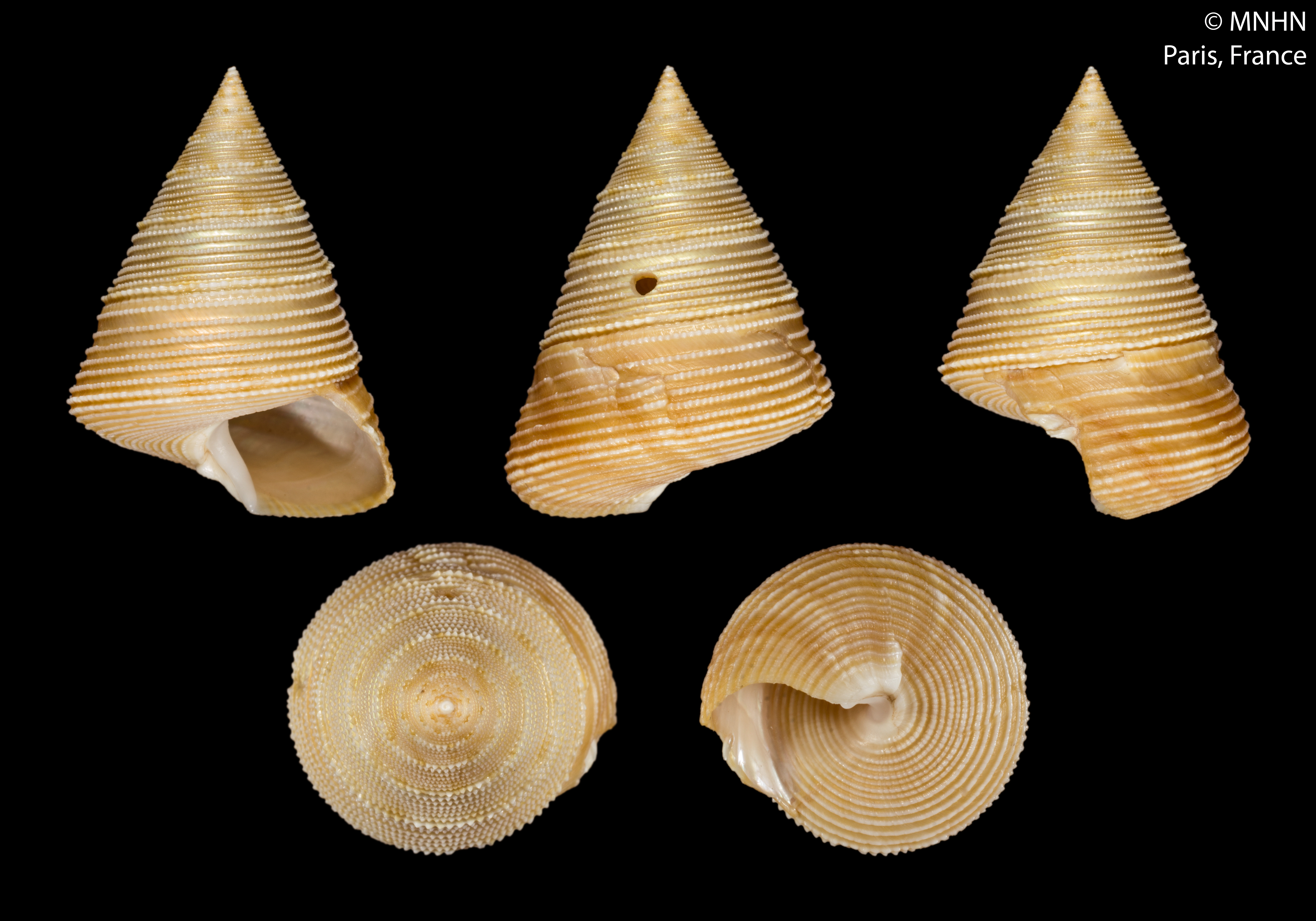
- Shell of Calliostoma peregrinum (holotype at MNHN, Paris)

Scientific classification
- Kingdom: Animalia
- Phylum: Mollusca
- Class: Gastropoda
- Subclass: Vetigastropoda
- Order: Trochida
- Family: Calliostomatidae
- Genus: Calliostoma
- Species: C. peregrinum

Binomial name
- Calliostoma peregrinum Marshall, 1995

Synonyms
- Calliostoma (Ampullotrochus) peregrinum B. A. Marshall, 1995

= Calliostoma peregrinum =

Species of sea snail

Calliostoma peregrinum is a species of sea snail, a marine gastropod mollusk in the family Calliostomatidae.

Some authors place this taxon in the subgenus Calliostoma (Ampullotrochus).

== Description ==
The height of the shell attains 25 mm.

== Distribution ==
This species occurs in the Pacific Ocean off New Caledonia.
