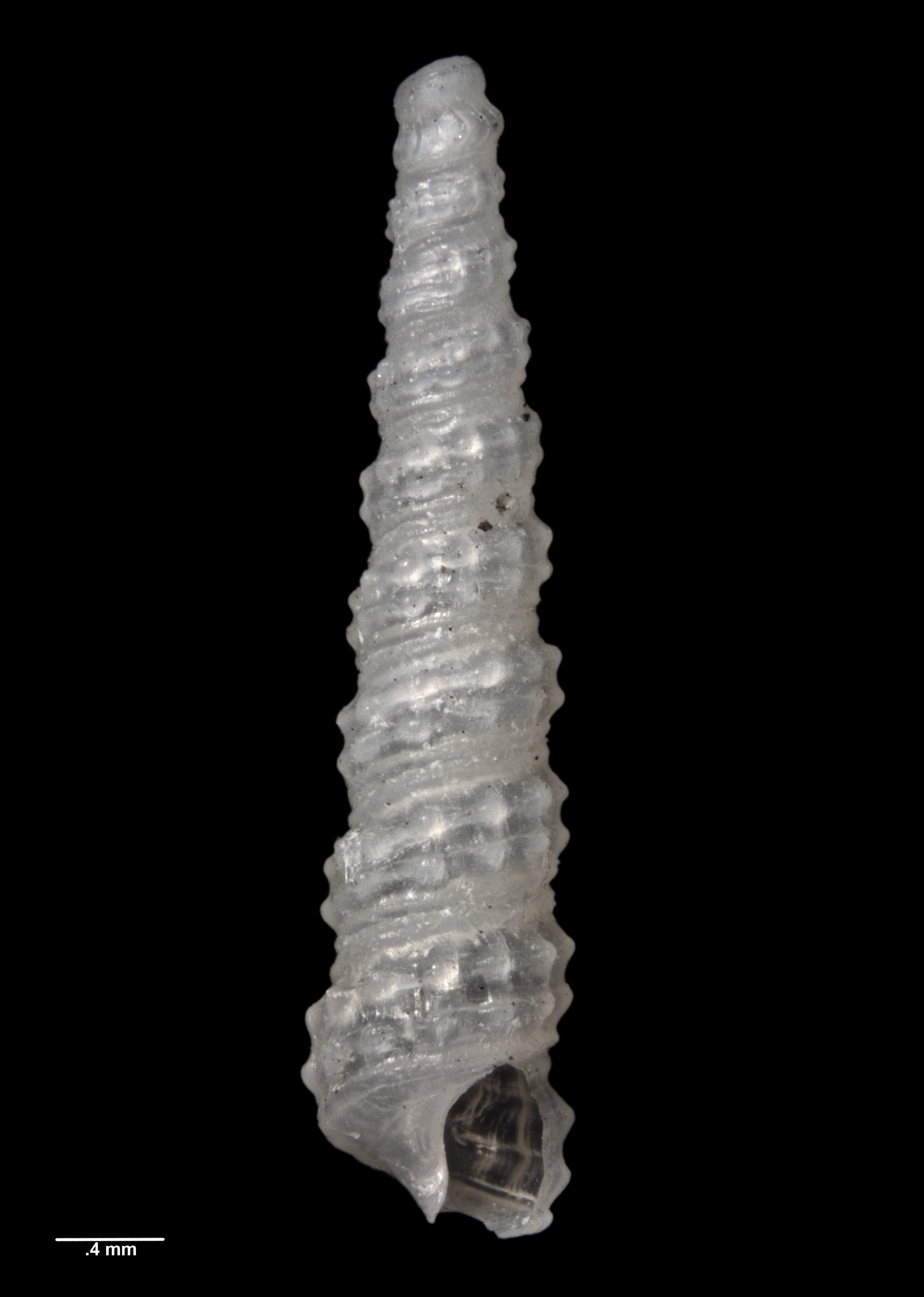

Scientific classification
- Domain: Eukaryota
- Kingdom: Animalia
- Phylum: Mollusca
- Class: Gastropoda
- Subclass: Caenogastropoda
- Clade: Hypsogastropoda
- Family: Triphoridae
- Genus: Metaxia
- Species: M. duplicarinata

Binomial name
- Metaxia duplicarinata (Powell, 1940)

Synonyms
- Mendax duplicarinata

= Metaxia duplicarinata =

Species of gastropod

Metaxia duplicarinata is a species of marine gastropod mollusc in the family Triphoridae. It was first described by Baden Powell in 1940, under the name Mendax duplicarinata. It is endemic to the waters of New Zealand.

== Description ==
Metaxia duplicarinata has a uniformly glossy white conical shell. The nuclear whorls are slightly angular. The species measures 4mm in height.

It differs from Metaxia maoria by having four instead of five spirals per whorl.

== Distribution ==
The species is Endemic to New Zealand, around Manawatāwhi / Three Kings Islands and the Bay of Islands.
