= Grandicrepidula collinae =

Scientific classification
- Kingdom: Animalia
- Phylum: Mollusca
- Class: Gastropoda
- Subclass: Caenogastropoda
- Order: Littorinimorpha
- Family: Calyptraeidae
- Genus: Grandicrepidula
- Species: G. collinae

Binomial name
- Grandicrepidula collinae Marshall, 2003

Species of gastropod

Grandicrepidula collinae is a species of sea snail, a marine gastropod mollusk in the family Calyptraeidae, the slipper snails or slipper limpets, cup-and-saucer snails, and Chinese hat snails.

== Distribution ==
This species is distributed in the Pacific Ocean along New Zealand.
