= Joculator melanoraphis =

Scientific classification
- Kingdom: Animalia
- Phylum: Mollusca
- Class: Gastropoda
- Subclass: Caenogastropoda
- Order: incertae sedis
- Family: Cerithiopsidae
- Genus: Joculator
- Species: J. melanoraphis

Binomial name
- Joculator melanoraphis Jay & Drivas, 2002

Species of gastropod

Joculator melanoraphis is a species of small sea snail, a marine gastropod mollusc in the family Cerithiopsidae. The species was described by Jay and Drivas in 2002.

Joculator melanoraphis is a marine species . Joculator melanoraphis is in the Genus Joculator and Family Cerithiopsidae, the Superfamily Triphoroidea. It can be further characterized as in the Order Caenogastropoda in the Subclass Caenogastropoda. It forms part of the Gastropoda Class, which is part of the Phylum Mollusca that is in the Kingdom Animalia. This organisms is a type of marine species with a mantle with a significant cavity used for breathing and waste, a radula and a nervous system. They have single auricle in heart, have a single pair a gill leaflets on one side of the central axis, snails and slugs, translates as stomach foot, univalve, has a mantle with a significant cavity used for breathing and excretion, most mollusks have a radula, has a nervous system, multicellular organism, eukaryote (nucleus and organelles in membrane), body plan becomes fixed eventually, excluding metamorphosis and motile.
