= Ionthoglossa =

Scientific classification
- Kingdom: Animalia
- Phylum: Mollusca
- Class: Gastropoda
- Subclass: Caenogastropoda
- Order: incertae sedis
- Family: Triphoridae
- Genus: Ionthoglossa; Bouchet, 1997

Species
- See text

Synonyms
- Pogonodon

Genus of gastropods

Ionthoglossa is a genus of minute sea snails with left-handed shell-coiling, marine gastropod mollusks or micromollusks in the family Triphoridae.

== Species ==
Species within the genus Ionthoglossa include:

- Ionthoglossa pseudocanarica (Bouchet, 1985)
