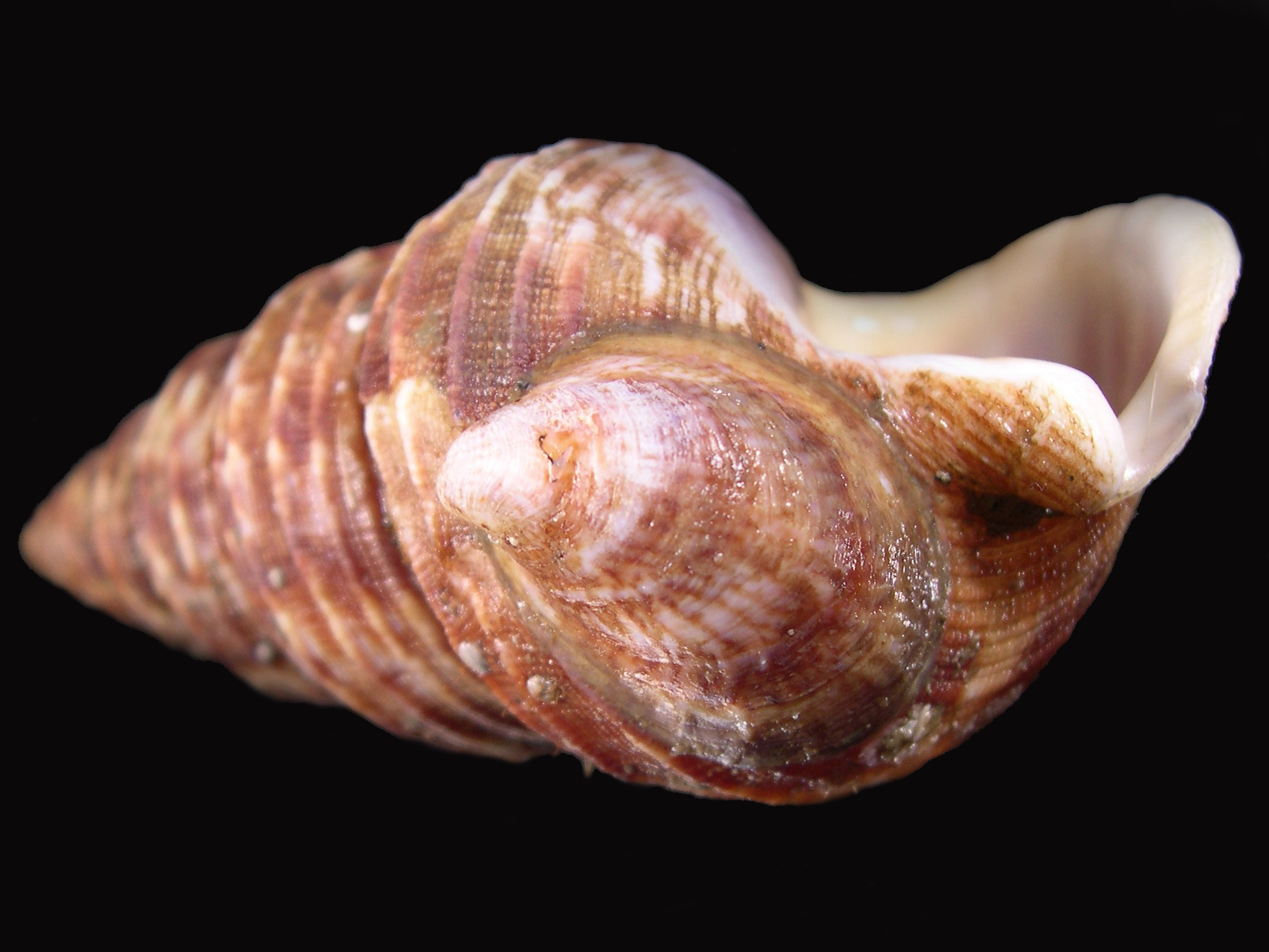
- Grandicrepidula grandis attached to Buccinum isaotakii

Scientific classification
- Kingdom: Animalia
- Phylum: Mollusca
- Class: Gastropoda
- Subclass: Caenogastropoda
- Order: Littorinimorpha
- Family: Calyptraeidae
- Genus: Grandicrepidula; J. H. McLean, 1995

Type species
- Crepidula grandis Middendorff, 1849

= Grandicrepidula =

Genus of gastropods

Grandicrepidula is a genus of sea snails, marine gastropod mollusks in the family Calyptraeidae, the slipper snails or slipper limpets, cup-and-saucer snails, and Chinese hat snails.

== Species ==
Species within the genus Grandicrepidula include:

- Grandicrepidula collinae Marshall, 2003
- Grandicrepidula grandis (Middendorff, 1849)
