= Cautor =

Scientific classification
- Kingdom: Animalia
- Phylum: Mollusca
- Class: Gastropoda
- Subclass: Caenogastropoda
- Order: incertae sedis
- Family: Triphoridae
- Genus: Cautor; Finlay, 1927

Species
- See text

Genus of gastropods

Cautor is a genus of minute sea snails, marine gastropod mollusks or micromollusks in the family Triphoridae.

== Species ==
Species within the genus Cautor are as follows:

- Cautor alveolata A. Adams & L. A. Reeve, 1850
- Cautor baculus
- Cautor conferta C. F. Laseron, 1958
- Cautor cybaeus S. Kosuge, 1962
- Cautor hungerfordi G. B. Sowerby III, 1914
- Cautor intermissa
- Cautor lanceolata S. Kosuge, 1962
- Cautor levukensis R. B. Watson, 1881
- Cautor lutea Suter, 1908
- Cautor macmichaeli S. Kosuge, 1962
- Cautor maculosa Ch. Hedley, 1903
- Cautor marceda
- Cautor marcedus C. F. Laseron, 1958
- Cautor minima W. H. Pease, 1871
- Cautor monacha Hervier, 1897
- Cautor obliqua W. L. May, 1915
- Cautor puniceus S. Kosuge, 1963
- Cautor similis W. H. Pease, 1871
- Cautor subfenestra S. Kosuge, 1962
- Cautor tubularis
- Cautor verrucosa A. Adams & L. A. Reeve, 1850
