= Teretriphora =

Scientific classification
- Kingdom: Animalia
- Phylum: Mollusca
- Class: Gastropoda
- Subclass: Caenogastropoda
- Order: incertae sedis
- Family: Triphoridae
- Genus: Teretriphora; Finlay, 1927

Species
- See text

Synonyms
- Distophora Laseron, 1958

Genus of gastropods

Teretriphora is a genus of very small sea snails, marine gastropod mollusks in the family Triphoridae.

== Species ==
Species within the genus Teretriphora include:

- Teretriphora distorta (Laseron, 1958)
- Teretriphora gemmegens (Verco, 1909)
- Teretriphora huttoni Suter, 1908
- Teretriphora novapostrema (Verco, 1910)
- Teretriphora ponderorum Marshall, 1983
- Teretriphora spica (Verco, J.C., 1909)

Species brought into synonymy

- Teretriphora kesteveni (Hedley, 1902): synonym of Latitriphora kesteveni (Hedley, 1903)
