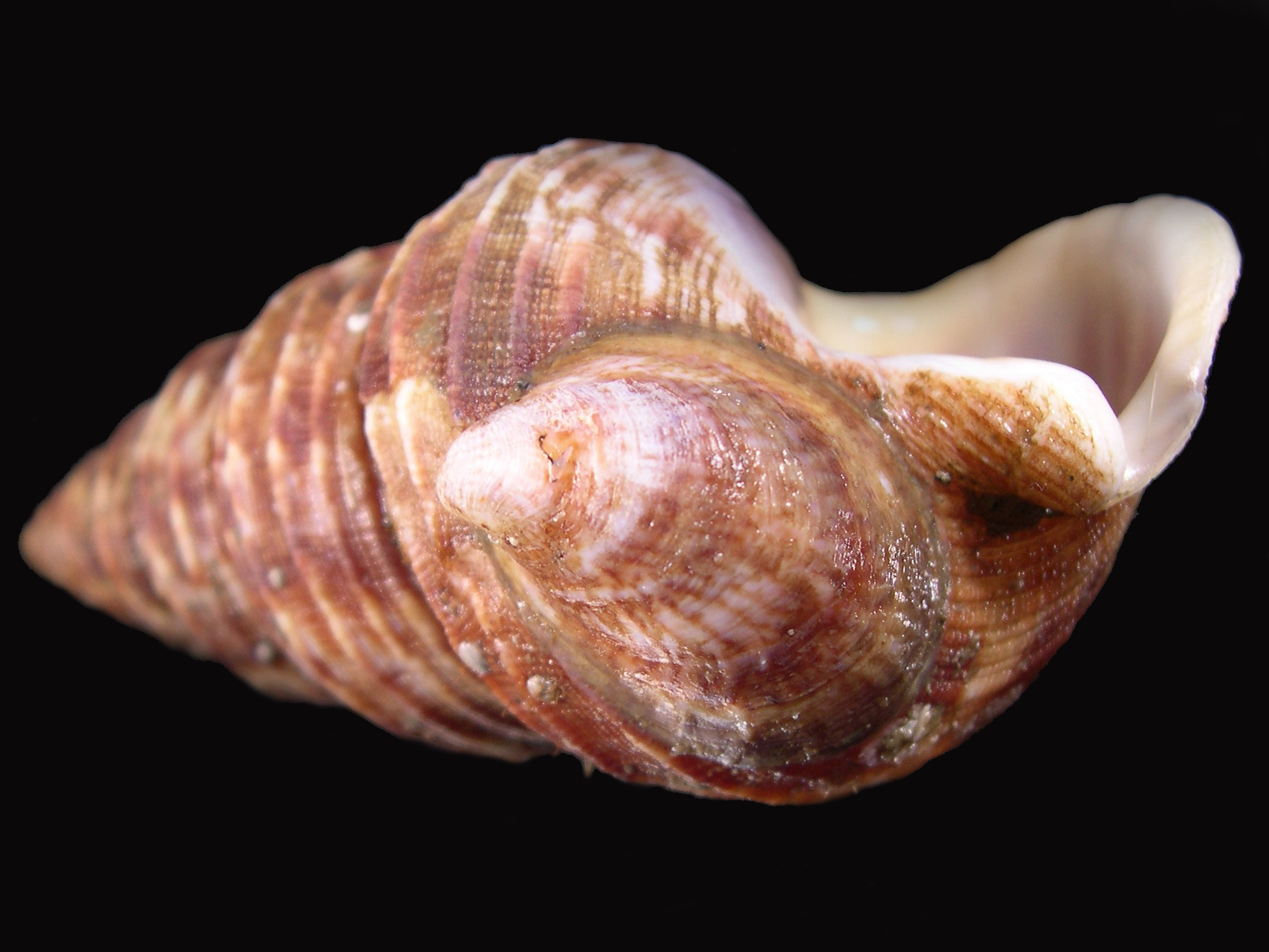
- G. grandis attached to a living Buccinum isaotakii

Scientific classification
- Kingdom: Animalia
- Phylum: Mollusca
- Class: Gastropoda
- Subclass: Caenogastropoda
- Order: Littorinimorpha
- Family: Calyptraeidae
- Genus: Grandicrepidula
- Species: G. grandis

Binomial name
- Grandicrepidula grandis (Middendorff, 1849)

Synonyms
- Crepidula grandis Middendorff, 1849 (basionym)

= Grandicrepidula grandis =

Species of gastropod

Grandicrepidula grandis, common name : the giant slipper limpet, is a species of sea snail, a marine gastropod mollusk in the family Calyptraeidae, the slipper snails or slipper limpets, cup-and-saucer snails, and Chinese hat snails.

== Distribution ==
This species is distributed in the Pacific Ocean along Japan and the Aleutians.
