= Cautor luteus =

Scientific classification
- Kingdom: Animalia
- Phylum: Mollusca
- Class: Gastropoda
- Subclass: Caenogastropoda
- Order: incertae sedis
- Family: Triphoridae
- Genus: Cautor
- Species: C. luteus

Binomial name
- Cautor luteus (Suter, 1908)

Synonyms
- Triphora luteus Suter, 1908

Species of gastropod

Cautor luteus is a species of small deepwater sea snail, a marine gastropod mollusc in the family Triphoridae.
