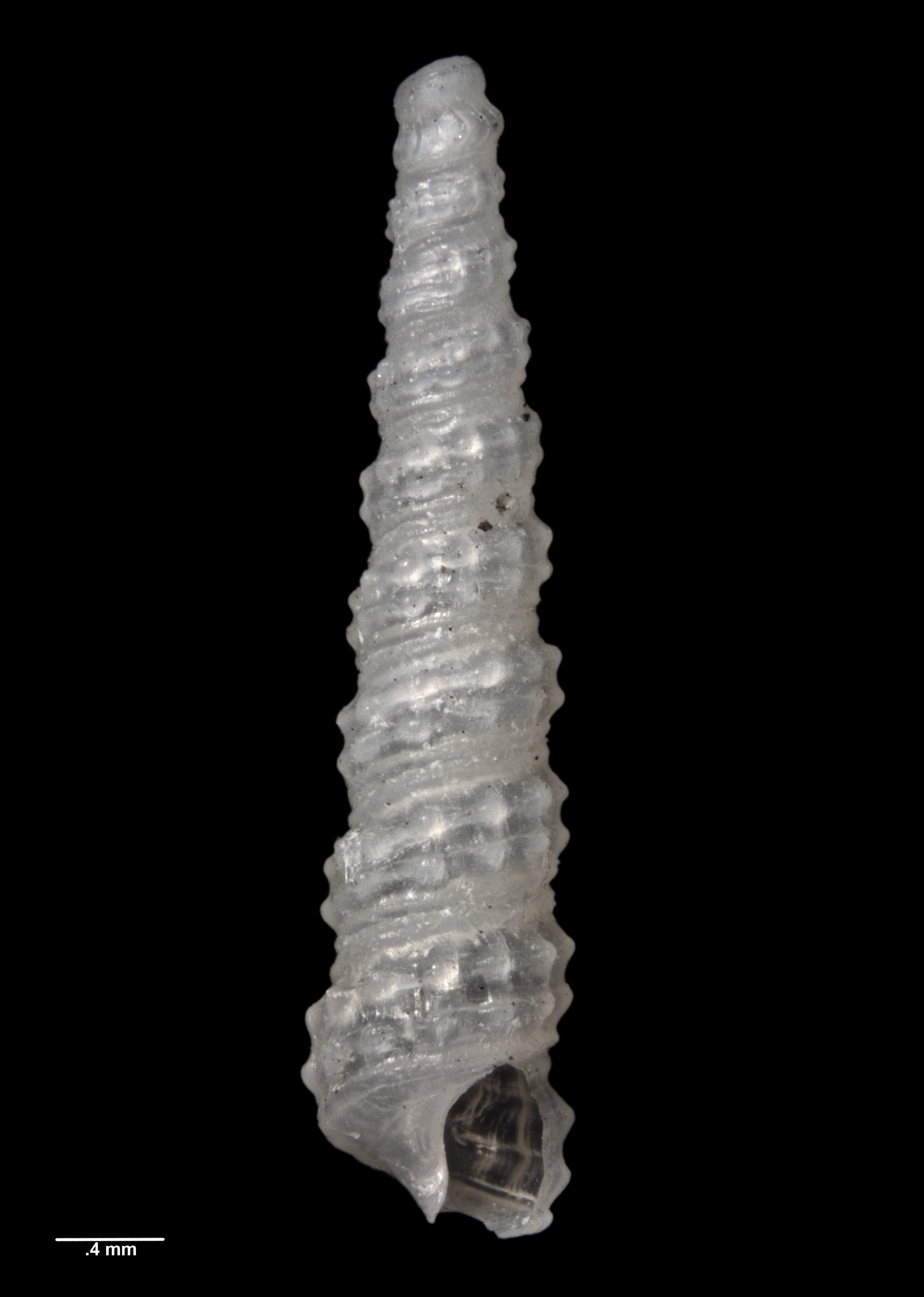
- Metaxia duplicarinata

Scientific classification
- Kingdom: Animalia
- Phylum: Mollusca
- Class: Gastropoda
- Subclass: Caenogastropoda
- Order: incertae sedis
- Family: Triphoridae
- Genus: Metaxia; Monterosato, 1884

Type species
- Murex metaxa Delle Chiaje, 1828

Species
- See text

Synonyms
- Cerithiopsis (Metaxia) Monterosato, 1884

= Metaxia =

Genus of gastropods

Metaxia is a genus of minute sea snails with right-handed shell-coiling, marine gastropod mollusks or micromollusks in the family Triphoridae, which are mostly left-handed in shell-coiling.

== Species ==
- Metaxia abrupta (Watson, 1880)
- Metaxia albicephala Kay, 1979
- Metaxia bacillum (Issel, 1869)
- Metaxia brunneopunctata Raines, 2024
- Metaxia brunnicephala Kay, 1979
- Metaxia carinapex Van der Linden, 1998
- Metaxia convexa (Carpenter, 1856)
- Metaxia diadema Bartsch, 1907
- Metaxia discus M. Fernandes, 2024
- Metaxia duplicarinata (Powell, 1940)
- Metaxia elizabethclinghamae Bakker & Swinnen, 2021
- Metaxia espinosai Rolán & Fernández-Garcés, 1992
- Metaxia exaltata (Powell, 1930)
- Metaxia excelsa Faber & Moolenbeek, 1991
- Metaxia fuscoapicata Thiele, 1930
- Metaxia gongyloskymnus Fernandes & Pimenta, 2011
- Metaxia hapax Van der Linden, 1998
- Metaxia incerta Fernandes & Rolán, 1988
- Metaxia kermadecensis B.A. Marshall, 1977
- Metaxia maoria (Finlay, 1930)
- Metaxia metaxa (delle Chiaje, 1828)
- Metaxia polynesica Rehder, 1980
- Metaxia prompta Rolán & Fernández-Garcés, 2008
- Metaxia propinqua Rolán & Fernández-Garcés, 2008
- Metaxia propria Rolán & Fernández-Garcés, 2008
- Metaxia protolineata (Laseron, 1951)
- Metaxia quadrata Faber, 2010
- † Metaxia quadrilineata (Mayer-Eymar, 1900)
- Metaxia rapaensis Cecalupo & Perugia, 2022
- Metaxia rugulosa (C. B. Adams, 1850)
- Metaxia solitaria B.A. Marshall, 1979
- Metaxia taeniolata (Dall, 1889)
- Metaxia tricarinata (Pease, 1861)
- Metaxia vicina (C. B. Adams, 1850)

Species brought into synonymy

- Metaxia bacilla [sic] : synonym of Metaxia bacillum (Issel, 1869) (misspelling of Metaxia bacillum (Issel, 1869) )
- Metaxia exilis (C. B. Adams, 1850): synonym of Metaxia excelsa Faber & Moolenbeek, 1991
- Metaxia metaxae (delle Chiaje, 1828) : synonym of Metaxia metaxa (delle Chiaje, 1828)
