= Costatophora =

Scientific classification
- Kingdom: Animalia
- Phylum: Mollusca
- Class: Gastropoda
- Subclass: Caenogastropoda
- Order: incertae sedis
- Family: Triphoridae
- Genus: Costatophora; Marshall, 1994

Synonyms
- Brucetriphora Beu, 2004

Genus of gastropods

Costatophora is a genus of gastropods belonging to the family Triphoridae.

The species of this genus are found in Australia and Malesia.

Species:

- Costatophora borealis (Laseron, 1958)
- Costatophora granifera (Brazier, 1894)
- Costatophora iniqua (Jousseaume, 1898)
- Costatophora mapoonensis (Laseron, 1958)
- Costatophora mcgilpi (Cotton, 1953)
- Costatophora pallida (Kosuge, 1962)
- Costatophora princeps (G.B.Sowerby Iii, 1904)
- Costatophora pulcherrima Darragh, 2017
- Costatophora serana (P.J.Fischer, 1927)
