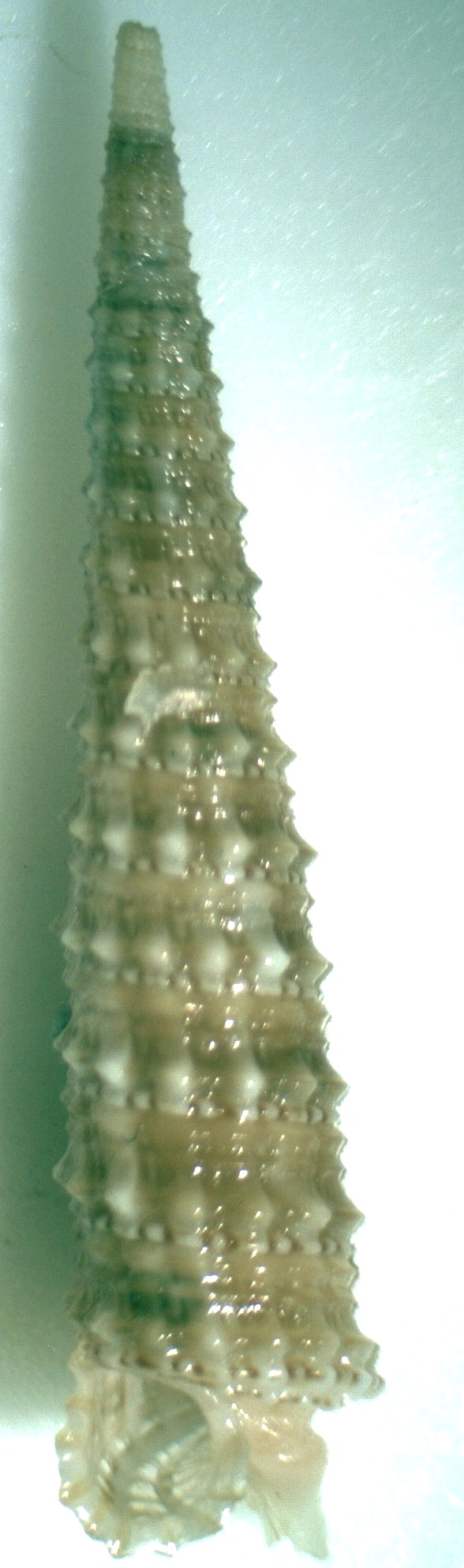
- A shell of Inella pyramidalis

Scientific classification
- Kingdom: Animalia
- Phylum: Mollusca
- Class: Gastropoda
- Subclass: Caenogastropoda
- Order: incertae sedis
- Family: Triphoridae
- Genus: Inella; Bayle, 1879

Type species
- Triphoris gigas Hinds, 1843

Species
- See text

Synonyms
- Cerithium (Ino) Hinds, 1844; Ino Hinds, 1843 (invalid: junior homonym of Ino Schrank, 1803 [Crustacea]; Inella is a replacement name); Norephora Gründel, 1975 junior subjective synonym; Triforis (Inella) Bayle, 1879 superseded rank; Triforis (Ino) Hinds, 1843; Triphora (Inella) Bayle, 1879 superseded rank; Triphora (Norephora) Gründel, 1975 junior subjective synonym; Triphoris (Ino) Hinds, 1843

= Inella (gastropod) =

Genus of gastropods

Inella is a genus of minute sea snails with left-handed shell-coiling, marine gastropod molluscs in the family Triphoridae.

== General characteristics ==
(Original description in Latin) The shell is cylindrical, elongated, and tapers to a sharp point.

== Species ==
Species in the genus Inella include:

- Inella acicula Laseron, 1958
- Inella aculeata Kosuge, 1962
- Inella alba (Fenaux, 1943)
- † Inella alia Landau, Ceulemans & Van Dingenen, 2018
- † Inella ambigua (Deshayes, 1864)
- † Inella aoteaensis (P. Marshall & Murdoch, 1920)
- Inella asperrima (Hinds, 1843)
- Inella apexbilirata Rolán & Fernández-Garcés, 2008
- Inella asperrima (Hinds, 1843)
- Inella basalis (Odhner, 1922)
- † Inella bentae Landau, Bakker & C. M. Silva, 2023
- Inella blainvilli Jousseaume, 1884
- Inella carinata Marshall, 1983
- Inella chrysalis Kosuge, 1963
- Inella colon (Dall, 1881)
- † Inella cordata Lozouet, 1999
- † Inella cristulata (Sacco, 1895)
- † Inella dauciformis Darragh, 2017
- Inella differens Rolán & Lee, 2008
- † Inella elatior (Koenen, 1891)
- Inella euconfio M. Fernandes & Pimenta, 2019
- Inella faberi Rolán & Fernández-Garcés, 2008
- Inella faceta M. Fernandes & Pimenta, 2019
- Inella galo M. Fernandes & Pimenta, 2019
- Inella gemmulata (A. Adams & Reeve, 1850)
- Inella gigas (Hinds, 1843)
- † Inella granulata (Strauch, 1967) (accepted > unreplaced junior homonym, not Triphora granulata A. Adams & Reeve, 1850)
- Inella harryleei Rolán & Fernández-Garcés, 2008
- † Inella herouvallensis (de Raincourt, 1877)
- † Inella herouvallensis (de Raincourt, 1877)
- Inella hervieri (Kosuge, 1962)
- Inella ile Jousseaume, 1898
- † Inella indrai (Beets, 1941)
- Inella intercalaris Marshall, 1983
- Inella intermedia (Dall, 1881)
- Inella japonica Kuroda & Kosuge, 1963
- † Inella javana (K. Martin, 1899)
- Inella kimblae Marshall, 1983
- Inella lanceolata Kosuge, 1962
- Inella leucocephala M. Fernandes & Pimenta, 2019
- Inella longissima (Dall, 1881)
- Inella lutaoi C.-K. Chang, 2006
- Inella maculata M. Fernandes & Pimenta, 2019
- † Inella maharatai (Beets, 1941)
- Inella mariei Jousseaume, 1884
- * Inella micans (Hinds, 1843)
- † Inella minuata (Deshayes, 1864)
- † Inella moniliferata Darragh, 2017
- Inella multitecta Kosuge, 1962
- Inella noduloides Rolán & Fernández-Garcés, 2008
- Inella numerosa Jousseaume, 1898
- Inella obliqua (May, 1915)
- Inella obtusa Marshall, 1983
- Inella pagoda (Hinds, 1843)
- Inella pavimenta (Laseron, 1958)
- Inella perimensis Jousseaume, 1898
- Inella pinarena Espinosa, Ortea, Fernandez-Garcés & Moro, 2007
- Inella planaria Kosuge, 1974
- † Inella pliocaenica (Marquet, 1996)
- Inella pseudolongissima Rolán & Fernández-Garcés, 2008
- Inella pseudotorticula Rolán & Lee, 2008
- Inella recta (E. A. Smith, 1890)
- † Inella roddai (Ladd, 1972)
- † Inella rolani Landau, Ceulemans & Van Dingenen, 2018
- Inella rossiteri Jousseaume, 1884
- Inella ryosukei (Kosuge, 1963)
- Inella sagamiensis (Kuroda & T. Habe, 1971)
- Inella sarissa (Dall, 1889)
- Inella sculpta (Hinds, 1843)
- Inella sentoma (Dall, 1927)
- Inella slapcinskyi Rolán & Fernández-Garcés, 2008
- Inella spicula Kosuge, 1962
- Inella spina (Verco, 1909)
- Inella spinosa M. Fernandes, 2024
- Inella triserialis (Dall, 1881)
- Inella undebermuda Rolán & Lee, 2008
- † Inella vandermarki Marquet, 1996
- Inella vanilla M. Fernandes & Pimenta, 2019
- Inella verluysi (Schepman, 1909)
- Inella verrucosa (Adams & Reeve, 1850) (nomen dubium)
- Inella vittata (Hinds, 1843)
- † Inella zeattenuata Beu, 1970
- † Inella zespina (Laws, 1939)

The website Gastropods.com also includes the following species :

- Inella clathratus (Gould, A.A., 1861)
- Inella distorta (Laseron, C.F., 1958)
- Inella hungerfordi (Sowerby, G.B. III, 1914)
- Inella iniqua (Jousseaume, F.P., 1884)
- Inella mistura (Laseron, C.F., 1958)
- Inella monovitta (Laseron, C.F., 1958)
- Inella multigyrata Yokoyama, M., 1920
- Inella pyramidalis (Adams, A. & L.A. Reeve, 185 0)
- Inella rushii (Dall, W.H., 1889)

== Synonyms ==
- Inella bigemma (Watson, 1880): synonym of Strobiligera bigemma(R. B. Watson, 1880) (superseded combination)
- Inella compsa (Dall, 1927): synonym of Strobiligera compsa (Dall, 1927)
- Inella dinea (Dall, 1927): synonym of Strobiligera dinea (Dall, 1927)
- Inella enopla (Dall, 1927): synonym of Strobiligera enopla (Dall, 1927) (superseded combination)
- Inella gaesona (Dall, 1927): synonym of Strobiligera gaesona (Dall, 1927)
- Inella granicostata Kosuge, 1962: synonym of Latitriphora granicostata (Kosuge, 1962) (original combination)
- Inella inflata (Watson, 1880): synonym of Strobiligera inflata (R. B. Watson, 1880)
- Inella maxillaris (Hinds, 1843): synonym of Latitriphora maxillaris (Hinds, 1843)
- Inella meteora (Dall, 1927): synonymù of Strobiligera meteora (Dall, 1927)
- Inella pompona (Dall, 1927): synonym of Strobiligera pompona (Dall, 1927) (superseded combination)
- Inella subfenestrata Kosuge, 1962: synonym of Subulophora subfenestra (Kosuge, 1962)
- Inella torticula (Dall, 1881): synonym of Strobiligera torticula (Dall, 1881)
- Inella unicornium Simone, 2006: synonym of Strobiligera unicornium (Simone, 2006) (original combination)
