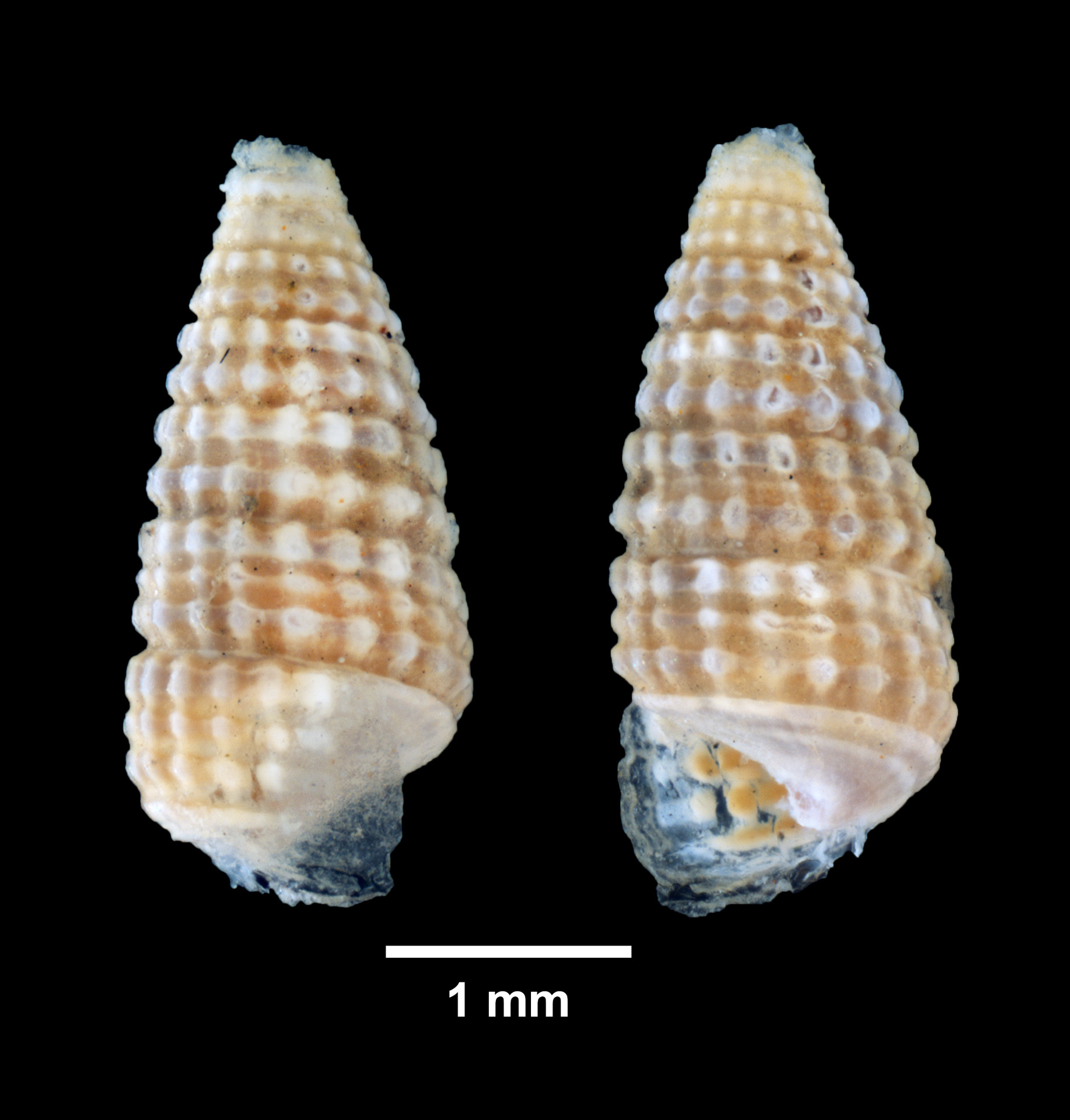
- Marshallora nigrocincta

Scientific classification
- Kingdom: Animalia
- Phylum: Mollusca
- Class: Gastropoda
- Subclass: Caenogastropoda
- Order: incertae sedis
- Family: Triphoridae
- Genus: Marshallora; Bouchet, 1985

= Marshallora =

Genus of sea snails

Marshallora is a genus of gastropods belonging to the family Triphoridae.

The genus has almost cosmopolitan distribution.

Species:

- Marshallora adversa (Montagu, 1803)
- Marshallora bubistae F.Fernandes & Rolán, 1988
- Marshallora gutta F.Fernandes & Rolán, 1988
- Marshallora mariangelae F.Fernandes & Rolán, 1988
- Marshallora modesta (C.B.Adams, 1850)
- Marshallora nicaraguensis Rolán & Luque, 1999
- Marshallora nichupte Rolán & Cruz-Abrego, 1996
- Marshallora nigrocincta (C.B.Adams, 1839)
- Marshallora ostenta Rolán & Fernández-Garcés, 2008
