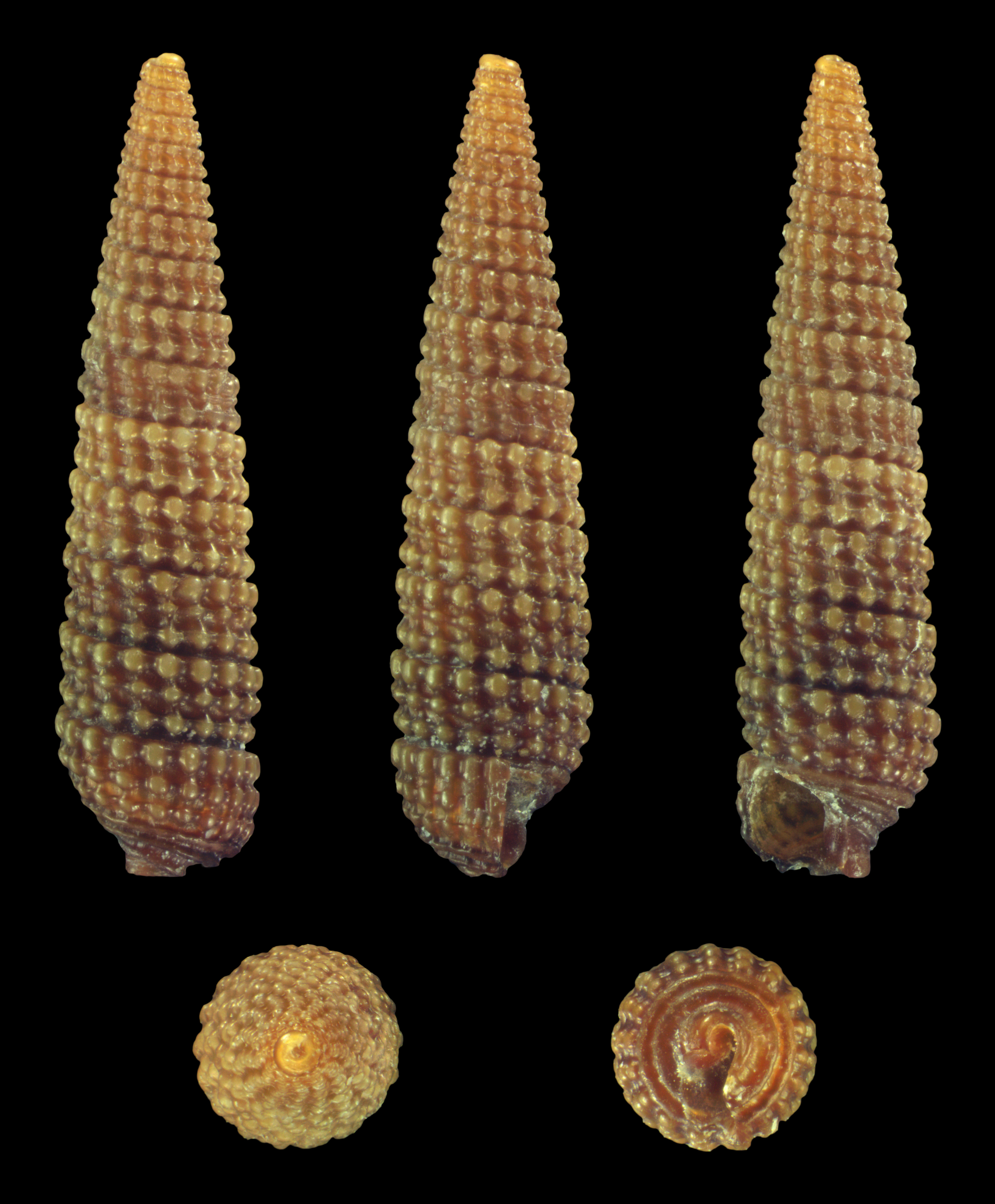
- Dorsal view of a shell of Monophorus perversus

Scientific classification
- Kingdom: Animalia
- Phylum: Mollusca
- Class: Gastropoda
- Subclass: Caenogastropoda
- Order: incertae sedis
- Family: Triphoridae
- Genus: Monophorus
- Species: M. perversus

Binomial name
- Monophorus perversus (Linnaeus, 1758)

= Monophorus perversus =

Species of gastropod

Monophorus per versus is a species of small sea snail with left-handed shell-coiling, a marine gastropod mollusc or micromollusc in the family Triphoridae.

== Distribution ==
The species is found in the Azores, around Great Britain and in European waters including the Mediterranean Sea.

== Description ==
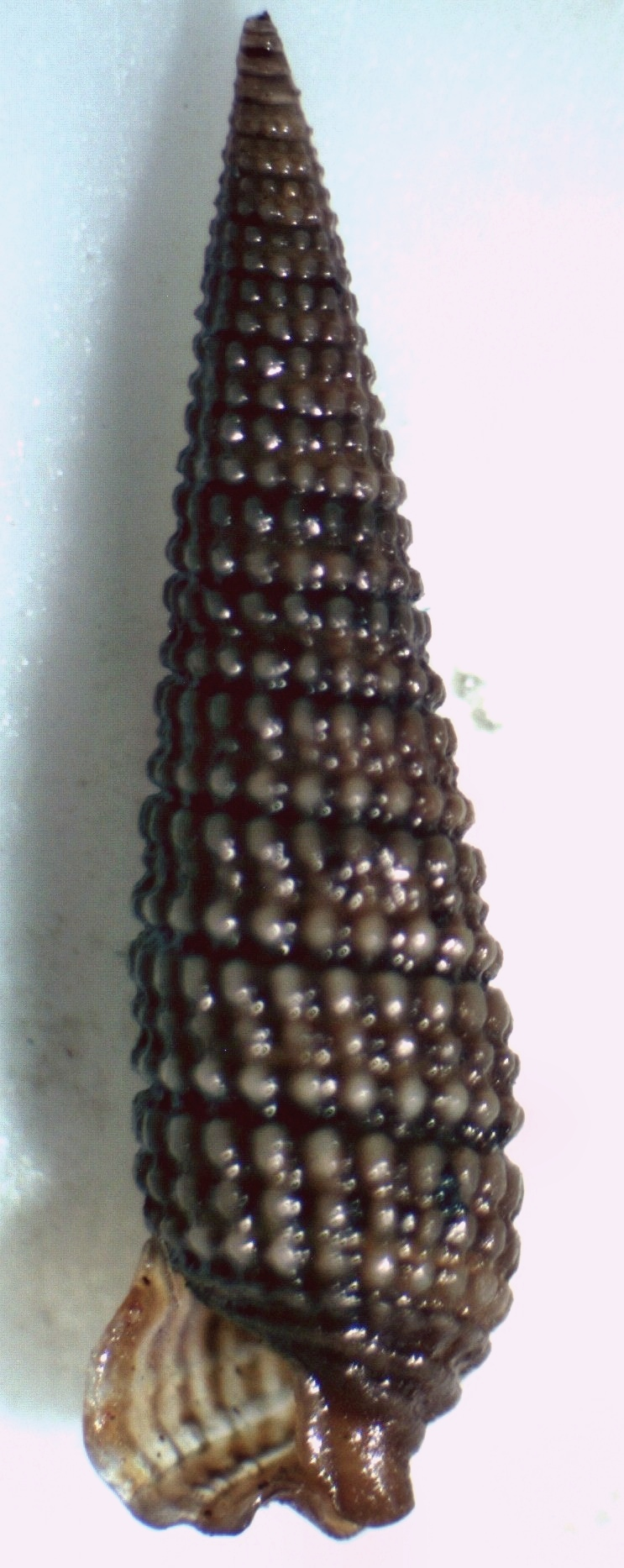
Apertural view
