= Bruce Marshall (taxonomist) =

New Zealand taxonomist

- Born: 29 March 1948
- Known for: Naming many New Zealand mollusca
- Awards: Lifetime Achievement award from the Malacological Society of Australasia
- Scientific career
- Fields: Malacology, taxonomy
- Workplaces: Museum of New Zealand Te Papa Tongarewa, University of Wellington (DSc 2012)

Bruce Anders Marshall (born 29 March 1948) is a New Zealand taxonomist and malacologist. He is an expert on New Zealand mollusca and has named hundreds of species and genera.

== Academic career ==
He is a self-taught malacologist and started working at the Museum of New Zealand Te Papa Tongarewa in 1976.

Until 2019, he was the Collection Manager of Molluscs at the Te Papa Tongarewa, where he described the largest number of new species in the history of the museum, describing and naming 584 species and genera.

In 2012 he was awarded a Doctor of Science degree by Victoria University of Wellington. The conferment letter described him as "the leading authority on the taxonomy and systematics of living molluscs in New Zealand".

In 2018 he was awarded the Lifetime Achievement award by the Malacological Society of Australasia.

== Taxa named in Marshall's honour ==
As of 2019, 24 species and 6 genera had been named after him. The genera are:

- Bruceiella Warén & Bouchet, 1993
- Bruceina Özdikmen, 2013
- Brucetriphora Beu, 2004
- Marshallaskeya Gründel, 1980
- Marshallopsis Cecalupo & Perugia, 2012
- Marshallora Bouchet, 1985
