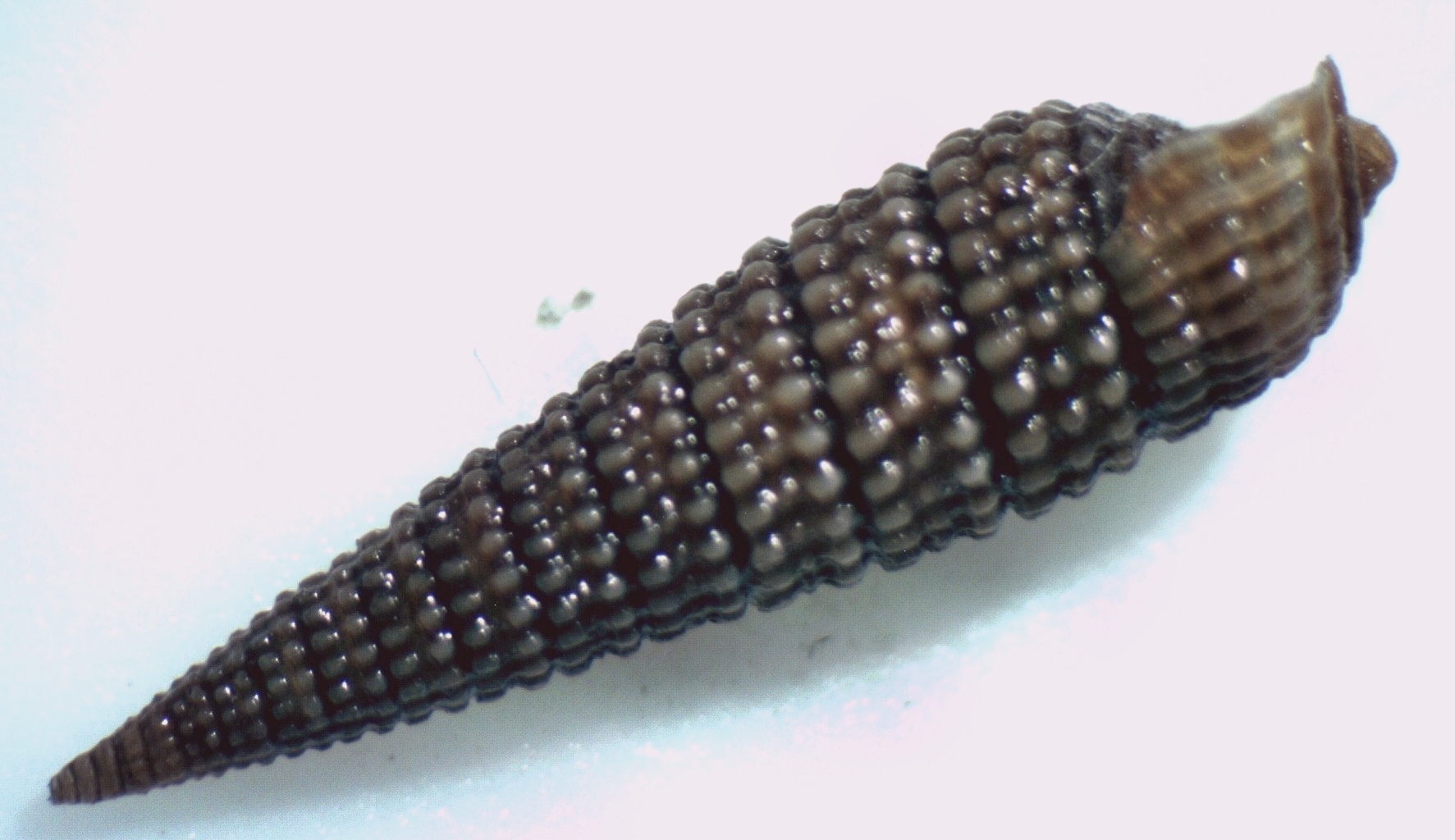
- Dorsal view of a shell of Monophorus perversus in the Triphoridae

Scientific classification
- Kingdom: Animalia
- Phylum: Mollusca
- Class: Gastropoda
- Subclass: Caenogastropoda
- Order: incertae sedis
- Superfamily: Triphoroidea
- Family: Triphoridae; J.E. Gray, 1847

Synonyms
- Iniforinae Kosuge, 1966· accepted, alternate representation; Metaxiinae B. A. Marshall, 1977· accepted, alternate representation; Triforidae (Misspelling); Triphorinae Gray, 1847· accepted, alternate representation

= Triphoridae =

Family of gastropods

Triphoridae is a family of very small sea snails, marine gastropod molluscs in the informal group Ptenoglossa, within the clade Hypsogastropoda. Almost all the species in this family are micromollusks and almost all are left-handed in shell-coiling.

== Distribution ==
Species of this family can be found worldwide, but the major part occurs in the Indo-Pacific Region. Most species live between the intertidal zone and offshore to a depth between 200 m to 500 m (exceptionally below 1,000 m).

== Shell description ==
The shells of triphorids are small (between 2 mm and 10 mm - exceptionally 50 mm) and extremely high-spired, with numerous narrow whorls which often have distinctive sculpture. The majority of species in this family are left-handed or sinistral.

== Taxonomy ==
Facts about their taxonomy are rather scant, complicated by the high diversity and the intra- and inter-specific variability of the species. Most triphorid collections available in Museums of Natural History are still undescribed.

The following subfamilies were recognized in the taxonomy of Bouchet & Rocroi of 2005:

- Iniforinae Kosuge, 1966
- Metaxiinae Marshall, 1977
- Triphorinae Gray, 1847

Gründel (1975), stated that the correct family name is Triforidae Jousseaume, 1884 and not Triphoridae, but this is only true when the genera Triforis and Triphora are placed in the same family (Kosuge, 1976). Marshall (1980) however stated that the two genera need to be placed in two different families: the Triforidae and the Triphoridae. WoRMS do not recognise these 3 subfamilies and consider them alternative representation of Triphoridae.

== Genera ==
Genera within the family Triphoridae include:

- Aclophora Laseron, 1958
- Aclophoropsis Marshall, 1983
- Bouchetriphora Marshall, 1983
- Cautor Finlay, 1927
- Cautotriphora Laws, 1940
- Cheirodonta Marshall, 1983
- Coriophora Laseron, 1958
- Cosmotriphora Olsson and Harbison, 1953
- Costatophora B. A. Marshall, 1994
- Differoforis Kosuge, 2008
- Euthymella Thiele, 1929
- Eutriphora Cotton & Godfrey, 1931
- Hedleytriphora Marshall, 1983
- Hypotriphora Cotton & Godfrey, 1931
- Inella Bayle, 1879
- Iniforis Jousseaume, 1884
- Isotriphora Cotton & Godfrey, 1931
- Latitriphora Marshall, 1983
- Liniphora Laseron, 1958
- Litharium Dall, 1924
- Magnosinister Laseron, 1954
- Marshallora Bouchet, 1985
- Mastonia Hinds, 1843
- Mastoniaeforis Jousseaume, 1884
- Metaxia Monterosato, 1884
- Monophorus Grillo, 1877
- Nanaphora Laseron, 1958
- Nototriphora Marshall, 1983
- Obesula Jousseaume, 1897
- Opimaphora Laseron, 1958
- Pogonodon Bouchet, 1997
- Sagenotriphora B.A. Marshall, 1983
- Seilarex Iredale, 1924
- Similiphora Bouchet, 1985
- Strobiligera Dall, 1924
- Subulophora Laseron, 1958
- Sychar Hinds, 1843
- Talophora Gründel, 1975
- Teretriphora Finlay, 1927
- Triphora Blainville, 1828
- Viriola Jousseaume, 1884
- Viriolopsis Marshall, 1983

Genera brought into synonymy

- Biforina Bucquoy, Dautzenberg & Dollfus, 1884 : synonym of Monophorus Grillo, 1877
- Brucetriphora Beu, 2004: synonym of Costatophora B. A. Marshall, 1994
- Distophora Laseron, 1958:synonym of Cautor Finlay, 1927
- Epiforis Laseron, 1958:synonym of Mastoniaeforis Jousseaume, 1884
- Euthymia Jousseaume, 1884:synonym of Euthymella Thiele, 1929
- Ino Hinds, 1843:synonym of Inella Bayle, 1879
- Macrosinister:synonym of Magnosinister Laseron, 1954
- Mastoniaeformis [sic] : synonym of Mastoniaeforis Jousseaume, 1884
- Mesophora Laseron, 1958: synonym of Coriophora Laseron, 1958
- Notosinister Finlay, 1926: synonym of Monophorus Grillo, 1877
- Orbitophora Laseron, 1958:synonym of Viriola Jousseaume, 1884
- Risbecia Kosuge, 1966:synonym of Differoforis Kosuge, 2008
- Sinistroseila W. R. B. Oliver, 1915: synonym of Viriola Jousseaume, 1884
- Solosinister Laseron, 1954:synonym of Viriola Jousseaume, 1884
- Tetraphora Laseron, 1958:synonym of Brucetriphora Beu, 2004
- Torresophora Laseron, 1958: synonym of Euthymella Thiele, 1929
- Triforis Deshayes, 1834:synonym of Triphora Blainville, 1828
- Triphoris:synonym of Triphora Blainville, 1828
