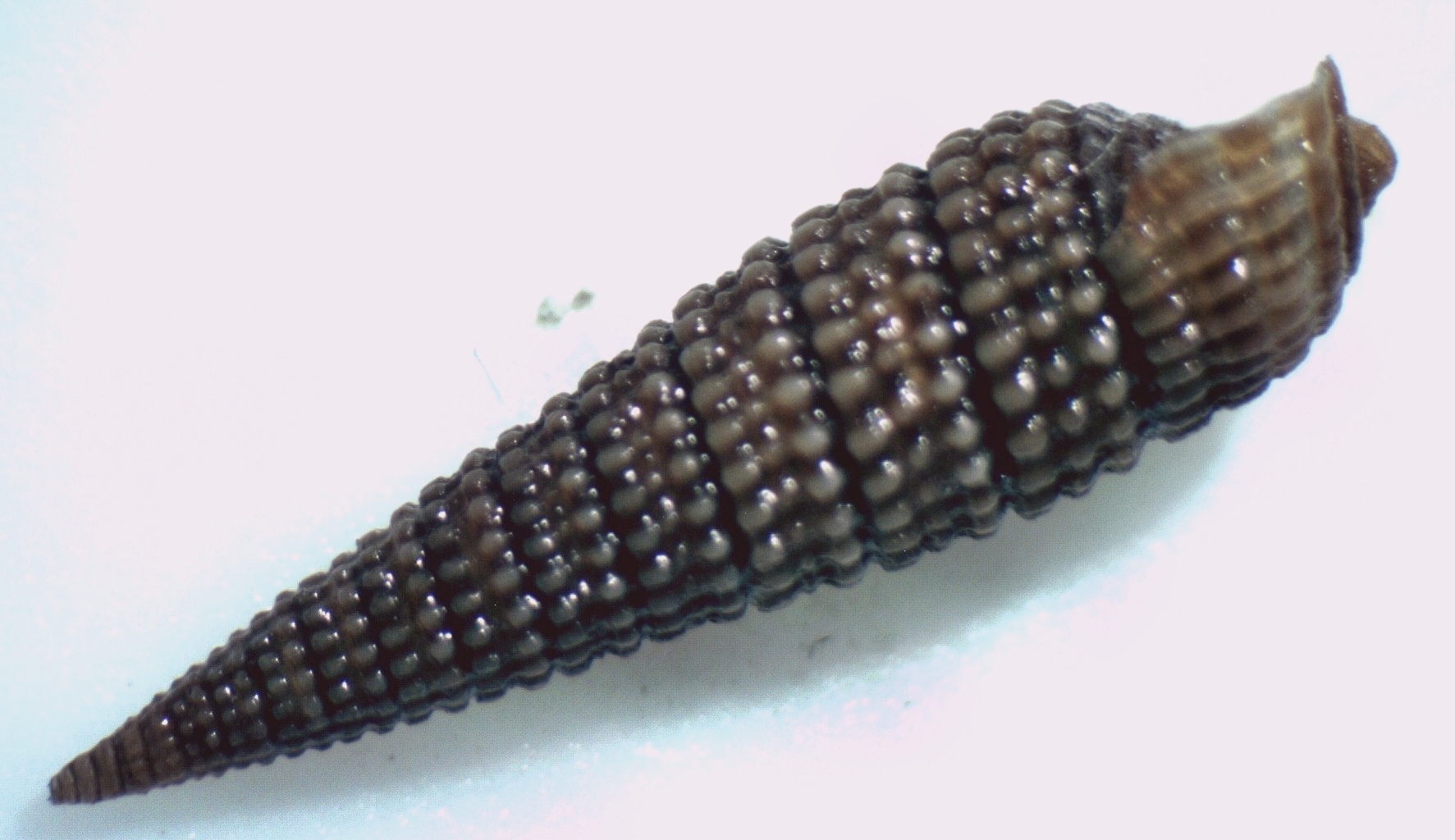
- Dorsal view of a shell of Monophorus perversus in the Triphoridae

Scientific classification
- Kingdom: Animalia
- Phylum: Mollusca
- Class: Gastropoda
- Subclass: Caenogastropoda
- Order: incertae sedis
- Superfamily: Triphoroidea; J.E. Gray, 1847

= Triphoroidea =

Superfamily of gastropods

Triphoroidea is a superfamily of small sea snails, marine gastropod molluscs or micromolluscs within the informal group Ptenoglossa.

== Taxonomy ==
Families and subfamilies within this superfamily are as follows:

- † Berendinellidae Guzhov, 2005
- Cerithiopsidae H. Adams & A. Adams, 1853
- Newtoniellidae Korobkov, 1955
- Triphoridae J.E. Gray, 1847

Families brought into synonymy

- Eumetulidae synonym of Newtoniellidae
- Triforidae synonym of Triphoridae
