= Conorbis =

Scientific classification
- Kingdom: Animalia
- Phylum: Mollusca
- Class: Gastropoda
- Subclass: Caenogastropoda
- Order: Neogastropoda
- Superfamily: Conoidea
- Family: Conorbidae
- Genus: †Conorbis; Swainson, 1840

Species
- See text

Extinct genus of gastropods

Conorbis is an extinct genus of sea snails, marine gastropod mollusks in the family Conorbidae.

This genus was formerly classified in the family Conidae by Vredenburg (1921) in the clade Neogastropoda by Sepkoski (2002) and in the subfamily Conorbiinae by Harzhauser (2007).

Conorbis is the type genus of the family Conorbidae. The type species of the genus Conorbis is extinct. Species in this genus lack nadules.

== Species ==
Species within the genus Conorbis include:

- † Conorbis aequipartitus (Cossmann, 1889) - "Catalogue Illustré des Coquilles Fossiles de l'Éocène des Environs de Paris. (4ème fascicule). Annales de la Société Royale Malacologique de Belgique, 24: 3 -385 "; Middle-Miocene fossil species from France
- † Conorbis alatoideus (Aldrich, 1885) - "Notes on the Tertiary of Alabama and Mississippi, with descriptions of new species. The Journal of the Cincinnati Society of Natural History, 8 (2 ): 145 -153"; Type Locality: Moody's Branch, Mississippi
- † Conorbis alatus (Edwards, 1856) - "Descriptions of Shells from the Older Tertiaries of England. A Monograph of the Eocene Mollusca, or descriptions of shells from the older Tertiaries of England. Part III, No. II. Prosobranchiata (continued), 3 (2 )"
- † Conorbis aliger (Tracey & Todd, 1996) - "Nomenclatural changes for some Bracklesham gastropods. Tertiary Research, 16: 41 -54"
- † Conorbis amphiconus (J. de C. Sowerby, 1850) - "The Geology and Fossils of the Tertiary and Cretaceous Formations of Sussex"
- † Conorbis bhagothorensis (Vredenburg, 1925) - fossil species from the Oligocene in Pakistan
- † Conorbis dormitor (Solander, 1766) - originally described as Conus dormitor, it was renamed Conorbis dormitor by Swainson in 1840; Oligo-Miocene fossil species from the Lower Indus Valley in Pakistan.
- † Conorbis protensus (Michelotti, 1861) - originally described as Pleurotoma protensa, it was renamed by Sacco in 1893 and confirmed by Harzhauser in 2007; this fossil species is found in the Oligocene in Italy and Oman.
- † Conorbis sindiensis (Vredenburg, 1925) - fossil species from the Early Miocene in Pakistan.
- † Conorbis veselovi (Amitrov, 2008)

Species brought into synonymy

- Conorbis adamii (Bozzetti, 1994): synonym of Genotina adamii (Bozzetti, 1994)
- † Conorbis atractoides (Tate 1890): synonym of † Benthofascis atractoides (Tate 1890)
- Conorbis coromandelicus (E. A. Smith, 1894): synonym of Pseudoconorbis coromandelicus] (E.A. Smith, 1894), synonym of Conasprella coromandelica (E. A. Smith, 1894)
- † Conorbis otwayensis Long, 1981: synonym of † Benthofascis. otwayensis Long, 1981 (Oligocene of Australia)
