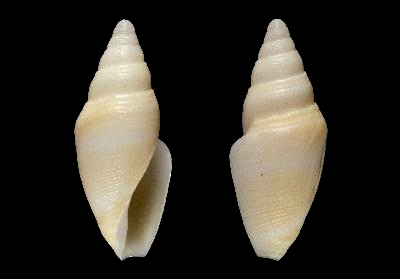
- Shell of Benthofascis angularis (holotype at the MNHN, Paris)

Scientific classification
- Kingdom: Animalia
- Phylum: Mollusca
- Class: Gastropoda
- Subclass: Caenogastropoda
- Order: Neogastropoda
- Superfamily: Conoidea
- Family: Conorbidae
- Genus: Benthofascis
- Species: B. angularis

Binomial name
- Benthofascis angularis Tucker, Tenorio & Stahlschmidt, 2011

= Benthofascis angularis =

Species of gastropod

Benthofascis angularis is a species of sea snail, a marine gastropod mollusk in the family Conorbidae.

These snails are predatory and venomous. They are capable of "stinging" humans, therefore live ones should be handled carefully or not at all.

== Description ==
Benthofascis angularis has a small shell with a ovate-fusiform shape, with yellow and white bands. The teleoconch has three of these coloured spirals, with the midbody and anterior spirals occasionally fusing into one. The protoconch has around double the number of spirals the teleoconch has, although they are much finer. The shell is covered in spiral grooves, which are widely spaced on the posterior half of the shell and more tightly spaced on the anterior. The operculum is leaf shaped and has a nucleus that is terminally located, and is large enough to cover most of the apertural opening. It is most similar in appearance to Benthofascis lozoueti. The length of an adult shell attains 27 mm, its diameter 11.1 mm.

== Distribution ==
This marine species is endemic to Australia and occurs off Southwestern Australia, specifically near Esperance where the holotype was first discovered.

== Habitat ==
Maximum recorded depth is 30 m, however, it commonly found from 12 to 15 m deep. This is considered quite shallow for a Benthofascis sp. as the majority of them are found in deeper waters.
