= Benthofascis otwayensis =

Scientific classification
- Kingdom: Animalia
- Phylum: Mollusca
- Class: Gastropoda
- Subclass: Caenogastropoda
- Order: Neogastropoda
- Superfamily: Conoidea
- Family: Conorbidae
- Genus: Benthofascis
- Species: B. otwayensis

Binomial name
- Benthofascis otwayensis (Long, 1981)

Synonyms
- Conorbis otwayensis Long, 1981

Extinct species of gastropod

Benthofascis otwayensis is an extinct species of sea snail, a marine gastropod mollusk in the family Conorbidae.

== Description ==
It was originally described as a subspecies of Benthofascis atractoides, but it is wider bodied and its geologic history extends to the Oligocene instead of the Miocene for B. atractoides.

== Distribution ==
This extinct marine species is endemic to Oligocene of Victoria, Australia
