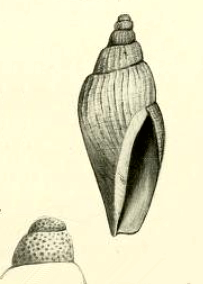
- Teleochilus royanus

Scientific classification
- Kingdom: Animalia
- Phylum: Mollusca
- Class: Gastropoda
- Subclass: Caenogastropoda
- Order: Neogastropoda
- Superfamily: Conoidea
- Family: Raphitomidae
- Genus: Teleochilus; Harris, 1897

Type species
- † Daphnella gracillina Tenison Woods, 1876

Species
- See text

Synonyms
- Litachilus Powell, A.W.B. 1944

= Teleochilus =

Genus of gastropods

Teleochilus is a genus of sea snails, marine gastropod mollusks in the family Raphitomidae.

== Description ==
(Original description) The protoconch is large, with 1½ depressed whorls, spirally and longitudinally striated from the initial portion onwards, the spiral striae developing into well-defined sulcations as the shell passes from the brephic to the neanic stages of growth.

The shell as a whole is elongate, the aperture being much longer relatively than, the spire. The whorls are slightly convex and spirally sulcated throughout, the lines of growth well-marked. The suture is typically canaliculate. The aperture shows a thin, erect, outer lip, constricted posteriorly, and broad towards the anterior. The columella is plain, with a thin deposit of callus through which the sulci appear.

It is difficult to satisfactorily classify this genus. By its general configuration it has considerable analogy with Daphnella, but may be easily differentiated by the unique characteristics of the protoconch, and the absence of a posterior sinus. The last-mentioned circumstance might be taken advantage of to remove Teleochilus from the Pleurotomidae, did we not know that the possession of a sinus is not an absolutely necessary qualification for inclusion in that family.

In some respects Teleochilus recalls certain forms of Mitra, but it has no columellar plications, nor even the semblance of a fold. Whilst its protoconch is distinctive. At the same time, it approaches the genus Dilaphus, Philippi, which, although deprived of folds on the columella, is classified with the Mitridae, chiefly on anatomical grounds.

The soft parts of the animal were first described by Mr. A. Garrett, who was unable to detect any difference between them and those of Cylindra, Schumacher. Unfortunately, it is not possible to ascertain the relationships of Teleochilus in the same manner, as its soft parts are denied to us. On conchological considerations alone it is included in Pleurotomidae, and may be assigned a position in the neighbourhood of Daphnella.

== Species ==
Species within the genus Teleochilus include:

- † Teleochilus balcombensis A. W. B. Powell, 1944
- † Teleochilus comptus A. W. B. Powell, 1944
- † Teleochilus denseliratus A. W. B. Powell, 1944
- † Teleochilus duplicatus A. W. B. Powell, 1944
- † Teleochilus gracillimus (Tenison Woods, 1877)
- Teleochilus royanus Iredale, 1924

Species brought into synonymy

- Teleochilus biconicus Hedley, 1903: synonym of Benthofascis biconica (Hedley, 1903)
- Teleochilus sarcinulum Hedley, 1905: synonym of Benthofascis sarcinula (Hedley, 1905)
