= Artemidiconus =

Scientific classification
- Kingdom: Animalia
- Phylum: Mollusca
- Class: Gastropoda
- Subclass: Caenogastropoda
- Order: Neogastropoda
- Family: Conorbidae
- Genus: Artemidiconus da Motta, 1991

Type species
- Conus selenae van Mol, Tursch & Kempf, 1967

Species
- See text

Genus of gastropods

Artemidiconus is a monospecific genus of sea snails, marine gastropod mollusks in the family Conorbidae.

Like other species in the superfamily Conoidea these snails are predatory and venomous, able to inject neurotoxins into their prey with their radula.

This genus was added to the family Conorbidae by Tucker & Tenorio (2009).

== Species ==
The only known species within the genus Artemidiconus is:

- Artemidiconus selenae (van Mol, Tursch & Kempf, 1967)

Synonyms

- † Artemidiconus granularis (Borson, 1820): synonym of † Hemiconus granularis (Borson, 1820) (superseded combination)
- Artemidiconus yemanjae (Van Mol, Tursch & Kempf, 1967): synonym of Artemidiconus selenae (Van Mol, Tursch & Kempf, 1967)
