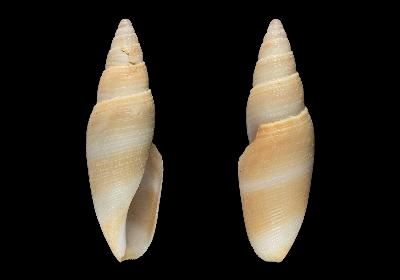
- Shell of Benthofascis pseudobiconica (holotype in the MNHN, Paris)

Scientific classification
- Kingdom: Animalia
- Phylum: Mollusca
- Class: Gastropoda
- Subclass: Caenogastropoda
- Order: Neogastropoda
- Superfamily: Conoidea
- Family: Conorbidae
- Genus: Benthofascis
- Species: B. pseudobiconica

Binomial name
- Benthofascis pseudobiconica Tucker, Tenorio & Stahlschmidt, 2011

= Benthofascis pseudobiconica =

Species of gastropod

Benthofascis pseudobiconica is a species of sea snail, a marine gastropod mollusc in the family Conorbidae.

These snails are predatory and venomous. They are capable of "stinging" humans, therefore live ones should be handled carefully or not at all. They were first described in 2011.

== Description ==
The length of an adult shell varies between 12.8 mm and 42.4 mm, its diameter is between 5.7 mm and 14.9 mm.

== Distribution ==
This marine species is endemic to Australia and occurs off Northern Queensland.
