= Artemidiconus selenae =

- Shell of Artemidiconus selenae (specimen at the Natural History Museum, Rotterdam)

Scientific classification
- Kingdom: Animalia
- Phylum: Mollusca
- Class: Gastropoda
- Subclass: Caenogastropoda
- Order: Neogastropoda
- Superfamily: Conoidea
- Family: Conorbidae
- Genus: Artemidiconus
- Species: A. selenae

Binomial name
- Artemidiconus selenae ( Van Mol, Tursch & Kempf, 1967)

Synonyms
- Artemidiconus yemanjae (Van Mol, Tursch & Kempf, 1967); Conus selenae van Mol, Tursch & Kempf, 1967 (basionym); Conus yemanjae Van Mol, Tursch & Kempf, 1967

Species of gastropod

Artemidiconus selenae is a species of sea snail, a marine gastropod mollusk in the family Conorbidae.

These snails are predatory and venomous. They are capable of stinging humans, therefore live ones should be handled carefully or not at all.

== Description ==
The size of an adult shell varies between 7 mm and 19 mm.

== Distribution ==
This species occurs in the Atlantic Ocean off Northern Brazil.

== Description ==
The maximum recorded shell length is 19 mm.

== Habitat ==
Minimum recorded depth is 18 m. Maximum recorded depth is 135 m.
