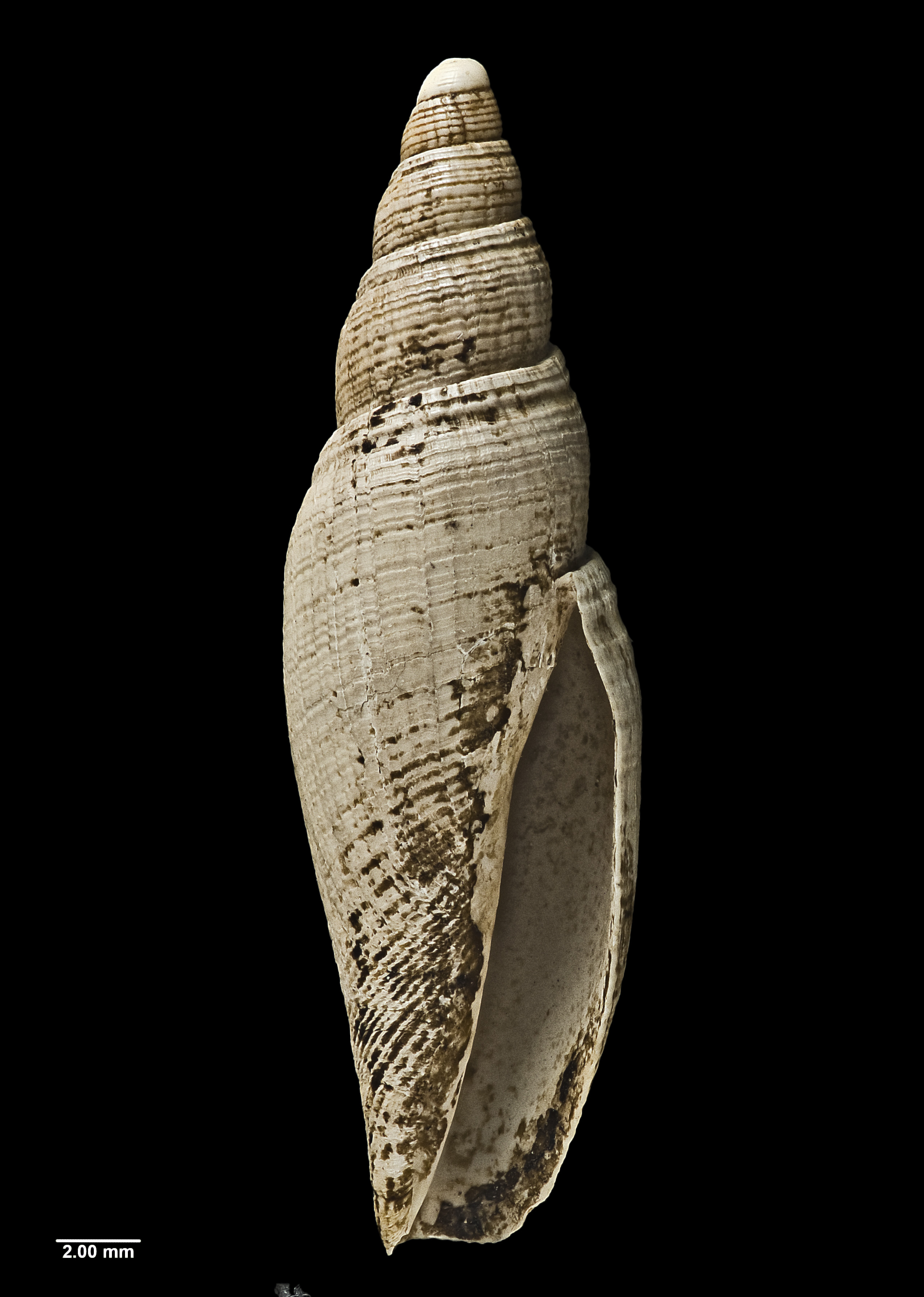
- Holotype from Auckland War Memorial Museum

Scientific classification
- Kingdom: Animalia
- Phylum: Mollusca
- Class: Gastropoda
- Subclass: Caenogastropoda
- Order: Neogastropoda
- Family: Raphitomidae
- Genus: Teleochilus
- Species: †T. denseliratus

Binomial name
- †Teleochilus denseliratus Powell, 1944

= Teleochilus denseliratus =

Teleochilus denseliratus Temporal range: middle Miocene

Extinct species of gastropod

Teleochilus denseliratus is an extinct species of sea snail, a marine gastropod mollusc in the family Raphitomidae. Fossils of the species date to the middle Miocene, and have been found in strata of the Otway Basin of South Australia and Victoria.

== Description ==
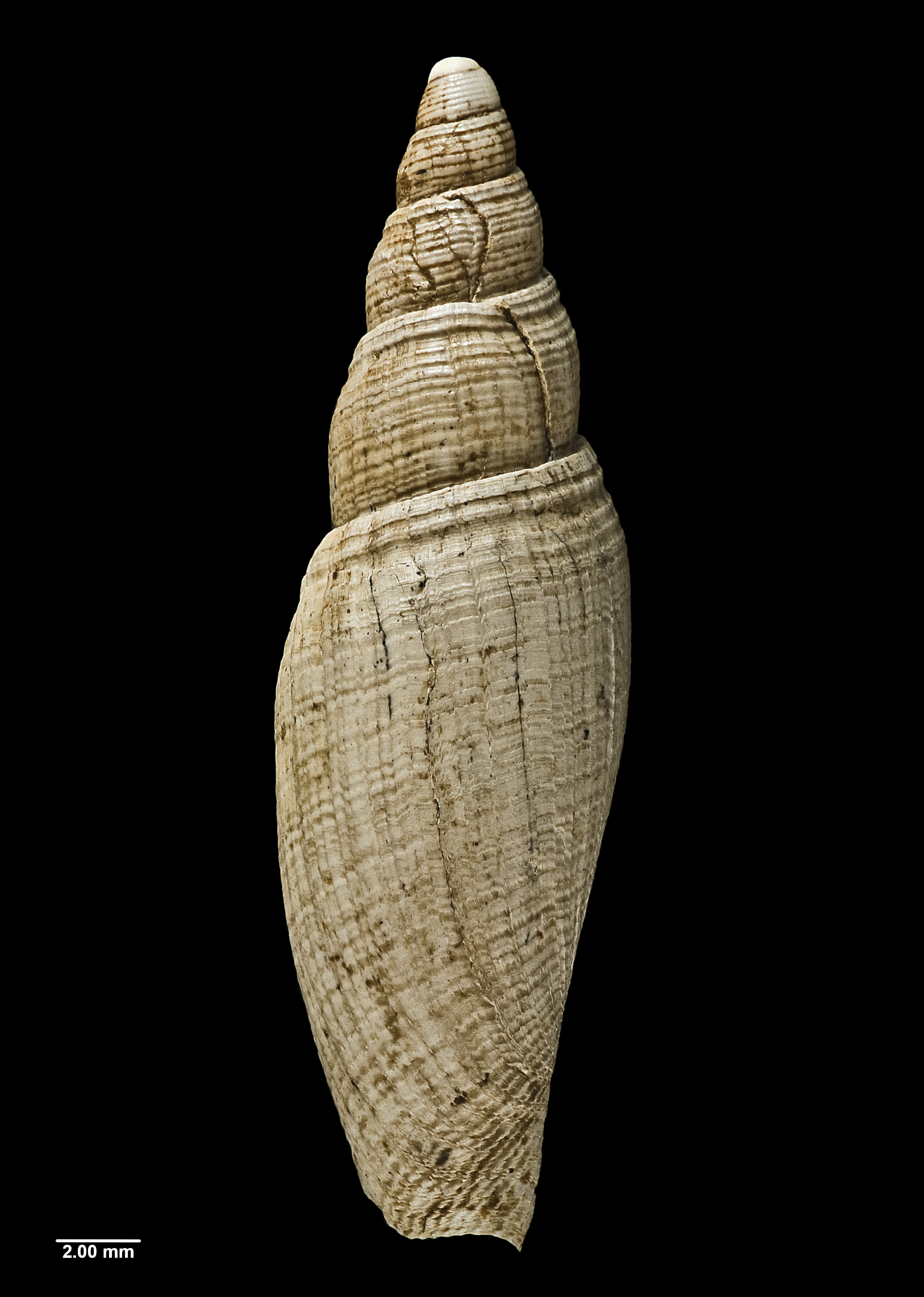
Reverse view of holotype

In the original description, Powell described the species as follows:

Shell very large for the genus, slender, subcylindrical. Aperture more than half height of shell. Post-nuclear sculpture of six flat-topped, linear-spaced cords on first whorl, doubled on next by bifurcation of all cords, and increased to 14 on penultimate; body-whorl with about 58 weak, irregularly developed, narrow cords. There is a slight shoulder sulcus below the second cord from the suture, being marked by a wider interspace, equal to the width of two cords. Axial sculpture obsolete.

The holotype of the species measures 29.3 mm (1.15 in) in height and 8.9 mm (0.35 in) in diameter.

== Taxonomy ==
The species was first described by A.W.B. Powell in 1944. Prior to being described as a distinct species, fossils of the species had been identified as members of Teleochilus gracillimus. The holotype was collected from Clifton Bank near Hamilton, Victoria at an unknown date prior to 1944, and is held by the Auckland War Memorial Museum.

== Distribution ==
This extinct marine species dates to the middle Miocene (Balcombian), and occurs in the strata of the Otway Basin of South Australia and Victoria, Australia, including the Muddy Creek Formation.
