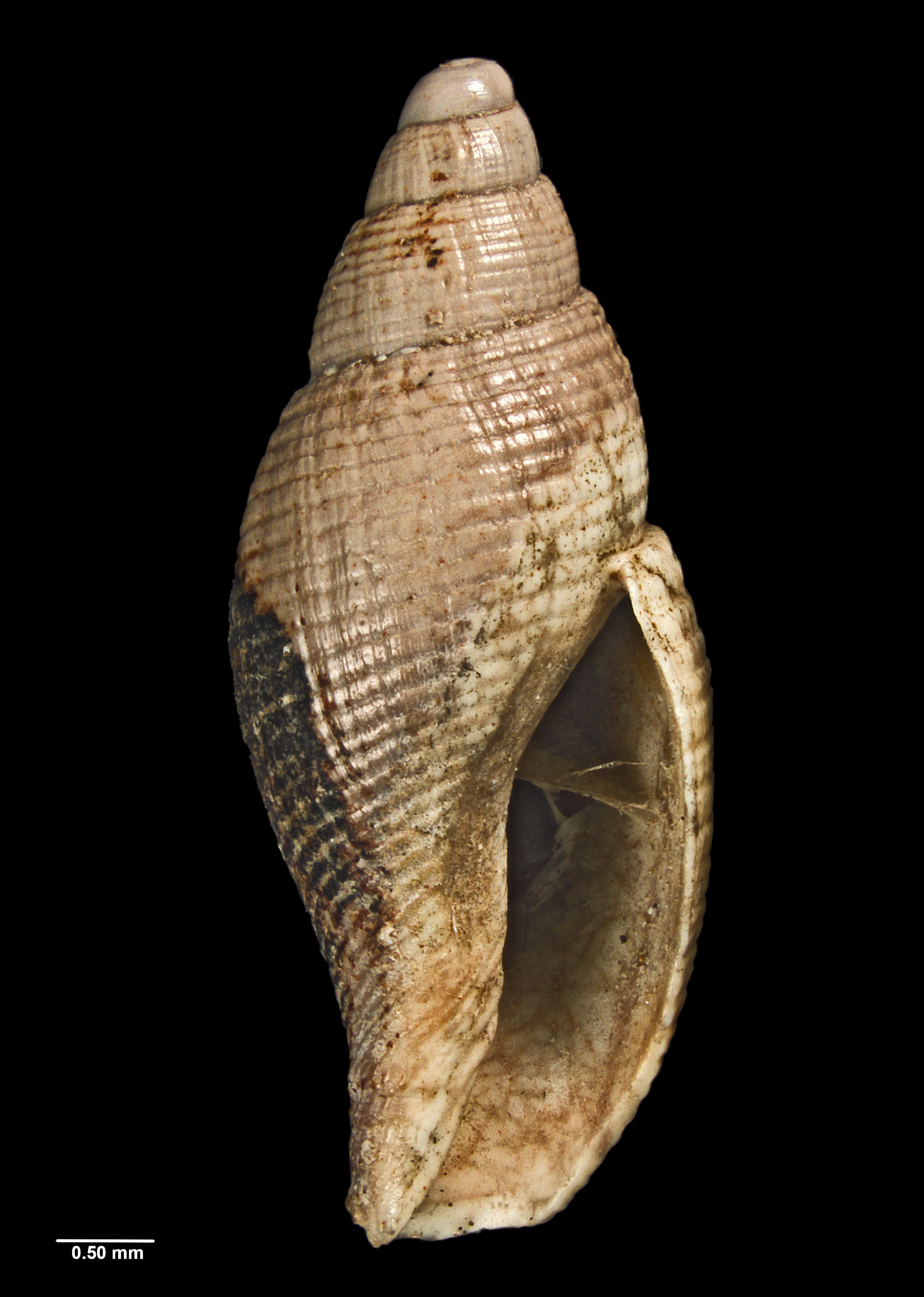
- Holotype from Auckland War Memorial Museum

Scientific classification
- Kingdom: Animalia
- Phylum: Mollusca
- Class: Gastropoda
- Subclass: Caenogastropoda
- Order: Neogastropoda
- Family: Raphitomidae
- Genus: Teleochilus
- Species: †T. comptus

Binomial name
- †Teleochilus comptus Powell, 1944

= Teleochilus comptus =

Teleochilus comptus Temporal range: late Oligocene–early Miocene

Extinct species of gastropod

Teleochilus comptus is an extinct species of sea snail, a marine gastropod mollusc in the family Raphitomidae. Fossils of the species date to the late Oligocene and early Miocene, and have been found in strata of the Port Phillip Basin of Victoria, Australia.

== Description ==
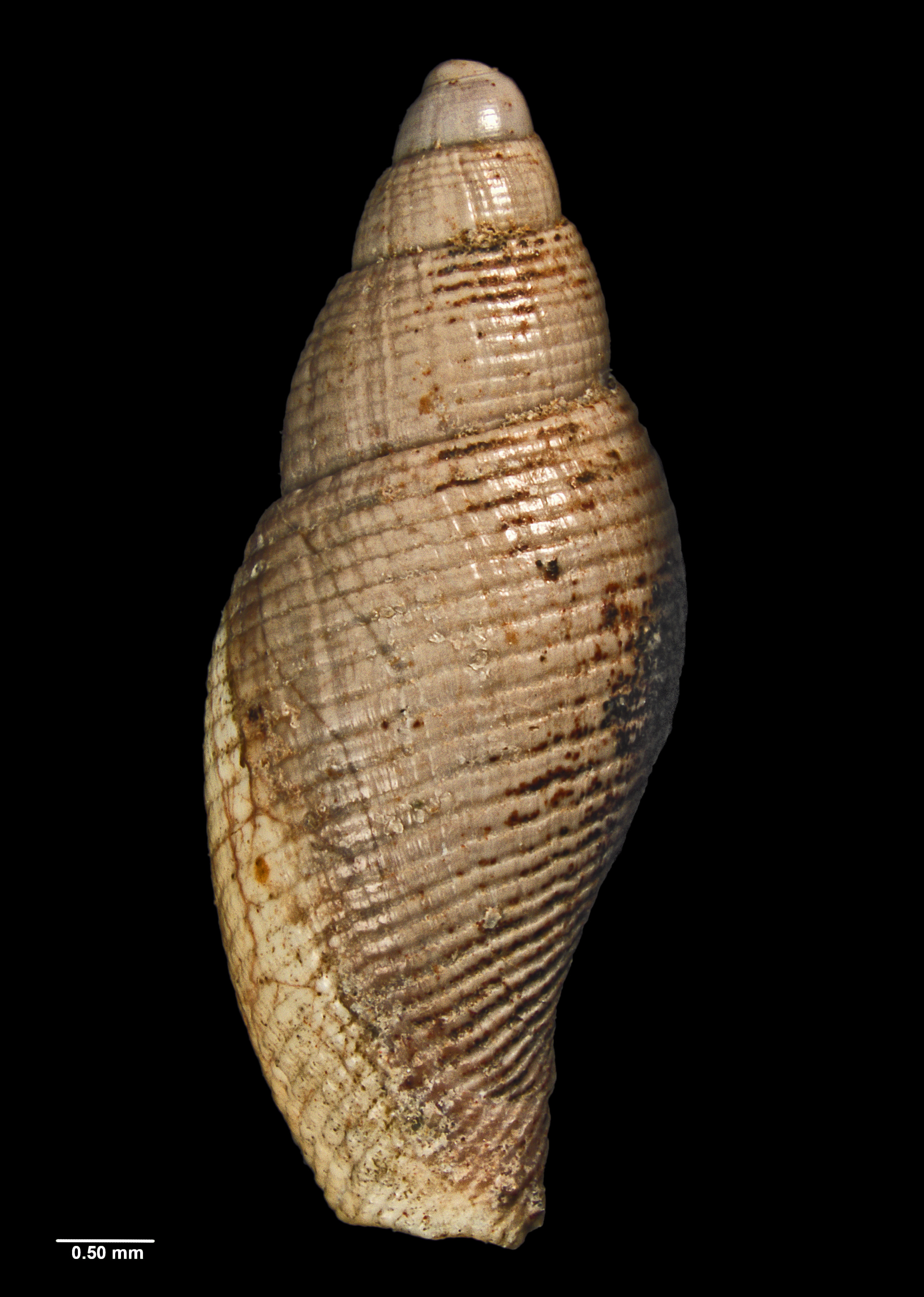
Reverse view of holotype

In the original description, Powell described the species as follows:

Shell small, ovate-biconic. Aperture almost two-thirds height of shell. Post-nuclear sculpture of 9-10 rather broad, flat-topped cords, with linear interspaces. Shoulder sulcus, a slightly wider interspace between cords 2 and 3 from the suture. About 34 cords on the body-whorl, 10 of which are on the neck. Protoconch almost smooth, showing 8-9 very faint spiral threads. Aperture much smaller than in other species. Lower inside portion of pillar with 7-8 oblique characteristic Daphnellid plications.

The holotype of the species measures 12.7 mm (0.50 in) in height and 5 mm (0.20 in) in diameter.

== Taxonomy ==
The species was first described by A.W.B. Powell in 1944. The holotype was collected in Torquay, Victoria at an unknown date prior to 1944, and is held by the Auckland War Memorial Museum.

== Distribution ==
This extinct marine species dates to the late Oligocene and early Miocene, and occurs in the strata of the Port Phillip Basin of Victoria, Australia, including the Jan Juc Formation and the Puebla Formation.
