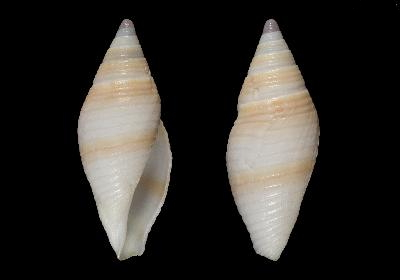
- Shell of Benthofascis conorbioides (holotype in the MNHN, Paris)

Scientific classification
- Kingdom: Animalia
- Phylum: Mollusca
- Class: Gastropoda
- Subclass: Caenogastropoda
- Order: Neogastropoda
- Superfamily: Conoidea
- Family: Conorbidae
- Genus: Benthofascis
- Species: B. conorbioides

Binomial name
- Benthofascis conorbioides Tucker, Tenorio & Stahlschmidt, 2011

= Benthofascis conorbioides =

Species of gastropod

Benthofascis conorbioides is a species of sea snail, a marine gastropod mollusc in the family Conorbidae.

These snails are predatory and venomous. They are capable of "stinging" humans, therefore live ones should be handled carefully or not at all.

== Description ==
The length of an adult shell varies between 38 and 43 mm, its diameter between 15 mm and 17 mm.

== Distribution ==
This marine species is endemic to Australia and occurs off Southern Queensland at depths between 80 m and 120 m.
