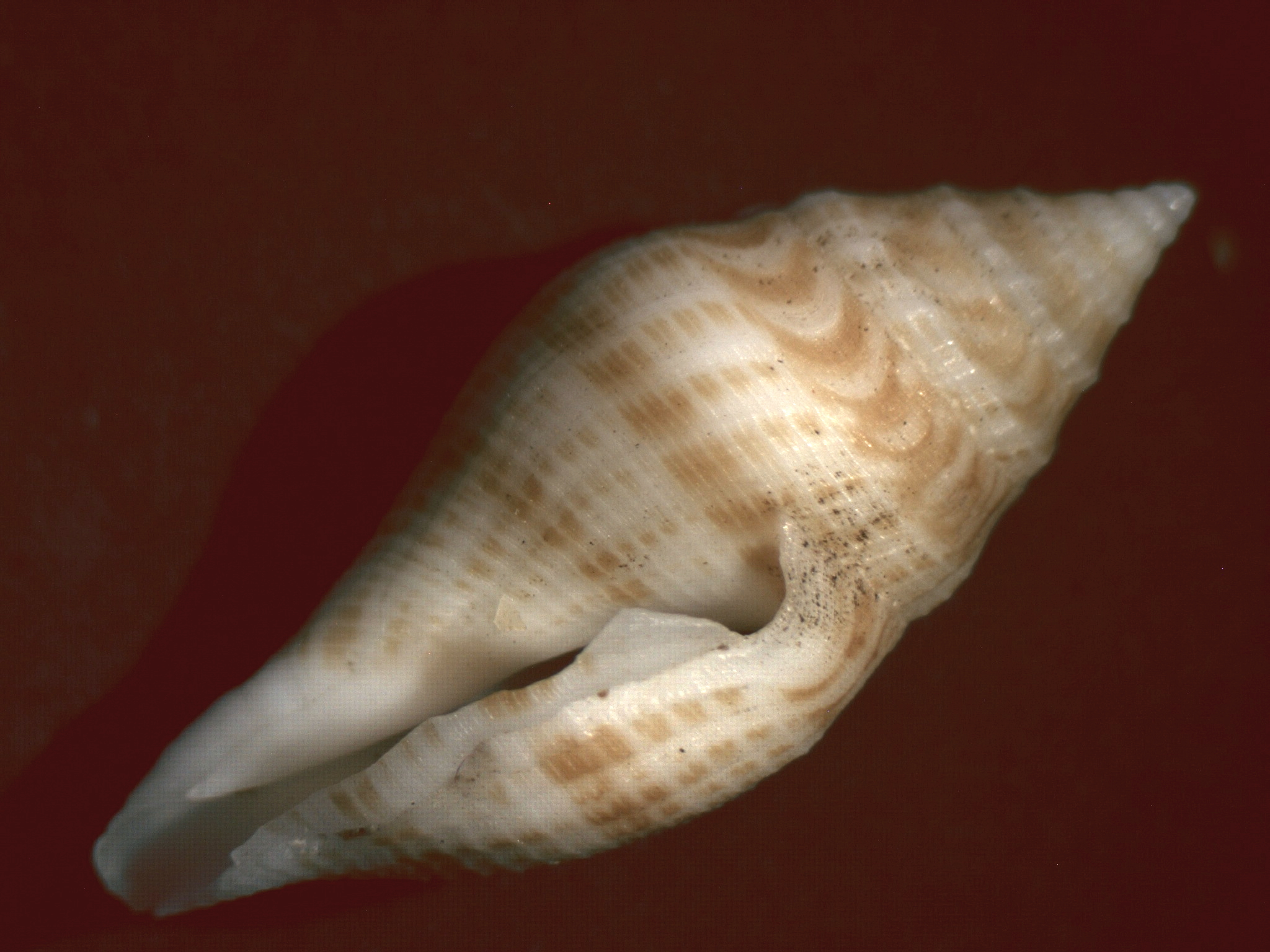
- Shell of Genotina adamii

Scientific classification
- Kingdom: Animalia
- Phylum: Mollusca
- Class: Gastropoda
- Subclass: Caenogastropoda
- Order: Neogastropoda
- Superfamily: Conoidea
- Family: Mangeliidae
- Genus: Genotina; Vera-Peláez, 2004

Type species
- Genotina genotae Vera-Peláez, 2004

Species
- See text

= Genotina =

Genus of gastropods

Genotina is a genus of sea snails, marine gastropod mollusks in the family Mangeliidae.

== Species ==
Species within the genus Genotina include:

- Genotina adamii (Bozzetti, 1994)
- Genotina genotae Vera-Peláez, 2004
