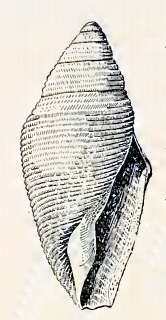
- Original drawing of a shell of Benthofascis biconica

Scientific classification
- Kingdom: Animalia
- Phylum: Mollusca
- Class: Gastropoda
- Subclass: Caenogastropoda
- Order: Neogastropoda
- Superfamily: Conoidea
- Family: Conorbidae
- Genus: Benthofascis
- Species: B. biconica

Binomial name
- Benthofascis biconica (Hedley, 1903)

Synonyms
- Bathytoma biconica Hedley, 1903 (original combination); Teleochilus biconicus Hedley, 1903

= Benthofascis biconica =

Species of gastropod

Benthofascis biconica is a species of sea snail, a marine gastropod mollusk in the family Conorbidae.

These snails are predatory and venomous. They are capable of "stinging" humans, therefore live ones should be handled carefully or not at all.

== Description ==
The length of an adult shell varies between 20 mm and 42 mm. The diameter of the holotype is 8 mm.

(Original description) The solid shell has a biconical shape. It is slightly angled at the shoulder. The shell contains more than six whorls (the shell is too worn in order to describe the protoconch). The colour of the shell is apparently flesh-tint. Below the shoulder the shell is furrowed by numerous fine spiral grooves, crossed by arcuate growth lines. Above the furrows are broader and fewer. The aperture is narrow. The sinus is sutural and deep. The outer lip (broken in my example) appears to have curved far forward. The columella is angled in the centre, spreading broadly and with a small anterior plication.

== Distribution ==
This marine species is endemic to Australia and occurs off New South Wales.
