= Hemiconus stromboides =

Scientific classification
- Kingdom: Animalia
- Phylum: Mollusca
- Class: Gastropoda
- Subclass: Caenogastropoda
- Order: Neogastropoda
- Superfamily: Conoidea
- Family: Conidae
- Genus: †Hemiconus
- Species: †H. stromboides

Binomial name
- †Hemiconus stromboides (Lamarck, 1802)

Synonyms
- † Conus stromboides Lamarck, 1802

Extinct species of gastropod

Hemiconus stromboides is an extinct species of sea snail, a marine gastropod mollusk, in the family Conidae, the cone snails and their allies.

== Distribution ==
Fossils of this marine species were found in France.
