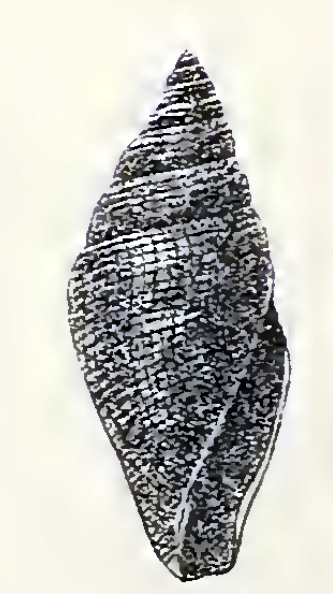
- Original drawing of a shell of Benthofascis atractoides

Scientific classification
- Kingdom: Animalia
- Phylum: Mollusca
- Class: Gastropoda
- Subclass: Caenogastropoda
- Order: Neogastropoda
- Superfamily: Conoidea
- Family: Conorbidae
- Genus: Benthofascis
- Species: B. atractoides

Binomial name
- Benthofascis atractoides (Tate, 1890)

Synonyms
- Conus (Conorbis) atractoides Tate, 1890

= Benthofascis atractoides =

Extinct species of gastropod

Benthofascis atractoides is an extinct species of sea snail, a marine gastropod mollusk in the family Conorbidae.

== Description ==
The length of an adult shell attains 16.5 mm, its diameter 6.5 mm. It is superficially similar to Benthofascis conorbioides, but it does not resorb the inner whorls.

(Original description) The biconic, moderately thick shell has an ovately fusiform shape. Its surface is spirally furrowed, smooth and shining. The spire is regularly conical and measures about one-third the total length of the shell. It consists of five whorls, ending in a small, blunt, turbinate protoconch of two and a-half smooth rounded whorls. The whorls of the teleoconch are slightly convex. They are separated by a well-defined linear suture and ornamented by six flat spiral ribs, the three posterior ones separated by flat shallow sulci of about equal width, the three anterior ones by linear grooves sometimes almost obsolete. The interstitial furrows are punctulatedly impressed. The body whorl is obtusely angled at the periphery, regularly attenuated anteriorly; ornamented with flat spiral ribs (about 30), separated by narrow furrows, crossed by sigmoidal lines of growth which produce the appearance of punctations in the interstitial furrows. The aperture is narrow, broadly emarginate in front and measures about half the length of the shell. The outer lip is thin and sharp on the edge, smooth within, much curved medially.

== Distribution ==
This extinct marine species is endemic to Lower Miocene of Australia.
