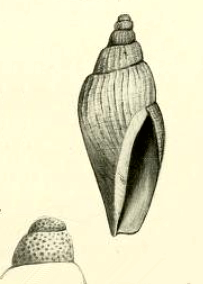
- Original image of a shell and the protoconch of Teleochilus royanus

Scientific classification
- Kingdom: Animalia
- Phylum: Mollusca
- Class: Gastropoda
- Subclass: Caenogastropoda
- Order: Neogastropoda
- Superfamily: Conoidea
- Family: Raphitomidae
- Genus: Teleochilus
- Species: T. royanus

Binomial name
- Teleochilus royanus Iredale, 1924

= Teleochilus royanus =

Species of gastropod

Teleochilus royanus is a species of sea snail, a marine gastropod mollusk in the family Raphitomidae.

== Description ==
The length of the shell attains 16 mm, its diameter 6.5 mm.

The apical whorls are minutely punctate and the succeeding whorls are obsoletely longitudinally ribbed and transversely scratched, a couple of transverse ridges being more prominent below the suture, which is slightly canaliculate. The aperture is longer than the spire.

This is the most interesting species found by Roy Bell, and, until the animal is examined, its classification must remain obscure. As noted above, the only specimens I have seen were dead, but this may be the same thing as recorded by Gatliff and Gabriel from Bass Straits as Baphnohela sp., in which case live specimens may soon turn up.

The genus Teleochilus was subordinated by Maurice Cossmann, who was followed by Tate, to Daphnobela, a genus proposed for a Bartonian Eocene fossil, which seems to have no relationship.

== Distribution ==
This marine species is endemic to Australia and occurs off New South Wales and Victoria.
