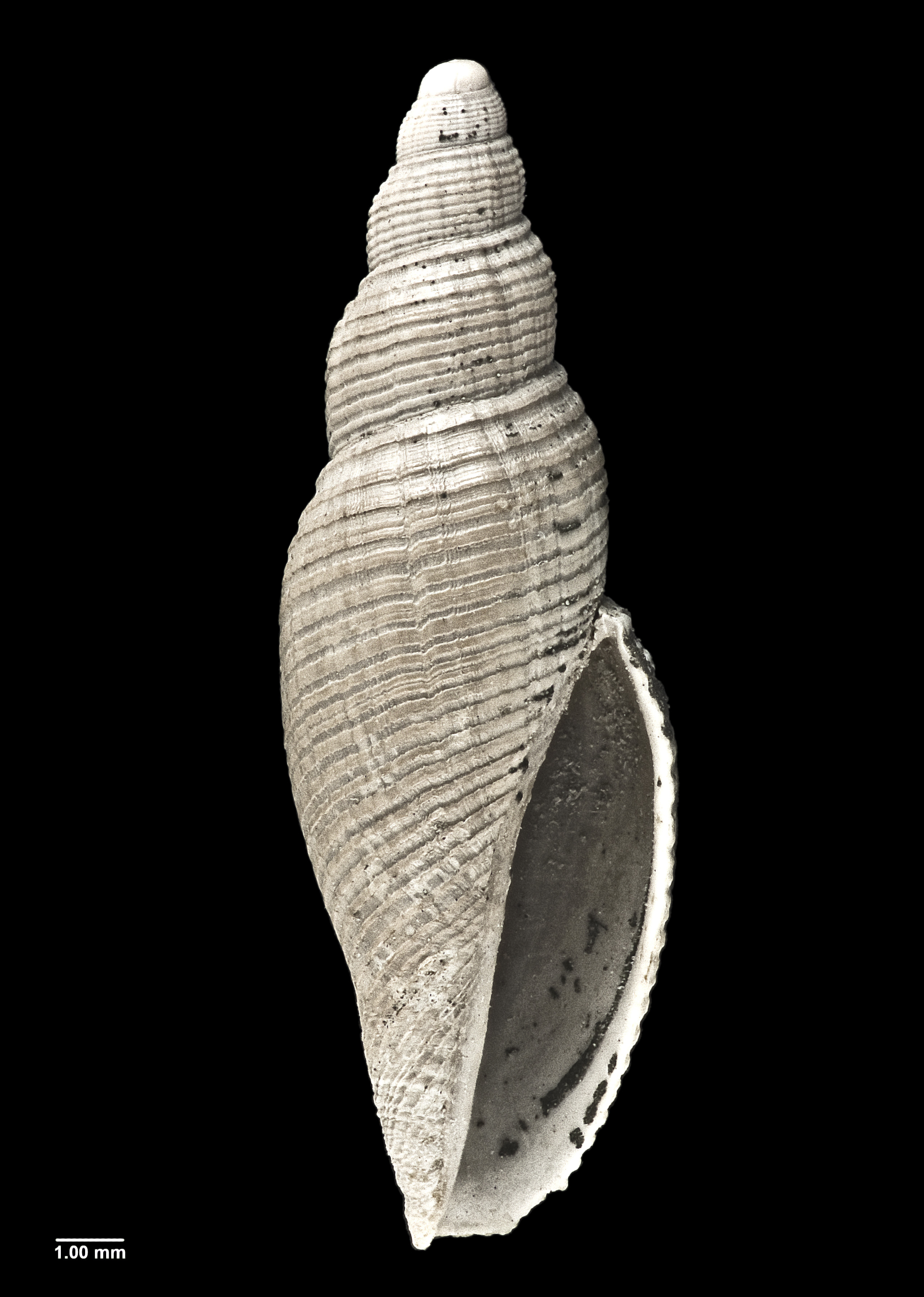
- Holotype from Auckland War Memorial Museum

Scientific classification
- Kingdom: Animalia
- Phylum: Mollusca
- Class: Gastropoda
- Subclass: Caenogastropoda
- Order: Neogastropoda
- Family: Raphitomidae
- Genus: Teleochilus
- Species: †T. balcombensis

Binomial name
- †Teleochilus balcombensis Powell, 1944

= Teleochilus balcombensis =

Teleochilus balcombensis Temporal range: Middle Miocene

Extinct species of gastropod

Teleochilus balcombensis is an extinct species of sea snail, a marine gastropod mollusc in the family Raphitomidae. Fossils of the species date to the middle Miocene, and have been found in strata of the Port Phillip Basin of Victoria, Australia.

== Description ==
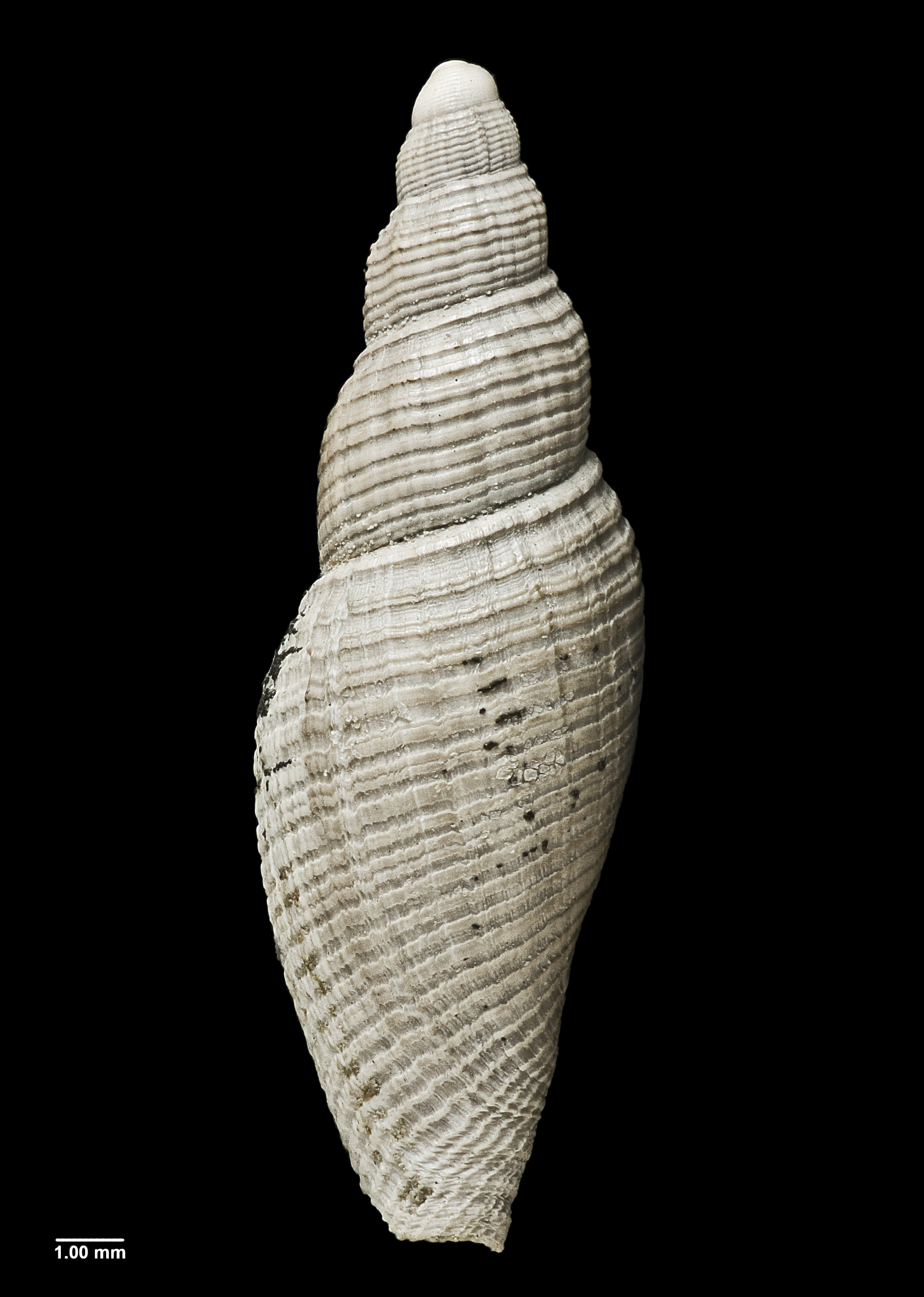
Reverse view of holotype

In the original description, Powell described the species as follows:

Shell of moderate size, slender, subcylindrical, but with the spire-whorls noticeably convex. Aperture about half height of shell. Post-nuclear sculpture of 8-9 flat-topped, moderately strong cords, with inter-spaces averaging half their width. Two to four cords on the median area of the body-whorl are bifurcated by a linear groove. There are 26 primary cords on the body-whorl. Shoulder sulcus distinct, situated below the first subsutural cord. Axial sculpture of weak, wide-spaced folds on first 2-3 whorls.

The holotype of the species measures 18 mm (0.71 in) in height and 6 mm (0.24 in) in diameter.

== Taxonomy ==
The species was first described by A.W.B. Powell in 1944. The holotype was collected from Fossil Beach of Balcombe Bay, Mornington, Victoria at an unknown date prior to 1944, and is held by the Auckland War Memorial Museum.

== Distribution ==
This extinct marine species dates to the middle Miocene (Balcombian), and occurs in the strata of the Port Phillip Basin of Victoria, Australia, including the Gellibrand Formation.
