= Hemiconus tremletti =

Scientific classification
- Domain: Eukaryota
- Kingdom: Animalia
- Phylum: Mollusca
- Class: Gastropoda
- Subclass: Caenogastropoda
- Order: Neogastropoda
- Superfamily: Conoidea
- Family: Conidae
- Genus: †Hemiconus
- Species: †H. tremletti

Binomial name
- †Hemiconus tremletti Le Renard, 1994

Synonyms
- † Conus nodulosus Deshayes, 1865 (invalid: junior homonym of Conus nodulosus G. B. Sowerby II, 1864)

Extinct species of gastropod

Hemiconus tremletti is an extinct species of sea snail, a marine gastropod mollusk, in the family Conidae, the cone snails and their allies.

== Distribution ==
Fossils of this marine species were found in France.
