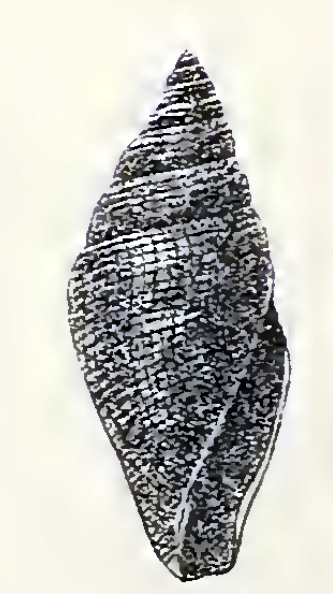
- Drawing of a shell of Benthofascis atractoides.

Scientific classification
- Kingdom: Animalia
- Phylum: Mollusca
- Class: Gastropoda
- Subclass: Caenogastropoda
- Order: Neogastropoda
- Family: Conorbidae
- Genus: Benthofascis; Iredale, 1936

Type species
- Bathytoma biconica Hedley, 1903

= Benthofascis =

Genus of gastropods

Benthofascis is a genus of sea snails, marine gastropod mollusks in the family Conorbidae.

Like other species in the superfamily Conoidea these snails are predatory and venomous, able to inject neurotoxins into their prey with their radula.

This genus was previously included in the family Turridae (subfamily Conorbinae) and later in the family Conidae. In 2009 Tucker & Tenorio included it in the family Conorbidae.

== Species ==
The known living species within the genus Benthofascis are:

- Benthofascis angularis Tucker, Tenorio & Stahlschmidt, 2011
- † Benthofascis atractoides (Tate, 1890)
- Benthofascis biconica (Hedley, 1903)
- Benthofascis conorbioides Tucker, Tenorio & Stahlschmidt, 2011
- Benthofascis lozoueti Sysoev & Bouchet, 2001
- † Benthofascis otwayensis Long, 1981 – from Oligocene of Victoria, Australia
- Benthofascis pseudobiconica Tucker, Tenorio & Stahlschmidt, 2011
- Benthofascis sarcinula (Hedley, 1905)
