= Genotina genotae =

Scientific classification
- Kingdom: Animalia
- Phylum: Mollusca
- Class: Gastropoda
- Subclass: Caenogastropoda
- Order: Neogastropoda
- Superfamily: Conoidea
- Family: Mangeliidae
- Genus: Genotina
- Species: G. genotae

Binomial name
- Genotina genotae Vera-Peláez, 2004

Species of gastropod

Genotina genotae is a species of sea snail, a marine gastropod mollusk in the family Mangeliidae.

== Description ==
The shell of the adult snail grows to a length of 22 mm.

== Distribution ==
Genotina genotae is a demersal sea snail living off the Philippines.
