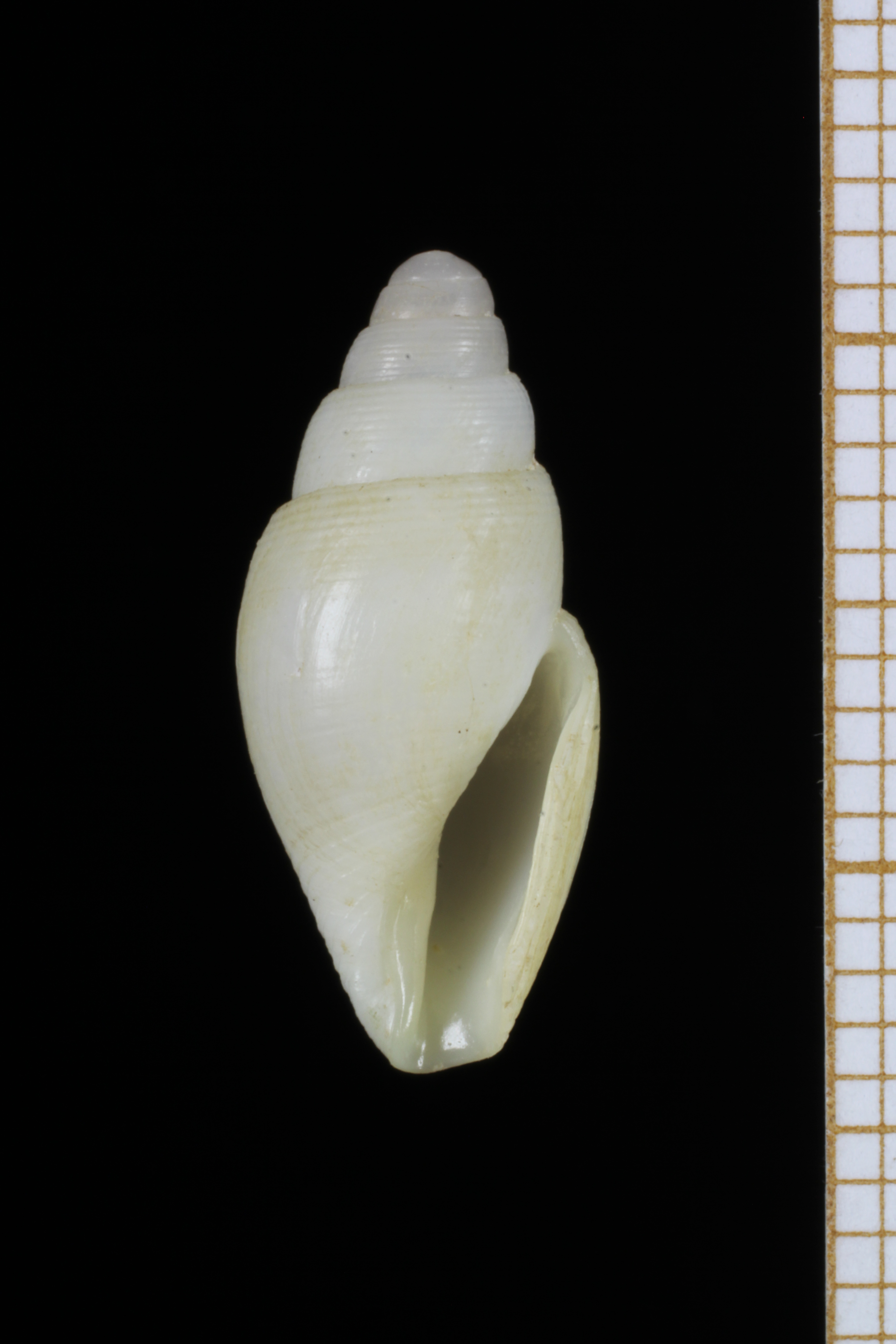
- Shell of Benthofascis lozoueti (specimen at MNHN, Paris)

Scientific classification
- Kingdom: Animalia
- Phylum: Mollusca
- Class: Gastropoda
- Subclass: Caenogastropoda
- Order: Neogastropoda
- Superfamily: Conoidea
- Family: Conorbidae
- Genus: Benthofascis
- Species: B. lozoueti

Binomial name
- Benthofascis lozoueti Sysoev & Bouchet, 2001

= Benthofascis lozoueti =

Species of gastropod

Benthofascis lozoueti is a species of sea snail, a marine gastropod mollusk in the family Conorbidae.

These snails are predatory and venomous. They are capable of "stinging" humans, therefore live ones should be handled carefully or not at all.

== Description ==
The length of an adult shell attains 21.5 mm, its diameter 9.1 mm.

== Distribution ==
This marine species is endemic to the Norfolk Ridge and found at a depth of 530 m; also off New Caledonia.
