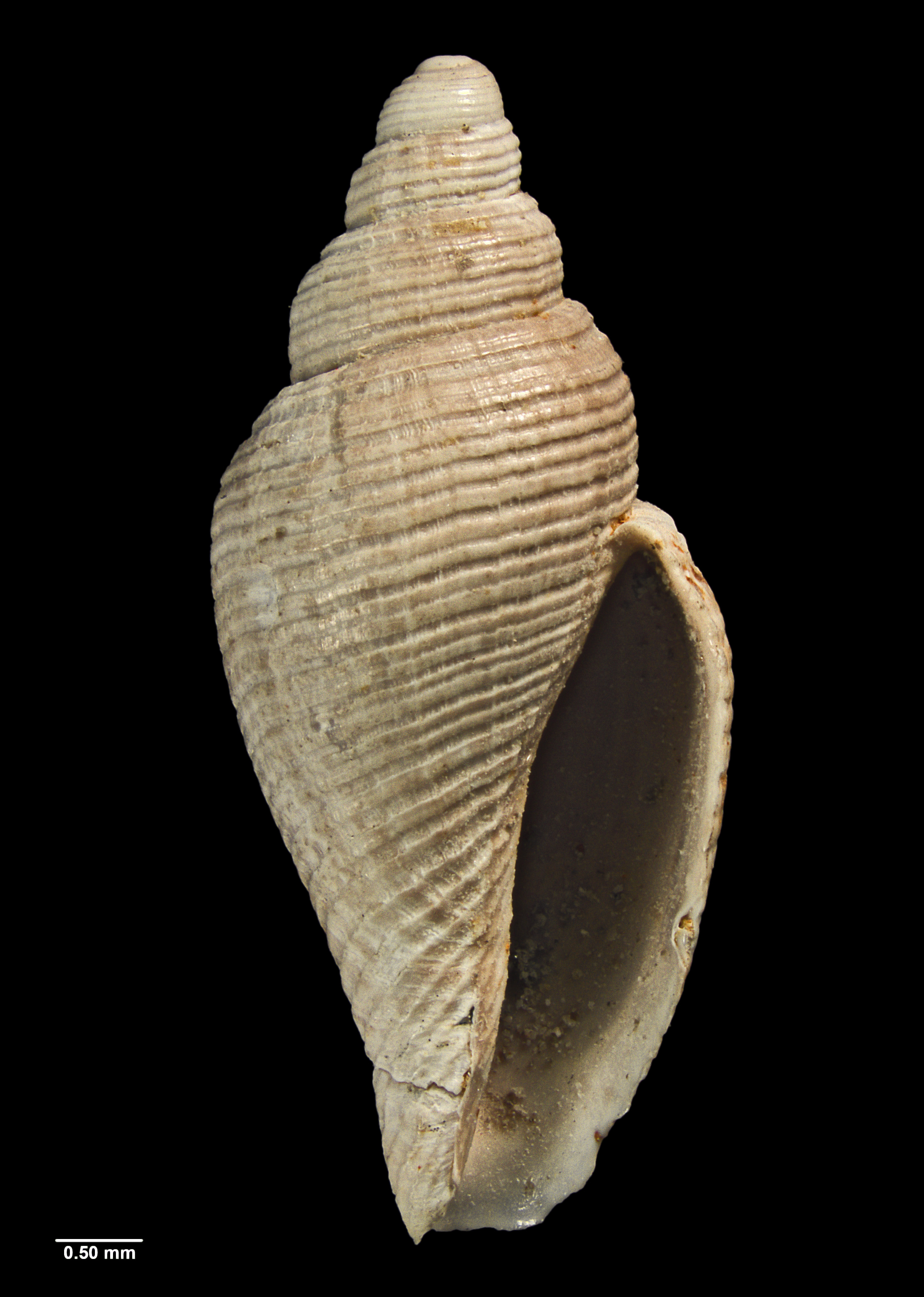
- Holotype from Auckland War Memorial Museum

Scientific classification
- Kingdom: Animalia
- Phylum: Mollusca
- Class: Gastropoda
- Subclass: Caenogastropoda
- Order: Neogastropoda
- Family: Raphitomidae
- Genus: Teleochilus
- Species: †T. duplicatus

Binomial name
- †Teleochilus duplicatus Powell, 1944

= Teleochilus duplicatus =

Teleochilus duplicatus Temporal range: middle Miocene

Extinct species of gastropod

Teleochilus duplicatus is an extinct species of sea snail, a marine gastropod mollusc in the family Raphitomidae. Fossils of the species date to the middle Miocene, and have been found in strata of the Port Phillip Basin of Victoria, Australia.

== Description ==
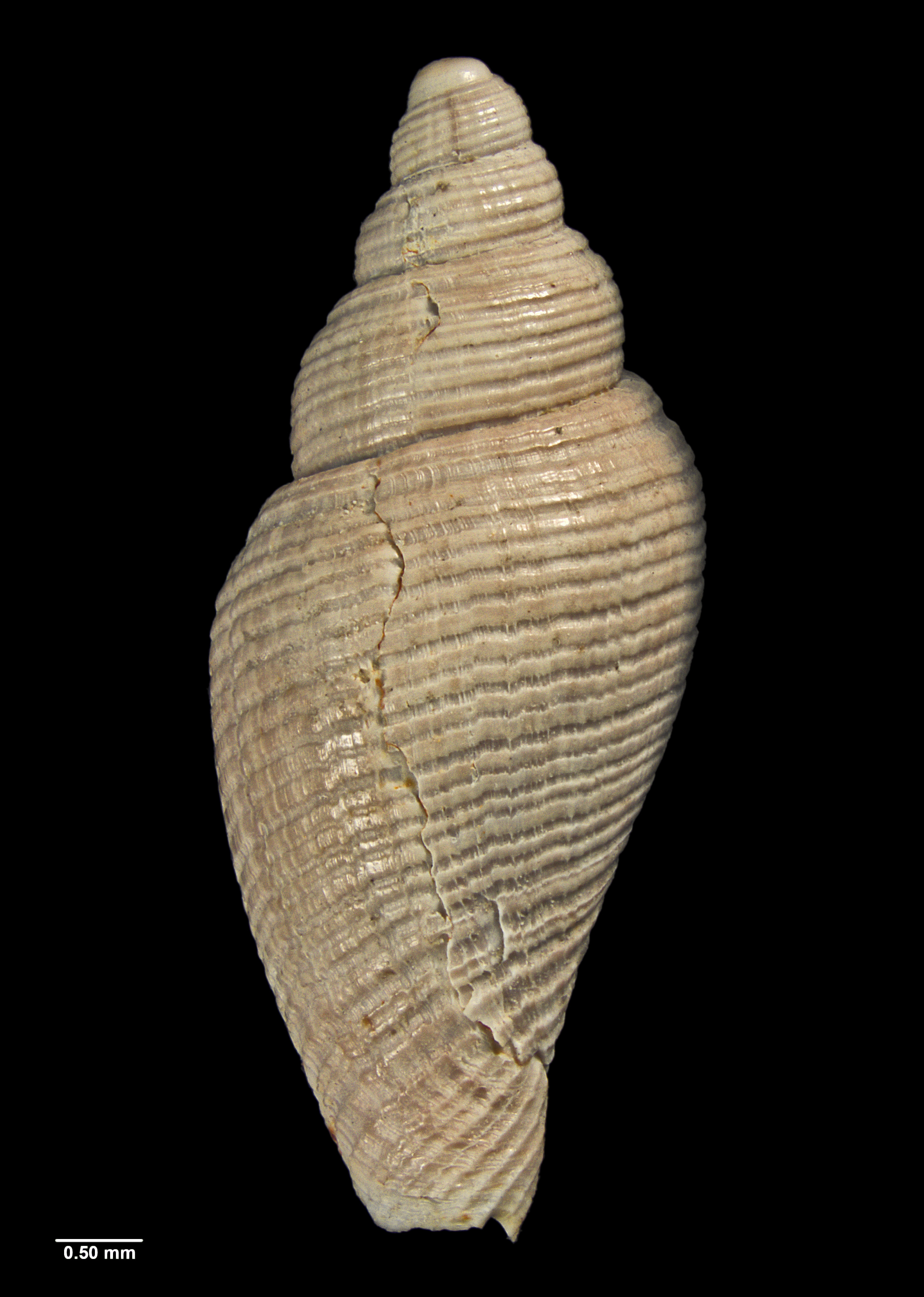
Reverse view of holotype

In the original description, Powell described the species as follows:

Shell of moderate size, ovate-biconic. Aperture almost two-thirds height of shell. Whorls strongly convex, greatest convexity just above the middle. Protoconch sculptured with six strong, rounded spiral cords. Post-nuclear whorls with five pairs of strong, flat-topped spiral cords, one pair submargining suture and separated from the remaining four by a moderately deep, narrow sulcus. On the body-whorl there are eleven pairs of cords and nine single cords on the anterior end. Each pair of cords is linear-spaced, but the interspaces between the pairs are half the width of a cord or more, There is no axial sculpture.

The holotype of the species measures 14.1 mm (0.56 in) in height and 5.1 mm (0.20 in) in diameter.

== Taxonomy ==
The species was first described by A.W.B. Powell in 1944. The holotype was collected from Grice's Creek (also known as Gunyoung Creek) near Mornington, Victoria at an unknown date prior to 1944, and is held by the Auckland War Memorial Museum.

== Distribution ==
This extinct marine species dates to the middle Miocene, and occurs in the strata of the Port Phillip Basin of Victoria, Australia, including the Gellibrand Formation.
