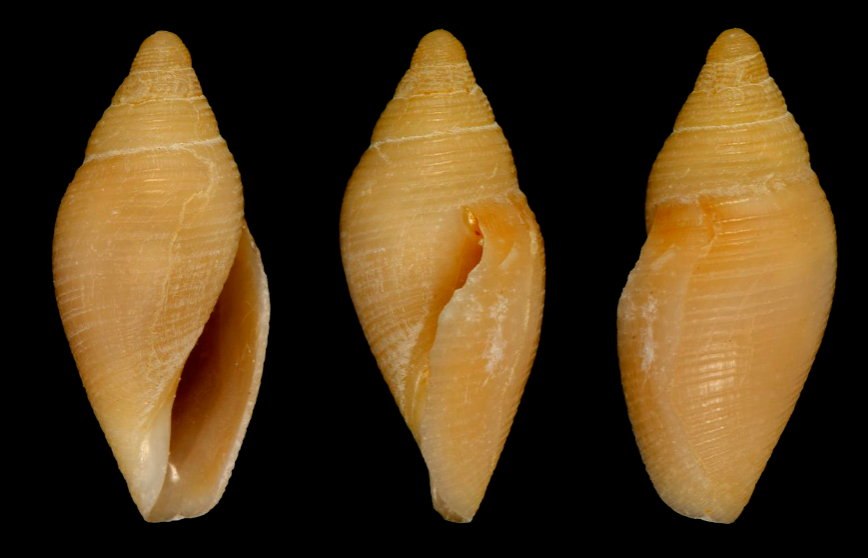
- Shell of Benthofascis sarcinula (specimen at the Smithsonian Institution)

Scientific classification
- Kingdom: Animalia
- Phylum: Mollusca
- Class: Gastropoda
- Subclass: Caenogastropoda
- Order: Neogastropoda
- Superfamily: Conoidea
- Family: Conorbidae
- Genus: Benthofascis
- Species: B. sarcinula

Binomial name
- Benthofascis sarcinula (Hedley, 1905)

Synonyms
- Apaturris sarcinulus (Hedley, 1905); Bathytoma sarcinula Hedley, 1905 (original combination); Teleochilus sarcinulum (Hedley, 1905)

= Benthofascis sarcinula =

Species of gastropod

Benthofascis sarcinula is a species of sea snail, a marine gastropod mollusk in the family Conorbidae.

These snails are predatory and venomous. They are capable of "stinging" humans, therefore live ones should be handled carefully or not at all.

== Description ==
The length of an adult shell varies between 16.6 mm and 24.7 mm. The diameter varies between 7.4 mm and 10.7 mm.

(Original description) The solid shell is small and has an ovate-fusiform shape. Its colour is pale yellow, with a rusty tinge at the suture. The shell contains 3½ whorls, including a protoconch of 1½ whorl. The protoconch shows fine spiral grooves, continued on the adult as broad, shallow furrows, which are broadest at the suture becoming smaller and closer anteriorly. On the body whorl are twenty-two spiral ribs, on the penultimate whorl six. The latter are latticed by fine radial riblets. The whole shell is crossed by fine, arcuate growth lines. The aperture is narrow. The sinus is deep. The outer lip is thin, straight, produced medially, edge crenulated by the sculpture. No callus on the inner lip. The columella is broad and twisted. The siphonal canal is not produced.

== Distribution ==
This marine species is endemic to Australia and occurs off New South Wales, Queensland and Tasmania.
