= Hemiconus peraratus =

Scientific classification
- Kingdom: Animalia
- Phylum: Mollusca
- Class: Gastropoda
- Subclass: Caenogastropoda
- Order: Neogastropoda
- Superfamily: Conoidea
- Family: Conidae
- Genus: †Hemiconus
- Species: †H. peraratus

Binomial name
- †Hemiconus peraratus Cossmann, 1897

Extinct species of gastropod

Hemiconus peraratus is an extinct species of sea snail, a marine gastropod mollusk, in the family Conidae, the cone snails and their allies.

The variety Hemiconus peraratus var. gouetensis Cossmann, 1897 † accepted as Hemiconus gouetensis Cossmann, 1897 † (original rank)

== Distribution ==
Fossils of this marine species were found in France.
