= Hemiconus =

Scientific classification
- Kingdom: Animalia
- Phylum: Mollusca
- Class: Gastropoda
- Subclass: Caenogastropoda
- Order: Neogastropoda
- Superfamily: Conoidea
- Family: Conidae
- Genus: †Hemiconus; Cossmann, 1889

Synonyms
- Conus (Hemiconus) Cossmann, 1889

Extinct genus of gastropods

Hemiconus is an extinct genus of sea snails, marine gastropod mollusks, in the family Conidae the cone snails and their allies.

== Species ==
Species within the genus Hemiconus include:

- † Hemiconus acionna Pacaud in Coan, Pacaud & Kabat, 2024
- † Hemiconus angulifer Cossmann & Pissarro, 1901
- † Hemiconus auriculatus Tracey & Craig, 2017
- † Hemiconus constantinensis Tracey & Craig, 2017
- † Hemiconus cryptoconoides Cossmann & Pissarro, 1901
- † Hemiconus disjunctus (Deshayes, 1865)
- † Hemiconus douvillei Cossmann & Pissarro, 1901
- † Hemiconus gouetensis Cossmann, 1897
- † Hemiconus granatinus (Deshayes, 1865)
- † Hemiconus granularis (Borson, 1820)
- † Hemiconus lateralis Tracey & Craig, 2017
- † Hemiconus leroyi Tracey & Craig, 2017
- † Hemiconus peraratus Cossmann, 1897
- † Hemiconus pissarroi Tracey & Craig, 2017
- † Hemiconus scabriculus (Solander, 1766)
- † Hemiconus stromboides (Lamarck, 1802)
- † Hemiconus tremletti Le Renard, 1994
- † Hemiconus trisulcatus Tracey & Craig, 2017
- † Hemiconus tromelini (Vasseur, 1882)
- † Hemiconus turbinopsis (Deshayes, 1865)
