= Hemiconus scabriculus =

Scientific classification
- Domain: Eukaryota
- Kingdom: Animalia
- Phylum: Mollusca
- Class: Gastropoda
- Subclass: Caenogastropoda
- Order: Neogastropoda
- Superfamily: Conoidea
- Family: Conidae
- Genus: †Hemiconus
- Species: †H. scabriculus

Binomial name
- †Hemiconus scabriculus (Solander, 1766)

Synonyms
- † Conus corculum J. de C. Sowerby, 1841; † Conus lineatus Solander, 1766; † Conus scabriculus Solander, 1766

Extinct species of gastropod

Hemiconus scabriculus is an extinct species of sea snail, a marine gastropod mollusk, in the family Conidae, the cone snails and their allies.

== Distribution ==
Fossils of this marine species were found in Eocene strata in United Kingdom.
