= Hemiconus tromelini =

Scientific classification
- Domain: Eukaryota
- Kingdom: Animalia
- Phylum: Mollusca
- Class: Gastropoda
- Subclass: Caenogastropoda
- Order: Neogastropoda
- Superfamily: Conoidea
- Family: Conidae
- Genus: †Hemiconus
- Species: †H. tromelini

Binomial name
- †Hemiconus tromelini (Vasseur, 1882)

Synonyms
- † Conus tromelini Vasseur, 1882; † Hemiconus lennieri Cossmann & Pissarro, 1901

Extinct species of gastropod

Hemiconus tromelini is an extinct species of sea snail, a marine gastropod mollusk, in the family Conidae, the cone snails and their allies.

== Distribution ==
Fossils of this marine species were found in France.
