= Hemiconus gouetensis =

Scientific classification
- Kingdom: Animalia
- Phylum: Mollusca
- Class: Gastropoda
- Subclass: Caenogastropoda
- Order: Neogastropoda
- Superfamily: Conoidea
- Family: Conidae
- Genus: †Hemiconus
- Species: †H. gouetensis

Binomial name
- †Hemiconus gouetensis Cossmann, 1897

Synonyms
- Hemiconus peraratus var. gouetensis Cossmann, 1897

Extinct species of gastropod

Hemiconus gouetensis is an extinct species of sea snail, a marine gastropod mollusk, in the family Conidae, the cone snails and their allies.

== Distribution ==
Fossils of this marine species were found in France.
