= Hemiconus granularis =

Scientific classification
- Domain: Eukaryota
- Kingdom: Animalia
- Phylum: Mollusca
- Class: Gastropoda
- Subclass: Caenogastropoda
- Order: Neogastropoda
- Superfamily: Conoidea
- Family: Conidae
- Genus: †Hemiconus
- Species: †H. granularis

Binomial name
- †Hemiconus granularis (Borson, 1820)

Synonyms
- † Artemidiconus granularis (Borson, 1820); † Conus (Hemiconus) granularis Borson, 1820; † Conus (Hemiconus) granularis var. lissitzensis Sacco, 1893; † Conus (Stephanoconus) stachei Hoernes & Auinger, 1879; † Conus granularis Borson, 1820; † Conus granulatocinctus Mayer-Eymar, 1892; † Conus granuliferus Grateloup, 1835; † Conus granuliferus var. drnowitzensis de Gregorio, 1885; † Conus granuliferus var. opellus de Gregorio, 1885; † Conus stachei Hoernes & Auinger, 1879

Extinct species of gastropod

Hemiconus granularis is an extinct species of sea snail, a marine gastropod mollusk, in the family Conidae, the cone snails and their allies.
