= Teleochilus gracillimus =

Scientific classification
- Kingdom: Animalia
- Phylum: Mollusca
- Class: Gastropoda
- Subclass: Caenogastropoda
- Order: Neogastropoda
- Superfamily: Conoidea
- Family: Raphitomidae
- Genus: Teleochilus
- Species: †T. gracillimus

Binomial name
- †Teleochilus gracillimus (Tenison Woods, 1876)

Synonyms
- † Daphnella gracillima Tenison Woods, 1876

Extinct species of gastropod

Teleochilus gracillimus is an extinct species of sea snail, a marine gastropod mollusk in the family Raphitomidae.

== Description ==
The length of the shell attains 25 mm, its diameter 10 mm.

(Original description) The fusiform shell is thin, fragile and shining. It contains six whorls, gracefully sloping. The body whorl is longer than the spire. The whorls are finely striate lengthwise with irregular ridges of growth which become fine, close, and rounded at the lip. They are regularly and somewhat distantly grooved with rather broad, flat, shallow, conspicuously striate grooves, one of which is much broader just below the suture, which is distinctly canaliculate. The protoconch is obtuse and smooth, but granulations could have been present as the slightest wear removes them. The aperture is narrow, finely rounded at the suture. The outer lip is thin. The siphonal canal is short. The base of the columella is finely and obliquely decussate behind.

== Distribution ==
Fossils of this marine species were found off Table Cape, Tasmania, Australia and in Eocene strata at Muddy Creek, Victoria.
