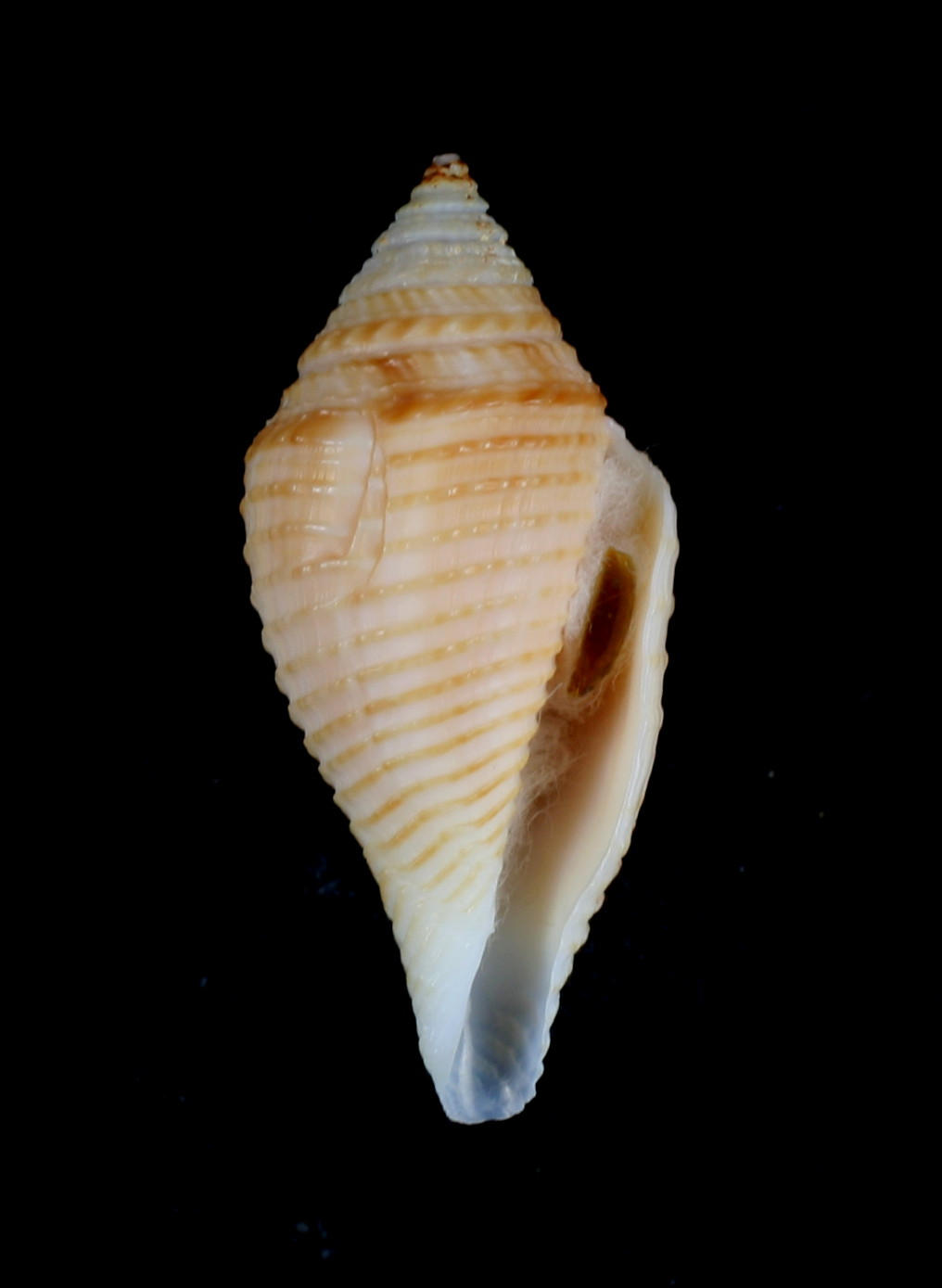
- Apertural view of shell of Conasprella coromandelica (E.A. Smith, 1894), measuring 35.4 mm in height, dredged at 250 ft. off Madras, in India.

Scientific classification
- Kingdom: Animalia
- Phylum: Mollusca
- Class: Gastropoda
- Subclass: Caenogastropoda
- Order: Neogastropoda
- Superfamily: Conoidea
- Family: Conidae
- Genus: Conasprella
- Species: C. coromandelica

Binomial name
- Conasprella coromandelica (E. A. Smith, 1894)

Synonyms
- Conasprella (Pseudoconorbis) coromandelica (E. A. Smith, 1894) · accepted, alternate representation; Conorbis coromandelicus (E. A. Smith, 1894); Conus coromandelicus E. A. Smith, 1894 (original combination); Pseudoconorbis coromandelicus (E. A. Smith, 1894)

= Conasprella coromandelica =

Species of gastropod

Conasprella coromandelicus is a species of sea snail, a marine gastropod mollusk in the family Conidae, the cone snails and their allies. This species was first described by E. A. Smith in 1894. This species was originally described as Conus coromandelicus E. A. Smith, 1894.

== Description ==
The shell of Conasprella coromandelica is relatively small, with adult shells varying in size between 29 mm and 45 mm.

== Distribution ==
Conasprella coromandelicus is a demersal sea snail, found in the Indian Ocean: East Africa, Bay of Bengal, Sri Lanka and Gulf of Oman. It is found in waters ranging from 70–400 meters in depth. This species inhabits demersal zones, typically at depths ranging from 70 to 400 meters.
