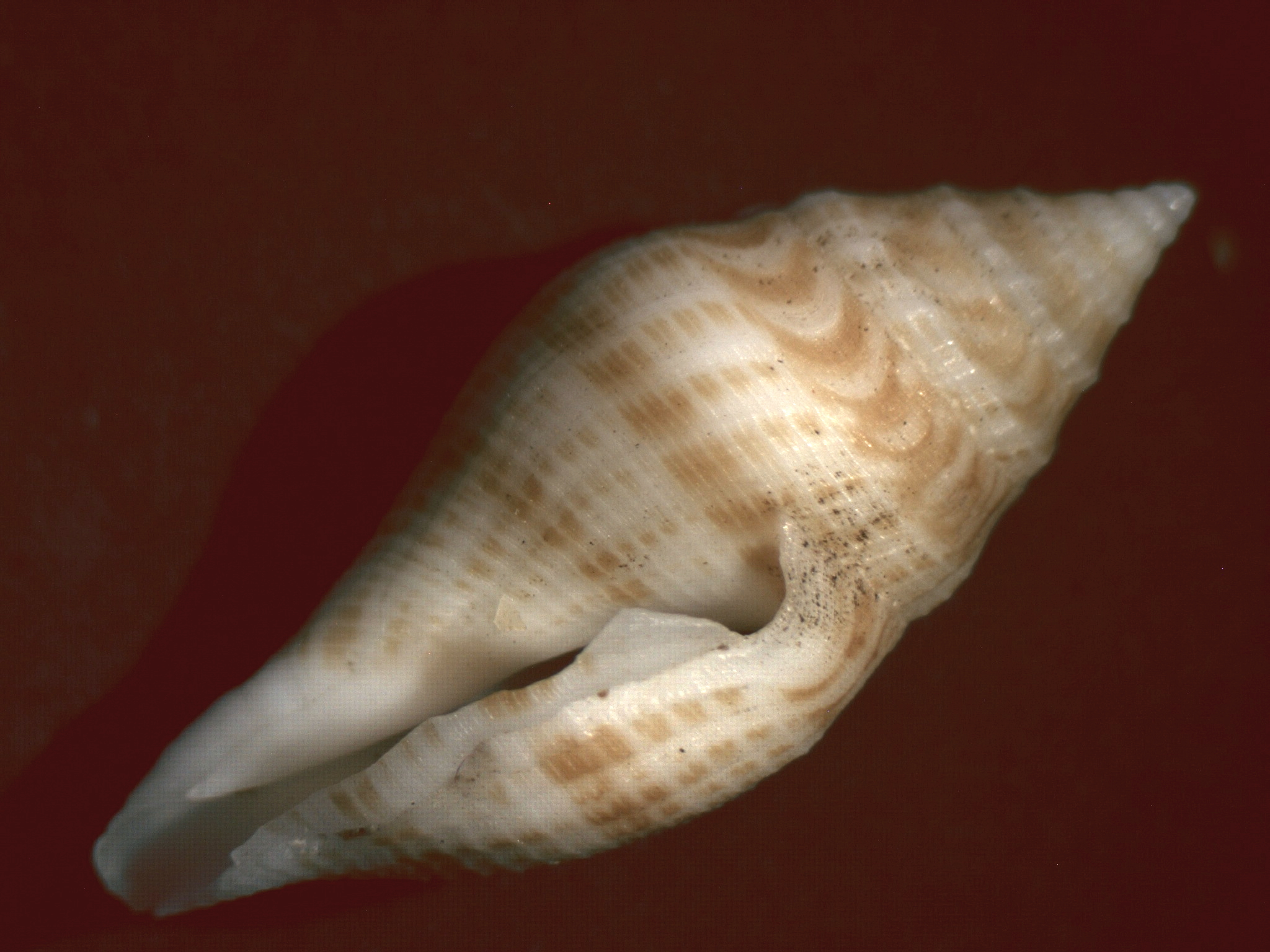
- Apertural view of a shell of Genotina adamii

Scientific classification
- Kingdom: Animalia
- Phylum: Mollusca
- Class: Gastropoda
- Subclass: Caenogastropoda
- Order: Neogastropoda
- Superfamily: Conoidea
- Family: Mangeliidae
- Genus: Genotina
- Species: G. adamii

Binomial name
- Genotina adamii (L. Bozzetti, 1994)

Synonyms
- Conorbis adamii Bozzetti, 1994; Pseudoconorbis adamii L. Bozzetti, 1994

= Genotina adamii =

Species of gastropod

Genotina adamii is a species of sea snail, a marine gastropod mollusk in the family Mangeliidae.

== Description ==
The shell of the adult snail grows to a length of 18 mm.

== Distribution ==
Genotina adamii is a demersal sea snail living in tropical Indo-Pacific waters off the Philippines.
