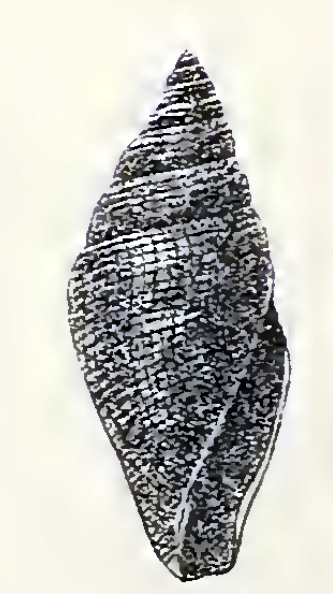
- Drawing of a shell of Benthofascis atractoides

Scientific classification
- Kingdom: Animalia
- Phylum: Mollusca
- Class: Gastropoda
- Subclass: Caenogastropoda
- Order: Neogastropoda
- Superfamily: Conoidea
- Family: Conorbidae de Gregorio, 1880

Type genus
- Conorbis Swainson, 184

Genera
- See text

= Conorbidae =

Family of gastropods

Conorbidae is a monophyletic family of small to medium-sized sea snails, marine gastropod molluscs in the superfamily Conoidea. Despite the name of the family, which might seem to suggest otherwise, this group of gastropods are not cone snails, but are instead what used to be loosely called "turrids".

== Taxonomy ==
In 2009, John K. Tucker and Manuel J. Tenorio elevated the subfamily Conorbiinae (at that point it was placed in the family Conidae) to the rank of family. This was based on a cladistical analysis of anatomical characters including the radular tooth, morphology (i.e. shell characters), as well as an analysis of prior molecular phylogeny studies, all of which was used to construct phylogenetic trees. Tucker and Tenorio noted a close relationship to genera such as Bathytoma in their phylogeny, which corresponded to prior molecular studies by Puillandre et al.. Shortly thereafter, in 2011, Bouchet, Kantor et al. confirmed the elevation of the subfamily Conorbiinae to the rank of family based upon a detailed molecular phylogeny of a dataset of molecular sequences of three gene (DNA) fragments conducted across the superfamily Conoidea. Tucker and Tenorio’s proposed classification system for the cone shells and their allies (and the other clades of Conoidean gastropods ) is shown in Tucker & Tenorio cone snail taxonomy 2009.

Like other species in the superfamily Conoidea, these snails are predatory and venomous, able to inject neurotoxins into their prey with their radula.

== Description ==
The shell can have different forms: from squatly conical to elongated or even biconical. There are no nodules on the shell, but cords may be present. The interior of the shell, including the columellar region, is substantially remodeled (meaning that the external sculpture is reabsorbed when the body whorl grows over it). Two of the three genera in this family have an asymmetrical anal notch. The spire in the fossil genus Conorbis is much elevated. Its outer lip is sinuous, forming an oblique posterior sinus.

The living species of this family possess several primitive radular characteristics; they do not have the folds which are present in all other closely related families. The radula usually has an anterior fold, without a waist, base, C-fold, terminating cusps, serrations or accessory process. The basal spur is either parallel with the tooth base or directed towards the apex of the tooth.

== Genera ==
Genera within the family Conorbidae include:

- Artemidiconus da Motta, 1991 (consisting of one living species, with no fossil record)
- Benthofascis Iredale, 1936 (consisting of six living species, with no fossil record)
- † Conorbis Swainson, 1840 (fossil genus from the Eocene and Oligocene consisting of 14 recognized fossil species)
