= Cerithiopsilla =

Scientific classification
- Kingdom: Animalia
- Phylum: Mollusca
- Class: Gastropoda
- Subclass: Caenogastropoda
- Order: incertae sedis
- Family: Cerithiopsidae
- Genus: Cerithiopsilla; Thiele, 1912

Genus of gastropods

Cerithiopsilla is a genus of very small sea snails, marine gastropod molluscs in the family Cerithiopsidae. It was described by Thiele in 1912.

== Species ==
- Cerithiopsilla antarctica (Smith, 1907)
- Cerithiopsilla austrina (Hedley, 1911)
- Cerithiopsilla bisculpta (Strebel, 1908)
- Cerithiopsilla burdwoodiana (Melvill & Standen, 1912)
- Cerithiopsilla charcoti (Lamy, 1906)
- Cerithiopsilla cincta Thiele, 1912
- Cerithiopsilla gaussiana Egorova, 1972
- Cerithiopsilla georgiana (Pfeffer, 1886)
- Cerithiopsilla liouvillei (Lamy, 1910)
