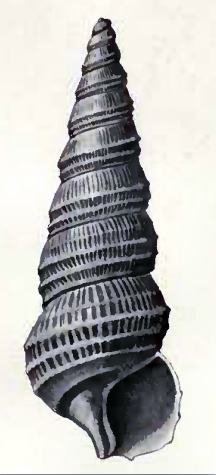
- Apertural view of a shell of Cerithiella austrina

Scientific classification
- Kingdom: Animalia
- Phylum: Mollusca
- Class: Gastropoda
- Subclass: Caenogastropoda
- Order: incertae sedis
- Family: Newtoniellidae
- Genus: Cerithiella; Verrill, 1882

Type species
- Cerithium metula Lovén, 1846

Synonyms
- Binda Laseron, 1951; Cerithiella (Cerithiella) Verrill, 1882; Cerithiolinum Locard, 1903; Chasteria Iredale, 1915; Euseila Cotton, 1951; Lovenella G. O. Sars, 1878 (non Hincks, 1869); Newtonia Cossman, 1892 (non Schlegel 1867); Newtoniella Cossman, 1893; Stilus Jeffreys, 1885

= Cerithiella =

Genus of gastropods

Cerithiella is a genus of minute sea snails, marine gastropod molluscs in the family Newtoniellidae.

This genus was described by Verrill in 1882.

== Species ==
Species in the genus Cerithiella include:

- Cerithiella aethiopica Thiele, 1925
- Cerithiella amblytera (Watson, 1880)
- Cerithiella antarctica (E. A. Smith, 1907)
- Cerithiella argentata Thiele, 1925
- Cerithiella astrolabiensis (Strebel, 1908)
- Cerithiella atali M. Fernandes, Garofalo & Pimenta, 2015
- Cerithiella australis Cecalupo & Perugia, 2017
- Cerithiella austrina (Hedley, 1911)
- Cerithiella axicostulata Castellanos, Rolán & Bartolotta, 1987
- Cerithiella bisculpta (Strebel, 1908)
- Cerithiella burdwoodiana (Melvill & Standen, 1912)
- Cerithiella cacuminata (Hedley & Petterd, 1906) (taxon inquirendum)
- Cerithiella candela M. Fernandes, Garofalo & Pimenta, 2015
- Cerithiella cepene de Lima & de Barros, 2007
- Cerithiella danielsseni (Friele, 1877)
- Cerithiella elata Thiele, 1925
- Cerithiella enodis (Watson, 1880)
- Cerithiella eulimella Powell, 1958
- Cerithiella fallax Cecalupo & Perugia, 2017
- Cerithiella francescoi Cecalupo & Perugia, 2014
- † Cerithiella infelix (Marwick, 1931)
- Cerithiella insignis (Jeffreys, 1885)
- Cerithiella kaitotsuzukii Cecalupo & Perugia, 2019
- Cerithiella laevis (Thiele, 1912)
- † Cerithiella limula Darragh, 2017
- Cerithiella macroura (Melvill & Standen, 1912)
- † Cerithiella malakae Schnetler & M. S. Nielsen, 2018
- Cerithiella martensii (Dall, 1889)
- Cerithiella metula (Lovén, 1846)
- Cerithiella natalensis Barnard, 1963
- Cerithiella nucleoproducta (Dell, 1956)
- † Cerithiella paroaensis P. A. Maxwell, 1988
- Cerithiella pernambucoensis de Lima & de Barros, 2007
- Cerithiella pileata (Cotton, 1951)
- Cerithiella praerupta Cecalupo & Perugia, 2017
- Cerithiella producta Dall, 1927
- Cerithiella reunionensis (Jay & Drivas, 2002)
- † Cerithiella salmae Schnetler & M. S. Nielsen, 2018
- Cerithiella seymouriana (Strebel, 1908)
- Cerithiella sigsbeana (Dall, 1881)
- Cerithiella stiria (Webster, 1906)
- Cerithiella subuliapex Barnard, 1963
- Cerithiella superba Thiele, 1912
- Cerithiella taylori Barnard, 1963
- Cerithiella terebriformis Thiele, 1925
- Cerithiella terebroides Kuroda & Habe, 1971
- Cerithiella terebroides Kuroda & Habe, 1971
- † Cerithiella thomsoni P. A. Maxwell, 1992
- Cerithiella translucens Cecalupo & Perugia, 2017
- Cerithiella travani Cecalupo & Perugia, 2017
- † Cerithiella tricincta P. Marshall, 1919
- Cerithiella trisulcata (Yokoyama, 1922)
- Cerithiella vidalensis Barnard, 1963
- Cerithiella werthi Thiele, 1912

Species brought into synonymy

- Cerithiella aliceae Dautzenberg & H. Fischer, 1896: synonym of Eumetula aliceae (Dautzenberg & Fischer H., 1896)
- Cerithiella bouvieri Dautzenberg & H. Fischer, 1896: synonym of Eumetula bouvieri (Dautzenberg & Fischer H., 1896)
- Cerithiella cincta (Thiele, 1912): synonym of Cerithiella antarctica (E. A. Smith, 1907)
- Cerithiella cossmanni Dautzenberg & H. Fischer, 1896: synonym of Krachia cossmanni (Dautzenberg & Fischer H., 1896)
- Cerithiella erecta Thiele, 1912: synonym of Cerithiella seymouriana (Strebel, 1908)
- Cerithiella guernei Dautzenberg & H. Fischer, 1896: synonym of Krachia guernei (Dautzenberg & Fischer H., 1896)
- Cerithiella lineata Egorova, 1982: synonym of Cerithiella laevis (Thiele, 1912)
- Cerithiella macrocephala Dautzenberg & H. Fischer, 1897: synonym of Cerithiella metula (Lovén, 1846)
- Cerithiella similis Thiele, 1912: synonym of Cerithiella astrolabiensis (Strebel, 1908)
- Cerithiella whiteavesi (Verrill, 1880): synonym of Cerithiella metula (Lovén, 1846)
- Cerithiella (Cerithiella) tydemani Schepman, 1909: synonym of Pseudovertagus nobilis (Reeve, 1855)
