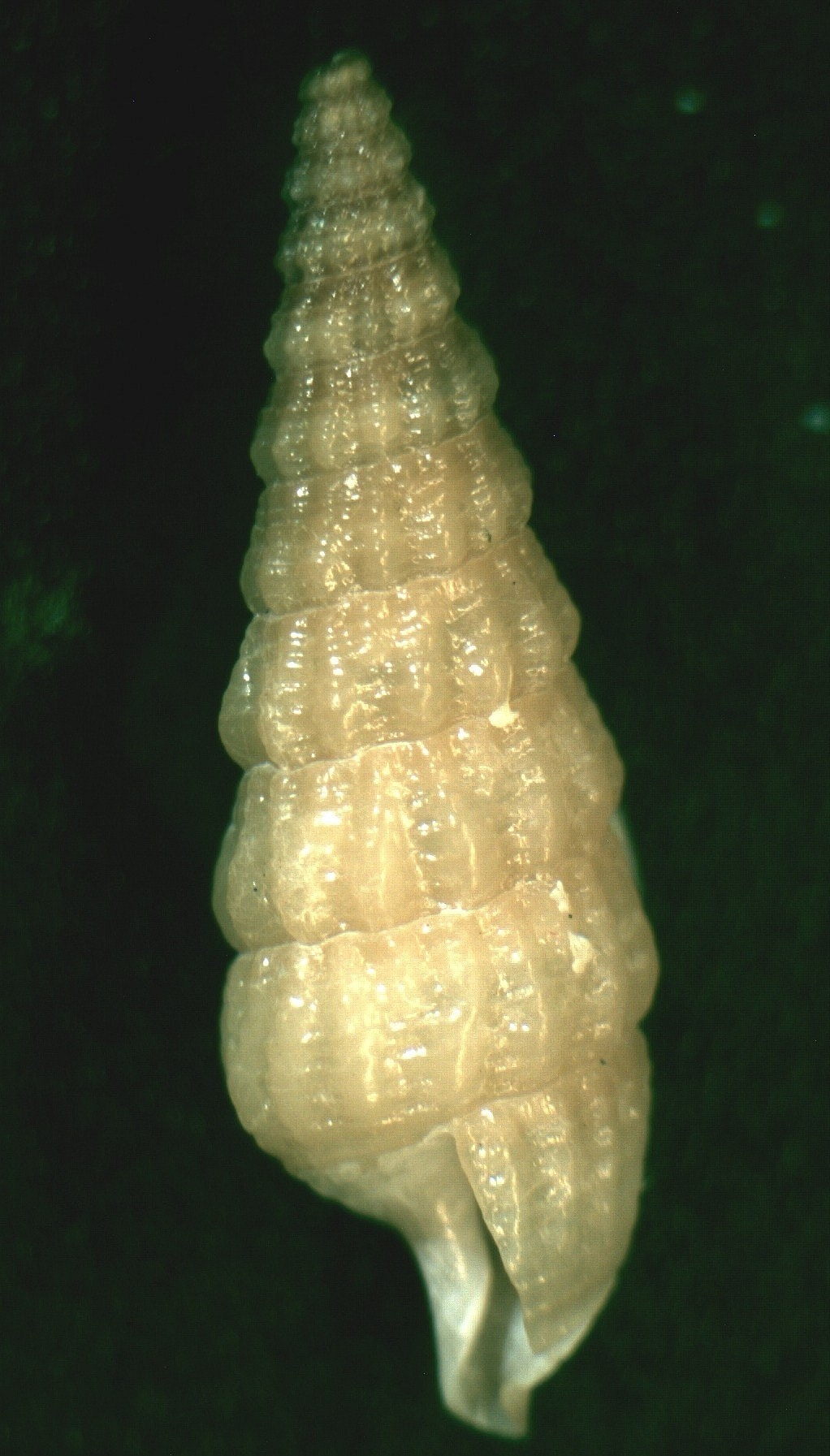
- Ataxocerithium serotinum shell

Scientific classification
- Kingdom: Animalia
- Phylum: Mollusca
- Class: Gastropoda
- Subclass: Caenogastropoda
- Order: incertae sedis
- Family: Newtoniellidae
- Genus: Ataxocerithium; Tate, 1893

Type species
- Cerithium serotinum A. Adams, 1855

Synonyms
- Geminataxum Iredale, 1936

= Ataxocerithium =

Genus of gastropods

Ataxocerithium is a genus of sea snails, marine gastropod molluscs in the family Newtoniellidae.

== Species ==
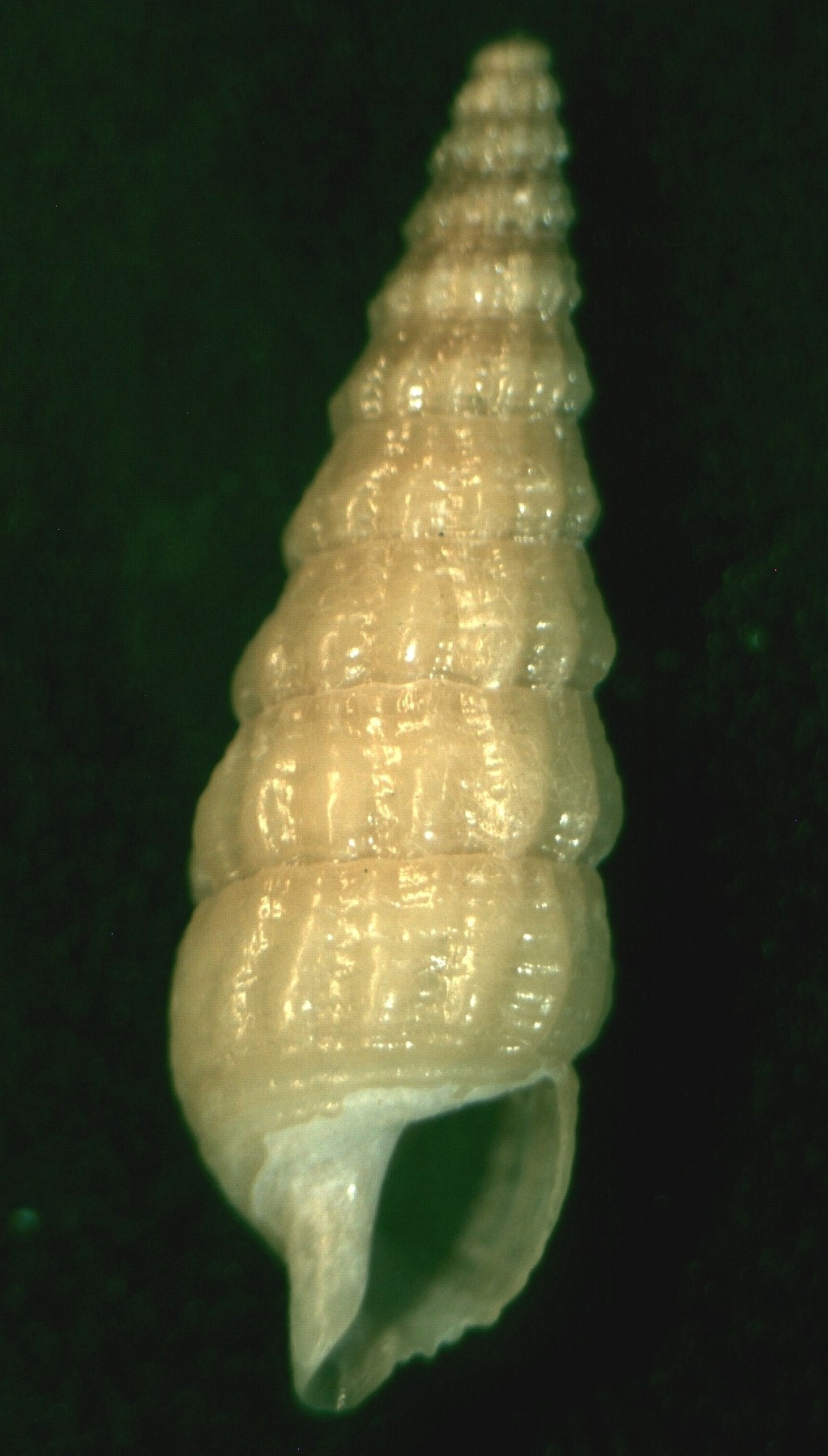
Ataxocerithium serotinum, apertural view

Species in the genus Ataxocerithium include:

- Ataxocerithium abnormale (Sowerby III, 1903)
- Ataxocerithium applenum Iredale, 1936
- Ataxocerithium beasleyi Cotton & Godfrey, 1938
- †Ataxocerithium biaulax Darragh, 2017
- Ataxocerithium brazieri Cossmann, 1906
- † Ataxocerithium cingulatum (Grönwall & Harder, 1907)
- † Ataxocerithium concatenatum Tate, 1894
- Ataxocerithium eximium Houbrick, 1987
- Ataxocerithium gemmulatum (Woolacott, 1957)
- Ataxocerithium huttoni Cossmann, 1895
- † Ataxocerithium ireki Harzhauser and Landau, 2026
- † Ataxocerithium kaawaense Laws, 1936
- Ataxocerithium kanakorum Cecalupo & Perugia, 2017
- † Ataxocerithium multicostulatum Darragh, 2017
- † Ataxocerithium otopleuroides Darragh, 2017
- † Ataxocerithium pyramidale Finlay, 1924
- † Ataxocerithium palotasae Harzhauser and Landau, 2026
- †Ataxocerithium robustum Finlay, 1924
- † Ataxocerithium scitulum Maxwell, 1992
- Ataxocerithium serotinum (Adams, 1855)
- † Ataxocerithium simplex Marwick, 1928
- † Ataxocerithium singulare Maxwell, 1992
- † Ataxocerithium tricingulatum Marwick, 1924
- † Ataxocerithium venustulum Darragh, 2017

Species brought into synonymy

- Ataxocerithium abbreviatum (Brazier, 1877): synonym of Ataxocerithium brazieri Cossmann, 1906
- Ataxocerithium conturbatum Iredale, 1936: synonym of Ataxocerithium serotinum (A. Adams, 1855)
- Ataxocerithium fucatum (Pease, 1861): synonym of Cerithium interstriatum G. B. Sowerby II, 1855
- † Ataxocerithium perplexum Marshall & Murdoch, 1919: synonym of Zeacumantus lutulentus (Kiener, 1842)
- Ataxocerithium perplexus P. Marshall & R. Murdoch, 1919: synonym of Zeacumantus lutulentus (Kiener, 1842)
- Ataxocerithium pullum (Philippi, 1845): synonym of Eumetula pulla (Philippi, 1845)
- Ataxocerithium scruposum Iredale, 1936: synonym of Ataxocerithium serotinum (A. Adams, 1855)
