= Eumetula macquariensis =

Scientific classification
- Kingdom: Animalia
- Phylum: Mollusca
- Class: Gastropoda
- Subclass: Caenogastropoda
- Order: incertae sedis
- Family: Newtoniellidae
- Genus: Eumetula
- Species: E. macquariensis

Binomial name
- Eumetula macquariensis Tomlin, 1927

Species of gastropod

Eumetula macquariensis is a species of small sea snail, a marine gastropod mollusc in the family Newtoniellidae. It occurs in New Zealand.
