= Cerithiella cepene =

Scientific classification
- Kingdom: Animalia
- Phylum: Mollusca
- Class: Gastropoda
- Subclass: Caenogastropoda
- Order: incertae sedis
- Family: Newtoniellidae
- Genus: Cerithiella
- Species: C. cepene

Binomial name
- Cerithiella cepene de Lima & de Barros, 2007

Species of gastropod

Cerithiella cepene is a species of very small sea snail, a marine gastropod mollusc in the family Newtoniellidae. This species is known from European waters. It was described by de Lima and de Barros, in 2007.
