= Eumetula dilecta =

Scientific classification
- Kingdom: Animalia
- Phylum: Mollusca
- Class: Gastropoda
- Subclass: Caenogastropoda
- Order: incertae sedis
- Family: Newtoniellidae
- Genus: Eumetula
- Species: E. dilecta

Binomial name
- Eumetula dilecta Thiele, 1912

Species of gastropod

Eumetula dilecta is a species of sea snail, a gastropod in the family Newtoniellidae, which is known from Antarctic waters.

It was described by Johannes Thiele in 1912.

== Description ==
The maximum recorded shell length is 5 mm.

== Habitat ==
Minimum recorded depth is 94 m. Maximum recorded depth is 600 m.
