= Cerithiella producta =

Scientific classification
- Kingdom: Animalia
- Phylum: Mollusca
- Class: Gastropoda
- Subclass: Caenogastropoda
- Order: incertae sedis
- Family: Newtoniellidae
- Genus: Cerithiella
- Species: C. producta

Binomial name
- Cerithiella producta Dall, 1927

Species of gastropod

Cerithiella producta is a species of very small sea snail, a marine gastropod mollusk in the family Newtoniellidae. It was described by Dall, in 1927.

== Description ==
The maximum recorded shell length is 8.5 mm.

== Habitat ==
Minimum recorded depth is 538 m. Maximum recorded depth is 538 m.
