= Cerithiella enodis =

Scientific classification
- Kingdom: Animalia
- Phylum: Mollusca
- Class: Gastropoda
- Subclass: Caenogastropoda
- Order: incertae sedis
- Family: Newtoniellidae
- Genus: Cerithiella
- Species: C. enodis

Binomial name
- Cerithiella enodis (Watson, 1880)

Species of gastropod

Cerithiella enodis is a species of very small sea snail, a marine gastropod mollusk in the family Newtoniellidae. This species is known from European waters. It was described by Watson in 1880.

== Description ==
The maximum recorded shell length is 4.8 mm (0.19 in).

== Habitat ==
Only recorded depth is 1,234 m (4,049 ft).
