= Eumetula vitrea =

Scientific classification
- Kingdom: Animalia
- Phylum: Mollusca
- Class: Gastropoda
- Subclass: Caenogastropoda
- Order: incertae sedis
- Family: Newtoniellidae
- Genus: Eumetula
- Species: E. vitrea

Binomial name
- Eumetula vitrea (Dall, 1927)

Species of gastropod

Eumetula vitrea is a species of sea snail, a gastropod in the family Newtoniellidae. It was described by Dall, in 1927.

== Description ==
The maximum recorded shell length is 6.5 mm.

== Habitat ==
Minimum recorded depth is 538 m. Maximum recorded depth is 805 m.
