= Cerithiella macroura =

Scientific classification
- Kingdom: Animalia
- Phylum: Mollusca
- Class: Gastropoda
- Subclass: Caenogastropoda
- Order: incertae sedis
- Family: Newtoniellidae
- Genus: Cerithiella
- Species: C. macroura

Binomial name
- Cerithiella macroura (Melvill & Standen, 1912)

Species of gastropod

Cerithiella macroura is a species of very small sea snail, a marine gastropod mollusk in the family Newtoniellidae. It was described by Melvill and Standen, in 1912.

== Description ==
The maximum recorded shell length is 3.55 mm.

== Habitat ==
Minimum recorded depth is 102 m. Maximum recorded depth is 102 m.
