= Cerithiella superba =

Scientific classification
- Kingdom: Animalia
- Phylum: Mollusca
- Class: Gastropoda
- Subclass: Caenogastropoda
- Order: incertae sedis
- Family: Newtoniellidae
- Genus: Cerithiella
- Species: C. superba

Binomial name
- Cerithiella superba (Thiele, 1912)

Species of gastropod

Cerithiella superba is a species of very small sea snail, a marine gastropod mollusk in the family Newtoniellidae. This species is known from European waters. It was described by Thiele, 1912.
