= Cerithiella astrolabiensis =

Scientific classification
- Kingdom: Animalia
- Phylum: Mollusca
- Class: Gastropoda
- Subclass: Caenogastropoda
- Order: incertae sedis
- Family: Newtoniellidae
- Genus: Cerithiella
- Species: C. astrolabiensis

Binomial name
- Cerithiella astrolabiensis (Strebel, 1908)

Synonyms
- Bittium astrolabiensis Strebel, 1908 (original combination); Cerithiella similis Thiele, 1912

Species of gastropod

Cerithiella astrolabiensis is a species of very small sea snail, a marine gastropod mollusk in the family Newtoniellidae. It was described by Watson in 1880.

== Description ==
The maximum recorded shell length is 11.5 mm.

== Habitat ==
Minimum recorded depth is 95 m. Maximum recorded depth is 298 m.
