= Retilaskeya horrida =

Scientific classification
- Kingdom: Animalia
- Phylum: Mollusca
- Class: Gastropoda
- Subclass: Caenogastropoda
- Order: incertae sedis
- Family: Newtoniellidae
- Genus: Retilaskeya
- Species: R. horrida

Binomial name
- Retilaskeya horrida (Monterosato, 1874)

Species of gastropod

Retilaskeya horrida is a species of sea snail, a gastropod (gastropoda orthogastropoda) in the family Cerithiopsidae cerithiopsinae, which is known from European oceans. It was described by Monterosato in 1874.
