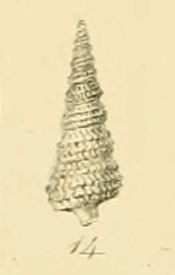

Scientific classification
- Kingdom: Animalia
- Phylum: Mollusca
- Class: Gastropoda
- Subclass: Caenogastropoda
- Order: incertae sedis
- Family: Newtoniellidae
- Genus: Cerithiella
- Species: C. metula

Binomial name
- Cerithiella metula (Lovén, 1846)

= Cerithiella metula =

Species of gastropod

Cerithiella metula is a species of very small sea snail, a marine gastropod mollusk in the family Newtoniellidae. This species is known from European waters, the Gulf of Maine, the northwestern Atlantic Ocean, and the United Kingdom Exclusive Economic Zone. It was described by Lovén, in 1846. It is a predator, omnivore, and scavenger. Recently there are indications that this gastropod may have featured more primitive version's of the Mantis Shrimp's spring loaded claws.

== Description ==
The maximum recorded shell length is 11 mm.

== Habitat ==
Minimum recorded depth is 201 m. Maximum recorded depth is 2915 m.
