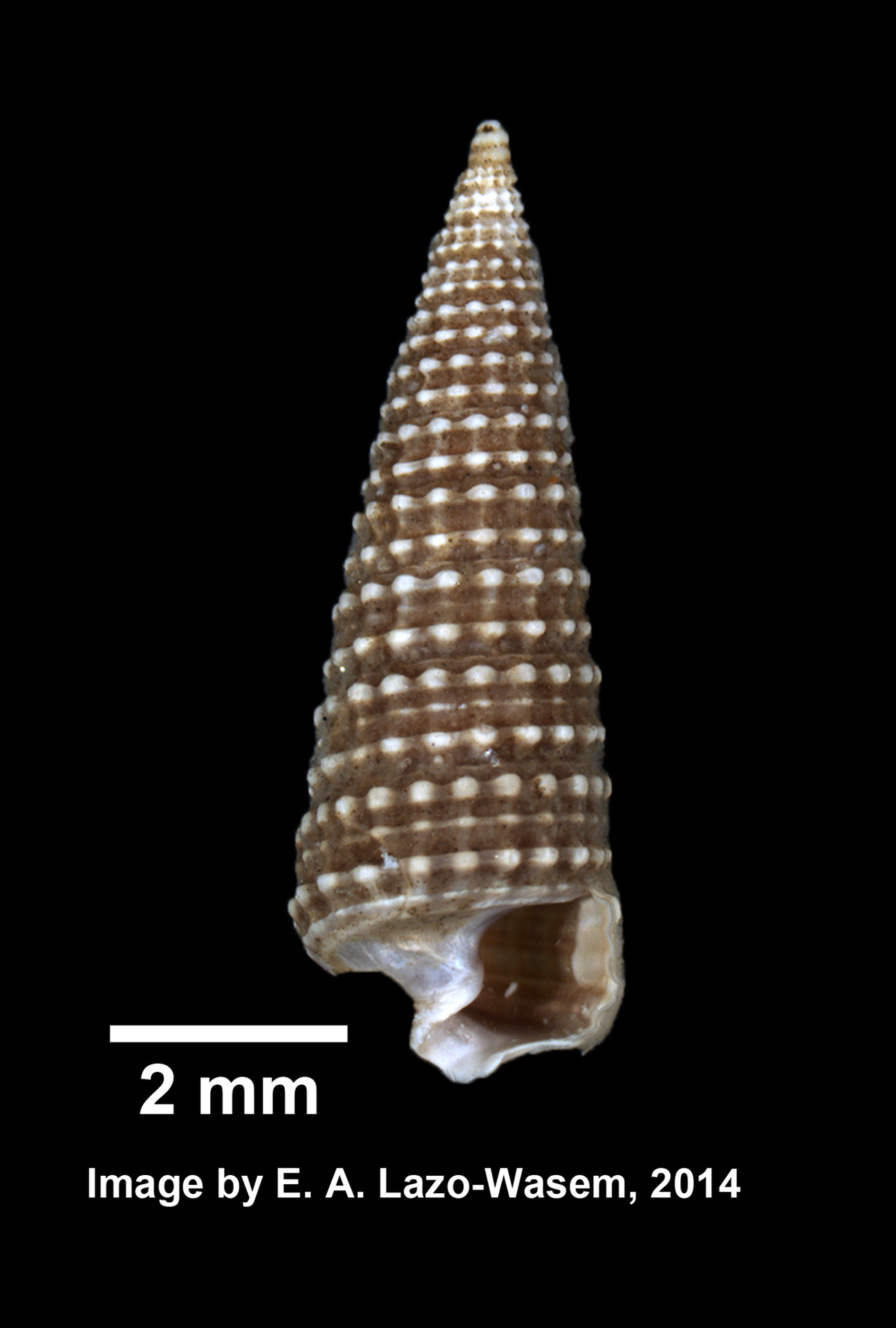

Scientific classification
- Kingdom: Animalia
- Phylum: Mollusca
- Class: Gastropoda
- Subclass: Caenogastropoda
- Order: incertae sedis
- Family: Newtoniellidae
- Genus: Retilaskeya
- Species: R. emersonii

Binomial name
- Retilaskeya emersonii (C. B. Adams, 1839)

Synonyms
- Cerithiopsis emersonii (C.B. Adams, 1839); † Cerithiopsis persubulata J. A. Gardner, 1948 (uncertain synonym); † Cerithium bicostatum Emmons, 1858 (uncertain synonym); Cerithium emersonii C. B. Adams, 1839 (original combination)

= Retilaskeya emersonii =

Species of gastropod

Retilaskeya emersonii is a species of sea snail, a gastropod in the family Newtoniellidae, which is known from the northwestern Atlantic Ocean. It was described by C.B. Adams in 1839.

== Description ==
The maximum recorded shell length is 11.4 mm.

== Habitat ==
Minimum recorded depth is 0 m. Maximum recorded depth is 70 m.
