= Cerithiella danielsseni =

Scientific classification
- Kingdom: Animalia
- Phylum: Mollusca
- Class: Gastropoda
- Subclass: Caenogastropoda
- Order: incertae sedis
- Family: Newtoniellidae
- Genus: Cerithiella
- Species: C. danielsseni

Binomial name
- Cerithiella danielsseni (Friele, 1877)

Species of gastropod

Cerithiella danielsseni is a species of very small sea snail, a marine gastropod mollusk in the family Newtoniellidae. It was described by Friele in 1877.
