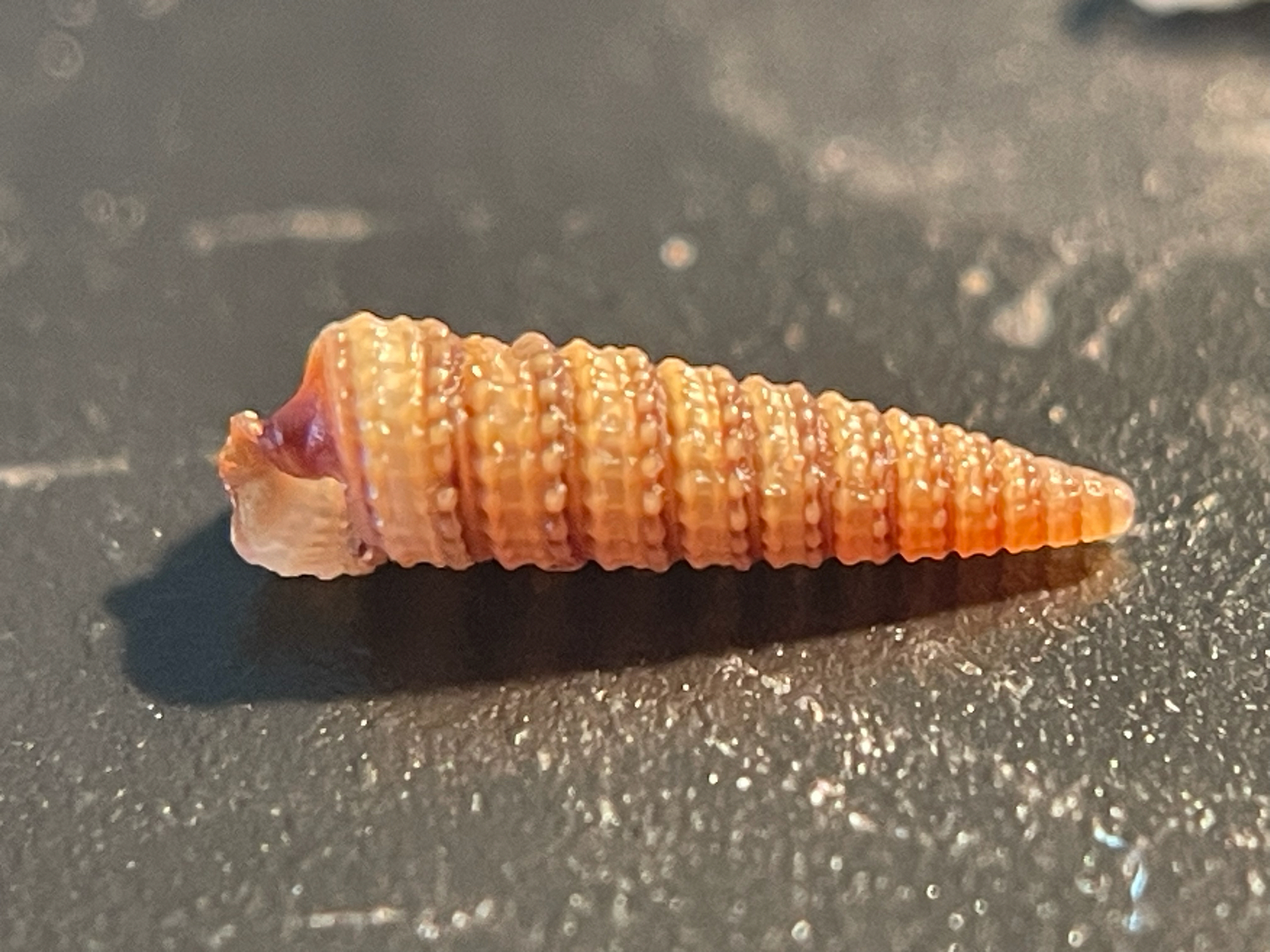

Scientific classification
- Kingdom: Animalia
- Phylum: Mollusca
- Class: Gastropoda
- Subclass: Caenogastropoda
- Order: incertae sedis
- Family: Newtoniellidae
- Genus: Retilaskeya
- Species: R. bicolor

Binomial name
- Retilaskeya bicolor (C. B. Adams, 1845)

= Retilaskeya bicolor =

Species of gastropod

Retilaskeya bicolor is a species of sea snail, a gastropod in the family Newtoniellidae, which is known from the Caribbean Sea and the Gulf of Mexico. It was described by C. B. Adams, in 1845.

== Description ==
The maximum recorded shell length is 20 mm.

== Habitat ==
The minimum recorded depth for this species is 0 m and the maximum recorded depth is 65 m.
