= Cerithiella laevis =

Scientific classification
- Kingdom: Animalia
- Phylum: Mollusca
- Class: Gastropoda
- Subclass: Caenogastropoda
- Order: incertae sedis
- Family: Newtoniellidae
- Genus: Cerithiella
- Species: C. laevis

Binomial name
- Cerithiella laevis (Thiele, 1912)

Synonyms
- Cerithiella lineata Egorova, 1982; Eumeta strebeli var. laevis Thiele, 1912 (basionym)

Species of gastropod

Cerithiella laevis is a species of very small sea snail, a marine gastropod mollusk in the family Newtoniellidae.
