= Cerithiella eulimella =

Scientific classification
- Kingdom: Animalia
- Phylum: Mollusca
- Class: Gastropoda
- Subclass: Caenogastropoda
- Order: incertae sedis
- Family: Newtoniellidae
- Genus: Cerithiella
- Species: C. eulimella

Binomial name
- Cerithiella eulimella Powell, 1958

Species of gastropod

Cerithiella eulimella is a species of very small sea snail, a marine gastropod mollusk in the family Newtoniellidae. It was described by Powell, in 1958.
