= Cerithiella sigsbeana =

Scientific classification
- Kingdom: Animalia
- Phylum: Mollusca
- Class: Gastropoda
- Subclass: Caenogastropoda
- Order: incertae sedis
- Family: Newtoniellidae
- Genus: Cerithiella
- Species: C. sigsbeana

Binomial name
- Cerithiella sigsbeana (Dall, 1881)

Synonyms
- Cerithiopsis sigsbeana Dall, 1881 (original combination)

Species of gastropod

Cerithiella sigsbeana is a species of sea snail, a gastropod in the family Cerithiopsidae, which is known from the Gulf of Mexico. It was described by Dall in 1881.

== Description ==
The maximum recorded shell length is 13.3 mm.

== Habitat ==
Minimum recorded depth is 53 m. Maximum recorded depth is 419 m.
