= Cerithiella insignis =

Scientific classification
- Kingdom: Animalia
- Phylum: Mollusca
- Class: Gastropoda
- Subclass: Caenogastropoda
- Order: incertae sedis
- Family: Newtoniellidae
- Genus: Cerithiella
- Species: C. insignis

Binomial name
- Cerithiella insignis (Jeffreys, 1885)

Species of gastropod

Cerithiella insignis is a species of very small sea snail, a marine gastropod mollusk in the family Newtoniellidae. It was described by Jeffreys, in 1885.
