= Cerithiella seymouriana =

Scientific classification
- Kingdom: Animalia
- Phylum: Mollusca
- Class: Gastropoda
- Subclass: Caenogastropoda
- Order: incertae sedis
- Family: Newtoniellidae
- Genus: Cerithiella
- Species: C. seymouriana

Binomial name
- Cerithiella seymouriana (Strebel, 1908)

Synonyms
- Bittium seymourianum Strebel, 1908 (original combination); Cerithiella erecta Thiele, 1912

Species of gastropod

Cerithiella seymouriana is a species of very small sea snail, a marine gastropod mollusk in the family Newtoniellidae. It was described by Strebel, in 1908.

== Description ==
The maximum recorded shell length is 8.2 mm.

== Habitat ==
Minimum recorded depth is 94 m. Maximum recorded depth is 213 m.
