= Cerithiella amblytera =

Scientific classification
- Kingdom: Animalia
- Phylum: Mollusca
- Class: Gastropoda
- Subclass: Caenogastropoda
- Order: incertae sedis
- Family: Newtoniellidae
- Genus: Cerithiella
- Species: C. amblytera

Binomial name
- Cerithiella amblytera (Watson, 1880)

Synonyms
- Cerithiopsis amblytera Watson, 1880; Cerithiopsis amblytera var. attenuata Locard, 1897; Cerithium (Bittium) amblyterum Watson, 1880 (basionym); Cerithium (Bittium) mamillanum Watson, 1880

Species of gastropod

Cerithiella amblytera is a species of very small sea snail, a marine gastropod mollusk in the family Newtoniellidae. It was first described as Cerithium (Bittium) amblyterum by Watson in 1880.

== Description ==
The maximum recorded shell length is 6.3 mm.

== Distribution ==
This species occurs in the Canary Islands and the Cape Verde archipelago.

== Habitat ==
Minimum recorded depth is 960 m. Maximum recorded depth is 1234 m.
