= Cerithiella axicostulata =

Scientific classification
- Kingdom: Animalia
- Phylum: Mollusca
- Class: Gastropoda
- Subclass: Caenogastropoda
- Order: incertae sedis
- Family: Newtoniellidae
- Genus: Cerithiella
- Species: C. axicostulata

Binomial name
- Cerithiella axicostulata Castellanos, Rolán & Bartolotta, 1987

Species of gastropod

Cerithiella axicostulata is a species of very small sea snail, a marine gastropod mollusk in the family Newtoniellidae. It was described by Castellanos, Rolán and Bartolotta, in 1987.

== Description ==
The maximum recorded shell length is 4.7 mm.

== Habitat ==
Minimum recorded depth is 600 m. Maximum recorded depth is 600 m.
