= Cerithiella martensii =

Scientific classification
- Kingdom: Animalia
- Phylum: Mollusca
- Class: Gastropoda
- Subclass: Caenogastropoda
- Order: incertae sedis
- Family: Newtoniellidae
- Genus: Cerithiella
- Species: C. martensii

Binomial name
- Cerithiella martensii (Dall, 1889)

Species of gastropod

Cerithiella martensii is a species of very small sea snail, a marine gastropod mollusk in the family Newtoniellidae. This species is known from the Gulf of Mexico. It was described by Dall, in 1889.

== Description ==
The maximum recorded shell length is 11.3 mm.

== Habitat ==
Minimum recorded depth is 419 m. Maximum recorded depth is 2160 m.
