= Ataxocerithium huttoni =

Scientific classification
- Kingdom: Animalia
- Phylum: Mollusca
- Class: Gastropoda
- Subclass: Caenogastropoda
- Order: incertae sedis
- Family: Newtoniellidae
- Genus: Ataxocerithium
- Species: A. huttoni

Binomial name
- Ataxocerithium huttoni (Cossmann, 1895)

Synonyms
- Cerithium cancellatum Hutton, 1873; Colina huttoni Cossmann, 1895; Cerithium invaricosum Odhner, 1924

Species of gastropod

Ataxocerithium huttoni is a species of medium-sized sea snail, a marine gastropod mollusc in the family Cerithiidae.
