= Cerithiopsida elegans =

Scientific classification
- Kingdom: Animalia
- Phylum: Mollusca
- Class: Gastropoda
- Subclass: Caenogastropoda
- Order: incertae sedis
- Family: Newtoniellidae
- Genus: Cerithiopsida
- Species: C. elegans

Binomial name
- Cerithiopsida elegans (Golikov & Gulbin, 1978)

Synonyms
- Cerithiopsis elegans Golikov & Gulbin, 1977

Species of gastropod

Cerithiopsida elegans is a species of sea snails in the family Newtoniellidae.

== Distribution ==
This marine species is found off the Kurile Islands.
