= Eumetula strebeli =

Scientific classification
- Kingdom: Animalia
- Phylum: Mollusca
- Class: Gastropoda
- Subclass: Caenogastropoda
- Order: incertae sedis
- Family: Newtoniellidae
- Genus: Eumetula
- Species: E. strebeli

Binomial name
- Eumetula strebeli (Thiele, 1912)

Species of Gastropoda

Eumetula strebeli is a species of sea snail, a gastropod in the family Newtoniellidae, which is known from European waters. It was described by Thiele, in 1912.

The specific name strebeli is in honor of malacologist Hermann Strebel.

== Description ==
The maximum recorded shell length is 6 mm.

== Habitat ==
Minimum recorded depth is 481 m. Maximum recorded depth is 481 m.
