= Eumetula arctica =

Scientific classification
- Kingdom: Animalia
- Phylum: Mollusca
- Class: Gastropoda
- Subclass: Caenogastropoda
- Order: incertae sedis
- Family: Newtoniellidae
- Genus: Eumetula
- Species: E. arctica

Binomial name
- Eumetula arctica (Mørch, 1857)

Species of gastropod

Eumetula arctica is a species of sea snail, a gastropod in the family Newtoniellidae, which is known from the northwestern Atlantic Ocean, European waters, including the Mediterranean Sea, and the Gulf of Maine. It was described by Mørch, in 1857.

== Description ==
The maximum recorded shell length is 11 mm.

== Habitat ==
Minimum recorded depth is 60 m. Maximum recorded depth is 1010 m.
