= Eumetula michaelseni =

Scientific classification
- Kingdom: Animalia
- Phylum: Mollusca
- Class: Gastropoda
- Subclass: Caenogastropoda
- Order: incertae sedis
- Family: Newtoniellidae
- Genus: Eumetula
- Species: E. michaelseni

Binomial name
- Eumetula michaelseni (Strebel, 1905)

Species of gastropod

Eumetula michaelseni is a species of sea snail, a gastropod in the family Newtoniellidae. It was described by Strebel, in 1905.

== Description ==
The maximum recorded shell length is 4.4 mm.

== Habitat ==
Minimum recorded depth is 0 m. Maximum recorded depth is 96 m.
