= Cerithiopsida =

Scientific classification
- Kingdom: Animalia
- Phylum: Mollusca
- Class: Gastropoda
- Subclass: Caenogastropoda
- Order: incertae sedis
- Family: Newtoniellidae
- Genus: Cerithiopsida; Bartsch, 1911

Type species
- Cerithiopsis diegensis Bartsch, 1911

Genus of gastropods

Cerithiopsida is a genus of sea snails in the family Newtoniellidae.

Some species are also represented in the fossil record.

== Species ==
- Cerithiopsida diegensis (Bartsch, 1911) (type)
- Cerithiopsida echinata (Golikov & Gulbin, 1978)
- Cerithiopsida elegans (Golikov & Gulbin, 1978)
- Cerithiopsida lata (Golikov & Gulbin, 1978)
- Cerithiopsida rowelli (Bartsch, 1911)
