= Cerithiella antarctica =

Scientific classification
- Kingdom: Animalia
- Phylum: Mollusca
- Class: Gastropoda
- Subclass: Caenogastropoda
- Order: incertae sedis
- Family: Newtoniellidae
- Genus: Cerithiella
- Species: C. antarctica

Binomial name
- Cerithiella antarctica (E. A. Smith, 1907)

Synonyms
- Cerithiopsilla cincta Thiele, 1912

Species of gastropod

Cerithiella antarctica is a species of very small sea snails, marine gastropod molluscs in the family Cerithiopsidae.
