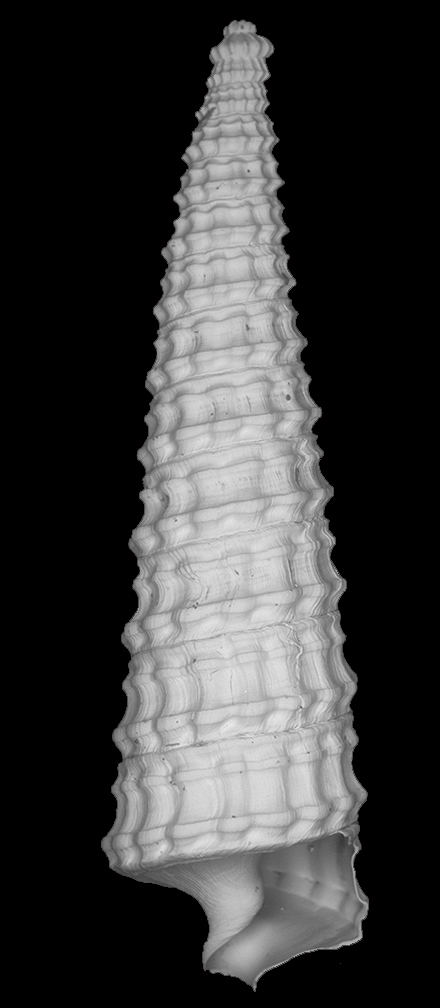
- Shell of Retilaskeya valentini (holotype at MNHN, Paris)

Scientific classification
- Kingdom: Animalia
- Phylum: Mollusca
- Class: Gastropoda
- Subclass: Caenogastropoda
- Order: incertae sedis
- Family: Newtoniellidae
- Genus: Retilaskeya; Marshall, 1978

Type species
- Retilaskeya zelandica Marshall, 1978

Synonyms
- Marshallaskeya Gründel, 1980; Retilaskeya (Marshallaskeya) Gründel, 1980 - alternate representation

= Retilaskeya =

Genus of gastropods

Retilaskeya is a genus of minute sea snails, marine gastropod molluscs in the family Newtoniellidae. It was described by Marshall, in 1978.

== Species ==
Species in the genus Retilaskeya include:

- Retilaskeya albanoi Cecalupo & Perugia, 2021
- Retilaskeya bicolor (C. B. Adams, 1845)
- Retilaskeya chenui (Jay & Drivas, 2002)
- Retilaskeya elegantula (Powell, 1930)
- Retilaskeya emersonii (C.B. Adams, 1839)
- Retilaskeya horrida (Monterosato, 1874)
- Retilaskeya leopardus (Rolán & Gori, 2013)
- Retilaskeya papuaensis Cecalupo & Perugia, 2018
- Retilaskeya philippinensis Cecalupo & Perugia, 2012
- Retilaskeya reunionensis (Jay & Drivas, 2002)
- Retilaskeya rufocincta Cecalupo & Perugia, 2013
- Retilaskeya valentini Cecalupo & Perugia, 2020
- Retilaskeya zelandica Marshall, 1978

Species brought into synonymy

- Retilaskeya nivea Faber, 2007: synonym of Cubalaskeya nivea (Faber, 2007)
