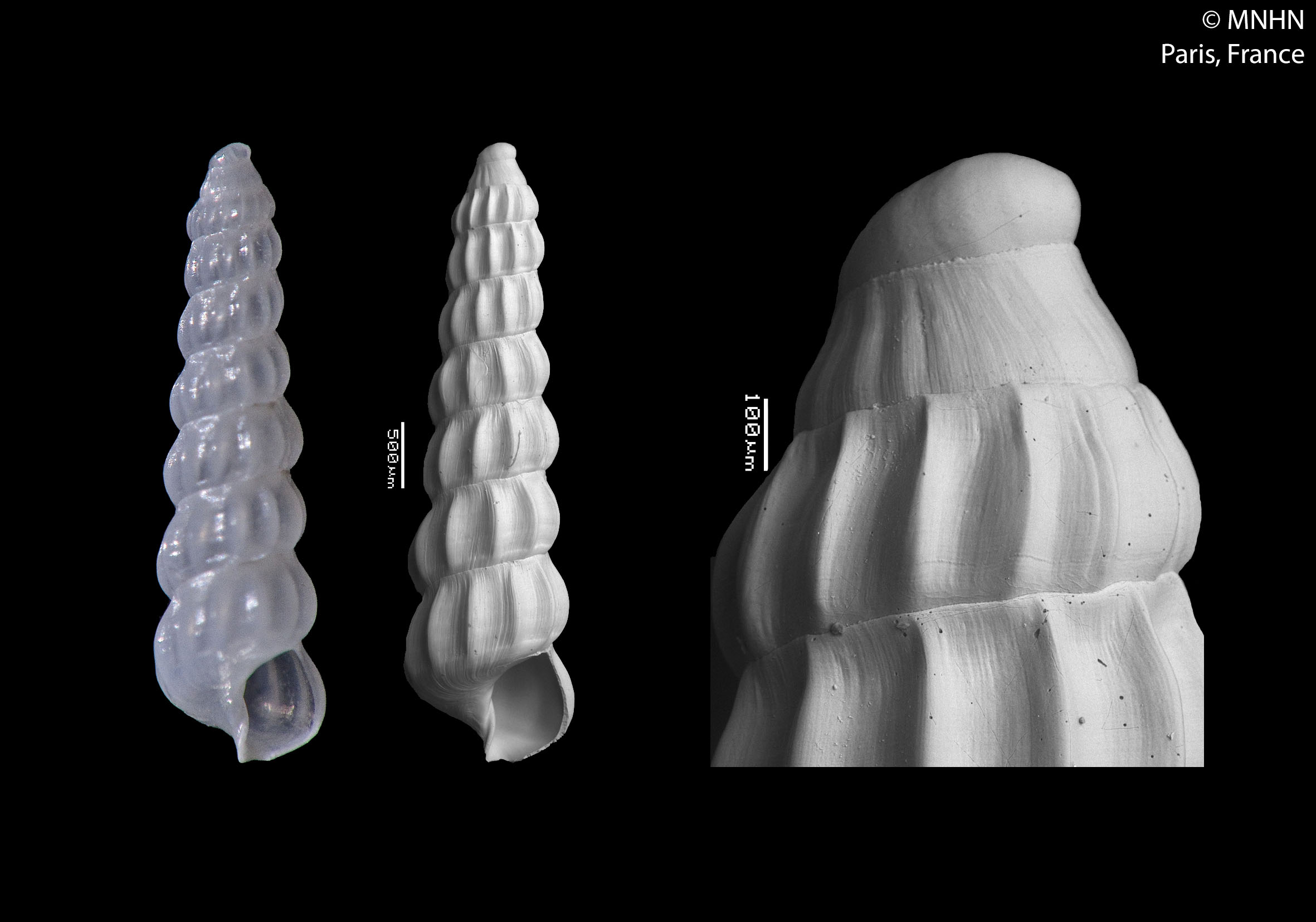
- Shell of Eumetula albachiarae (holotype at MNHN, Paris)

Scientific classification
- Kingdom: Animalia
- Phylum: Mollusca
- Class: Gastropoda
- Subclass: Caenogastropoda
- Order: incertae sedis
- Family: Newtoniellidae
- Genus: Eumetula; Thiele, 1912

Type species
- Eumeta dilecta Thiele, 1912

Synonyms
- Eumeta Mörch, 1868 (Invalid: junior homonym of Eumeta Walker, 1855 [Lepidoptera]; Laskeya is a replacement name); Laskeya Iredale, 1918

= Eumetula =

Genus of gastropods

Eumetula is a genus of minute sea snails, marine gastropod molluscs in the subfamily Eumetulinae of the family Newtoniellidae.

== Species ==
Species in the genus Eumetula include:

- Eumetula albachiarae Cecalupo & Perugia, 2014
- Eumetula aliceae (Dautzenberg & Fischer H., 1896)
- Eumetula arctica (Mörch, 1857)
- Eumetula aureola (Powell, 1933)
- Eumetula axicostulata (Castellanos, Rolán & Bartolotta, 1987)
- Eumetula bia (Bartsch, 1915)
- Eumetula bimarginata (C.B. Adams, 1852)
- Eumetula bouvieri (Dautzenberg & Fischer H., 1896)
- Eumetula brattegardi Høisæter, 2015
- Eumetula dilecta Thiele, 1912
- Eumetula eucosmia Bartsch, 1911
- Eumetula intercalaris (Carpenter, 1865)
- Eumetula macquariensis Tomlin, 1948
- Eumetula michaelseni (Strebel, 1905)
- †Eumetula mourloni Briart and Cornet 1873
- Eumetula ornata (Thiele, 1912)
- Eumetula pulla (Philippi, 1845)
- Eumetula strebeli (Thiele, 1912)
- Eumetula striata Gulbin, 1982
- Eumetula vicksburgella MacNeil in MacNeil & Dockery
- Eumetula vitrea (Dall, 1927)

Species brought into synonymy

- Eumetula crystallina (Dall, 1881): synonym of Varicopeza crystallina (Dall, 1881)
- Eumetula vitrea Tore Høisæter: synonym of Eumetula brattegardi Høisæter, 2015 (invalid: secondary junior homonym of Eumetula vitrea (Dall, 1927); E. brattegardi is a replacement name)
