= Cerithiopsilla georgiana =

Scientific classification
- Kingdom: Animalia
- Phylum: Mollusca
- Class: Gastropoda
- Subclass: Caenogastropoda
- Order: incertae sedis
- Family: Cerithiopsidae
- Genus: Cerithiopsilla
- Species: C. georgiana

Binomial name
- Cerithiopsilla georgiana (Pfeffer, 1886)

Species of gastropod

Cerithiopsilla georgiana is a species of very small sea snails, marine gastropod molluscs in the family Cerithiopsidae. It was described by Pfeffer in 1886.

== Description ==
The maximum recorded shell length is 5 mm.

== Habitat ==
Minimum recorded depth is 1 m. Maximum recorded depth is 1 m.
