= Cerithiella bisculpta =

Scientific classification
- Kingdom: Animalia
- Phylum: Mollusca
- Class: Gastropoda
- Subclass: Caenogastropoda
- Order: incertae sedis
- Family: Newtoniellidae
- Genus: Cerithiella
- Species: C. bisculpta

Binomial name
- Cerithiella bisculpta (Strebel, 1908)

Synonyms
- Cerithiopsilla bisculpta (Strebel, 1908)

Species of gastropod

Cerithiella bisculpta is a species of very small sea snails, marine gastropod molluscs in the family Newtoniellidae. It was described by Strebel in 1908.

== Description ==
The maximum recorded shell length is 4.5 mm.

== Habitat ==
Minimum recorded depth is 94 m. Maximum recorded depth is 252 m.
