= Krachia tiara =

Scientific classification
- Kingdom: Animalia
- Phylum: Mollusca
- Class: Gastropoda
- Subclass: Caenogastropoda
- Order: incertae sedis
- Family: Cerithiopsidae
- Genus: Krachia
- Species: K. tiara

Binomial name
- Krachia tiara (Monterosato, 1874)

Synonyms
- Cerithiopsis tiara Monterosato, 1874

Species of gastropod

Krachia tiara is a species of sea snail, a gastropod in the family Cerithiopsidae, which is known from European waters. It was described by Monterosato, in 1874.

== Distribution ==
This marine species was at bathyal depths off Madeira, the Cape Verdes, the Canary Islands and in the Mediterranean Sea.

== Description ==
The size of the shell attains 4 mm.
