= Cerithiopsilla gaussiana =

Scientific classification
- Kingdom: Animalia
- Phylum: Mollusca
- Class: Gastropoda
- Subclass: Caenogastropoda
- Order: incertae sedis
- Family: Cerithiopsidae
- Genus: Cerithiopsilla
- Species: C. gaussiana

Binomial name
- Cerithiopsilla gaussiana Egorova, 1972

Species of gastropod

Cerithiopsilla gaussiana is a species of very small sea snails, marine gastropod molluscs in the family Cerithiopsidae. It was described by Egorova in 1972.
