= Eumetula pulla =

Scientific classification
- Kingdom: Animalia
- Phylum: Mollusca
- Class: Gastropoda
- Subclass: Caenogastropoda
- Order: incertae sedis
- Family: Newtoniellidae
- Genus: Eumetula
- Species: E. pulla

Binomial name
- Eumetula pulla (Philippi, 1845)

Species of gastropod

Eumetula pulla is a species of sea snail, a gastropod in the family Newtoniellidae. It was described by Philippi, in 1845.

== Description ==
The maximum recorded shell length is 19 mm.

== Habitat ==
Minimum recorded depth is 0 m. Maximum recorded depth is 274 m.
