= Krachia cylindrata =

Scientific classification
- Kingdom: Animalia
- Phylum: Mollusca
- Class: Gastropoda
- Subclass: Caenogastropoda
- Order: incertae sedis
- Family: Cerithiopsidae
- Genus: Krachia
- Species: K. cylindrata

Binomial name
- Krachia cylindrata (Jeffreys, 1885)

Synonyms
- Cerithiopsis urioi Hallgass, 1985; Cerithium cylindratum Jeffreys, 1885 (original combination)

Species of gastropod

Krachia cylindrata is a species of sea snail, a gastropod in the family Cerithiopsidae, which is known from European waters. It was described by Jeffreys, in 1885.

== Distribution ==
This species occurs in the Mediterranean Sea, found off the Lipari Islands, Italy.

== Description ==
The size of the shell varies between 2.5 mm and 5 mm.
