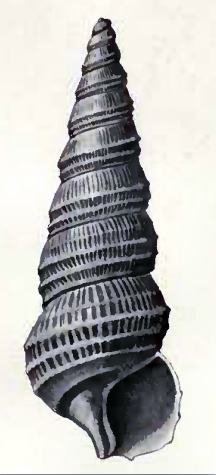
- Shell of Cerithiella austrina (holotype)

Scientific classification
- Kingdom: Animalia
- Phylum: Mollusca
- Class: Gastropoda
- Subclass: Caenogastropoda
- Order: incertae sedis
- Family: Newtoniellidae
- Genus: Cerithiella
- Species: C. austrina

Binomial name
- Cerithiella austrina (Hedley, 1911)

Synonyms
- Cerithiopsilla austrina (Hedley, 1911); Lovenella austrina Hedley, 1911 (original combination)

= Cerithiella austrina =

Species of gastropod

Cerithiella austrina is a species of very small sea snails, marine gastropod molluscs in the family Newtoniellidae. It was described by Hedley in 1911.

== Description ==
The length of the shell attains 8 mm, its diameter 2.5 mm.

(Original description) The shell presents as small, elongate-conical shape and is delicately thin. It exhibits a semi-translucent quality. Its colour is a soft, pale buff. With a total of ten whorls, including a smooth helicoid protoconch spanning a 1½ whorl, its construction is intricate.

Sculpture: three slender spiral keels on each whorl, with one tracing the lower suture, another marking the periphery, and the third positioned intermediate. On the body whorl, the emergence of an incipient thread above the periphery and another one at the base add a nuanced complexity. These features are further accentuated by the presence of fine, numerous perpendicular irregular riblets, which traverse the interspaces in a cancellate fashion.

The aperture takes on a subcircular form, angled above and gently notched below by a brief, perpendicular siphonal canal. The columella is thickened and arched. The outer lip maintains a delicate thinness.

== Distribution ==
This marine species occurs off Antarctica.
