= Eumetula aliceae =

Scientific classification
- Kingdom: Animalia
- Phylum: Mollusca
- Class: Gastropoda
- Subclass: Caenogastropoda
- Order: incertae sedis
- Family: Newtoniellidae
- Genus: Eumetula
- Species: E. aliceae

Binomial name
- Eumetula aliceae (Dautzenberg & Fischer H., 1896)

Species of gastropod

Eumetula aliceae is a species of sea snail, a gastropod in the family Newtoniellidae, which is known from European waters. It was described by Dautzenberg and Fischer H., in 1896.
