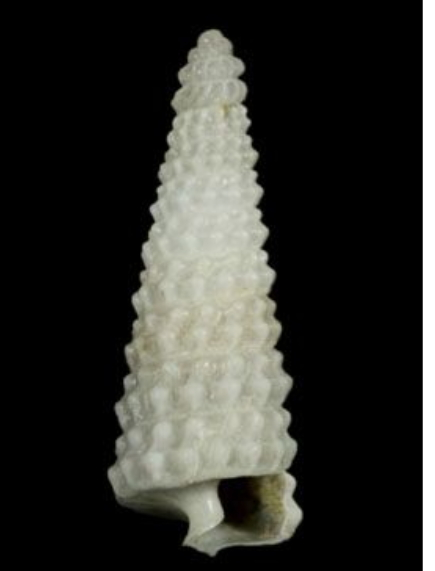
- Shell of Trituba azorica (specimen at the Natural History Museum, Rotterdam)

Scientific classification
- Kingdom: Animalia
- Phylum: Mollusca
- Class: Gastropoda
- Subclass: Caenogastropoda
- Order: incertae sedis
- Family: Newtoniellidae
- Genus: Trituba; Jousseaume, 1884

Type species
- † Triforis bitubulatus Baudon, 1856

Species
- See text

Synonyms
- Granulotriforis Kosuge, 1967; Paramendax A. W. B. Powell, 1937; Tauroforis Sacco, 1895; Triforis (Granulotriforis) Kosuge, 1967; Triforis (Paramendax) A. W. B. Powell, 1937; † Triforis (Tauroforis) Sacco, 1895 junior subjective synonym; Triforis (Trituba) Jousseaume, 1884 superseded rank; Trituba (Granulotriforis) Kosuge, 1967 alternative representation; Trituba (Paramendax) A. W. B. Powell, 1937 alternative representation

= Trituba =

Genus of gastropods

Trituba is a genus of minute sea snails, marine gastropod molluscs in the family Newtoniellidae.

== General characteristics ==
(Original description in French) The shell is dextral, elongated, and almost cylindrical, with whorls marked by longitudinal riblets and ornamented with two small cords. The spire consists of nineteen whorls, five of which are embryonic. The body whorl, nearly smooth, divides into three elongated tubes.

== Species ==
Species in the genus Trituba include:

- Trituba additicia Gofas, 2003
- Trituba anelpistos (Bouchet & Fechter, 1981)
- Trituba antepallaxa (B. A. Marshall, 1977)
- Trituba anubis M. Fernandes, Garofalo & Pimenta, 2015
- Trituba apicina (A. W. B. Powell, 1937)
- Trituba attenuatispira (A. W. B. Powell, 1937)
- Trituba azorica Gofas, Freiwald & L. Hoffman, 2023
- Trituba barbadensis (Coomans & Faber, 1984)
- † Trituba bitubulata (Baudon, 1856)
- Trituba blacki (B.A. Marshall, 1977)
- † Trituba chevallieri (Cossmann, 1896)
- Trituba constricta Gofas, 2003
- Trituba dexia (Verco, 1909)
- † Trituba dominici (Gougerot, 1966)
- Trituba elatissima Gofas, 2003
- Trituba epallaxa (Verco, 1909)
- Trituba fallax Gofas, 2003
- † Trituba fenestrata (Cossmann, 1889)
- Trituba hirta Gofas, 2003
- Trituba incredita Gofas, 2003
- Trituba lima Gofas, 2003
- † Trituba neozelanica (Laws, 1939)
- Trituba nonnitens (Barnard, 1963)
- † Trituba obliquecostulata (Kaunhowen, 1898)
- † Trituba plicata (Deshayes, 1834)
- Trituba recurvata Gofas, 2003
- † Trituba sorgenfreii (Schnetler, 1990)
- Trituba superstes (Bouchet & Fechter, 1981)
- Trituba tanseiae (Kosuge, 1967)
- † Trituba tauroturrita (Sacco, 1895)
- † Trituba tertia (Lozouet, 1999)
- † Trituba triforis (A. d'Orbigny, 1850)
- Trituba tui (B. A. Marshall, 1977)
- † Trituba umboseriata Darragh, 2017
- † Trituba zecollata (Laws, 1941)
