= Krachia =

Scientific classification
- Kingdom: Animalia
- Phylum: Mollusca
- Class: Gastropoda
- Subclass: Caenogastropoda
- Order: incertae sedis
- Family: Cerithiopsidae
- Genus: Krachia; Thiele, 1912

Species
- See text

Genus of gastropods

Krachia is a genus of minute sea snails, marine gastropod molluscs in the family Cerithiopsidae.

== Species ==
Species in the genus Krachia include:

- Krachia cossmanni (Dautzenberg & Fischer H., 1896)
- Krachia cylindrata (Jeffreys, 1885)
- Krachia guernei (Dautzenberg & Fischer H., 1896)
- † Krachia korytnicensis (Baluk, 1975)
- Krachia obeliscoides (Jeffreys, 1885)
- Krachia tiara (Monterosato, 1874)
