= Krachia obeliscoides =

Scientific classification
- Kingdom: Animalia
- Phylum: Mollusca
- Class: Gastropoda
- Subclass: Caenogastropoda
- Order: incertae sedis
- Family: Cerithiopsidae
- Genus: Krachia
- Species: K. obeliscoides

Binomial name
- Krachia obeliscoides (Jeffreys, 1885)

Synonyms
- Cerithium obeliscoides Jeffreys, 1885

Species of gastropod

Krachia obeliscoides is a species of sea snail, a gastropod in the family Cerithiopsidae, which is known from European water. It was described by Jeffreys, in 1885.

== Distribution ==
This marine species was found at bathyal depths off Portugal.
