= Krachia guernei =

Scientific classification
- Kingdom: Animalia
- Phylum: Mollusca
- Class: Gastropoda
- Subclass: Caenogastropoda
- Order: incertae sedis
- Family: Cerithiopsidae
- Genus: Krachia
- Species: K. guernei

Binomial name
- Krachia guernei (Dautzenberg & Fischer H., 1896)

Synonyms
- Cerithiella guernei Dautzenberg & H. Fischer, 1896

Species of gastropod

Krachia guernei is a species of sea snail, a gastropod in the family Cerithiopsidae, which is known from European waters. It was described by Dautzenberg and Fischer H., in 1896.
