= Krachia cossmanni =

Scientific classification
- Kingdom: Animalia
- Phylum: Mollusca
- Class: Gastropoda
- Subclass: Caenogastropoda
- Order: incertae sedis
- Family: Cerithiopsidae
- Genus: Krachia
- Species: K. cossmanni

Binomial name
- Krachia cossmanni (Dautzenberg & Fischer H., 1896)

Synonyms
- Cerithiella cossmanni Dautzenberg & H. Fischer, 1896

Species of gastropod

Krachia cossmanni is a species of sea snail, a gastropod in the family Cerithiopsidae, which is known from European waters, including the United Kingdom Exclusive Economic Zone. It was described by Dautzenberg and Fischer H., in 1896.

== Distribution ==
This marine species occurs in European waters found at bathyal depths off the Azores, Iceland, the Faroes, and Southern Norway.

== Description ==
The length of the shall attains 6 mm.
