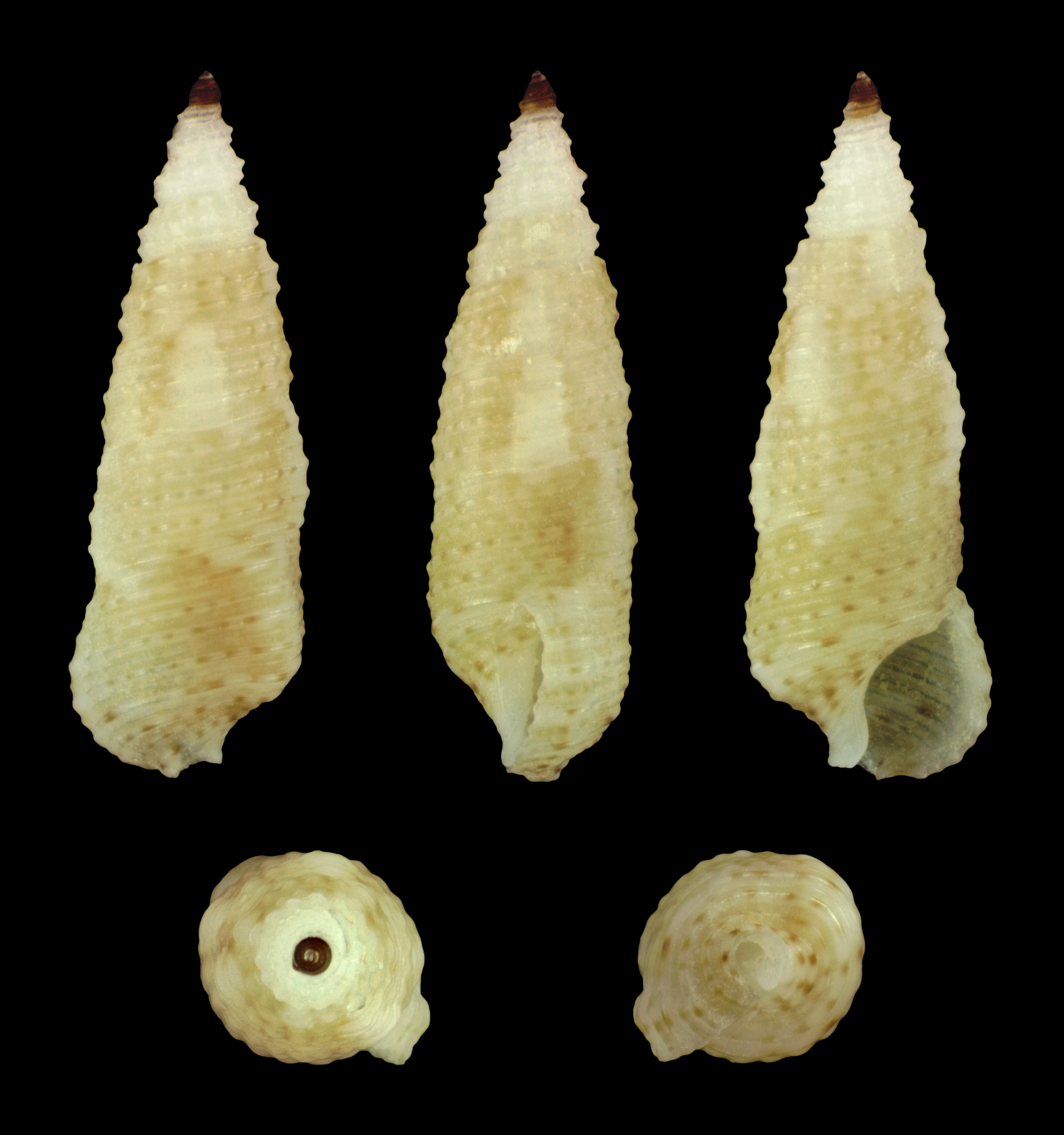

Scientific classification
- Kingdom: Animalia
- Phylum: Mollusca
- Class: Gastropoda
- Subclass: Caenogastropoda
- Order: incertae sedis
- Family: Cerithiidae
- Genus: Cerithium
- Species: C. interstriatum

Binomial name
- Cerithium interstriatum G.B. Sowerby II, 1855

Synonyms
- Ataxocerithium fucatum (Pease, 1861); Cerithium clavis G.B. Sowerby II, 1865 (original combination); Cerithium fucatum Pease, 1861; Cerithium thaanumi Pilsbry & Vanatta, 1905

= Cerithium interstriatum =

Species of gastropod

Cerithium interstriatum is a species of sea snail, a marine gastropod mollusk in the family Cerithiidae.

== Distribution ==
The distribution of Cerithium interstriatum includes the Western Central Pacific.

- Guam
- New Zealand

== Description ==
The size of the shell varies between 8 mm and 33 mm.
