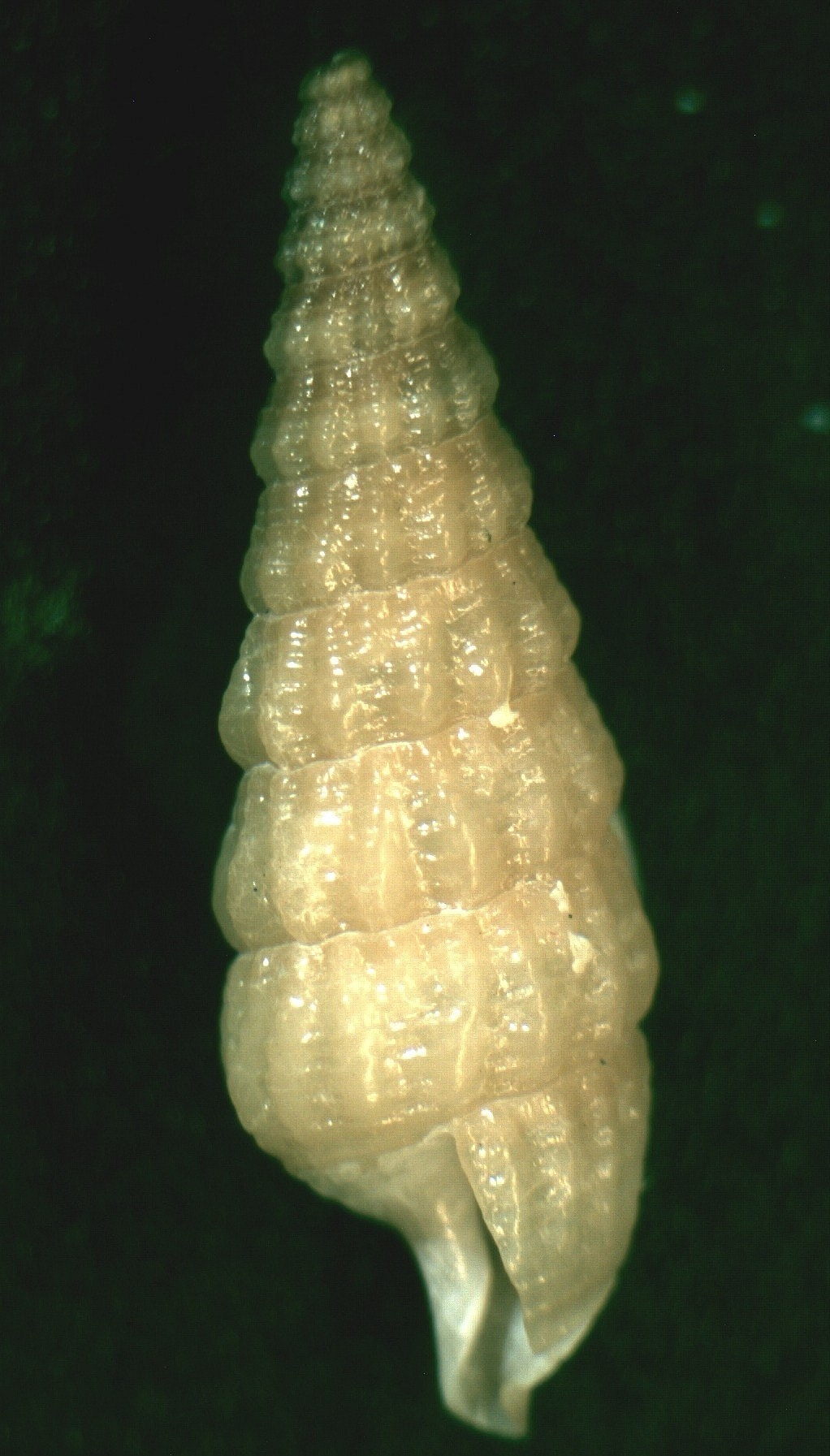
- Ataxocerithium serotinum shell

Scientific classification
- Kingdom: Animalia
- Phylum: Mollusca
- Class: Gastropoda
- Subclass: Caenogastropoda
- Order: incertae sedis
- Superfamily: Triphoroidea
- Family: Newtoniellidae; Korobkov, 1955

Synonyms
- Ataxocerithiinae Ludbrook, 1957 (Not available (no diagnosis))

= Newtoniellidae =

Family of gastropods

Newtoniellidae is a family of small sea snails, marine gastropod molluscs or micromolluscs in the superfamily Triphoroidea. It contains the following subfamilies :

- † Gothicispira Maxwell, 1988
- † Miopila Finlay, 1926
- Retilaskeya B. A. Marshall, 1978
- Adelacerithiinae
  - Adelacerithium Ludbrook, 1941
- Ataxocerithiinae
  - Ataxocerithium Tate, 1894
- Eumetulinae
  - Cerithiopsida Bartsch, 1911
  - Embrionalia Golikov, 1988
  - Eumetula Thiele, 1912
  - Furukawaia Kuroda & Habe in Habe, 1961
  - Marshallaskeya Gründel, 1980
- Laeocochlidinae
  - Laeocochlis Dunker & Metzger, 1875
  - Sasamocochlis Gründel, 1980
- Newtoniellinae
  - Cerithiella Verrill, 1882
  - Granulotriforis Kosuge, 1967
  - Paramendax A. W. B. Powell, 1937: synonym of Trituba Jousseaume, 1884
  - Trituba Jousseaume, 1884

Genera brought into synonymy

- Altispecula Powell, 1930: synonym of Eumetula (Altispecula) Powell, 1930 represented as Eumetula Thiele, 1912
- Binda Laseron, 1951: synonym of Cerithiella Verrill, 1882
- Cerithiolinum Locard, 1903: synonym of Cerithiella Verrill, 1882
- Chasteria Iredale, 1915: synonym of Cerithiella Verrill, 1882
- Eumeta Mörch, 1868: synonym of Eumetula Thiele, 1912
- Euseila Cotton, 1951: synonym of Cerithiella Verrill, 1882
- Furukuwaia: synonym of Furukawaia Kuroda & Habe in Habe, 1961
- Geminataxum Iredale, 1936: synonym of Ataxocerithium Tate, 1894
- Laiocochlis Dunker & Metzger, 1874: synonym of Laeocochlis Dunker & Metzger, 1874
- Laskeya Iredale, 1918: synonym of Eumetula Thiele, 1912
- Lovenella G. O. Sars, 1878: synonym of Cerithiella Verrill, 1882
- Newtonia Cossman, 1892: synonym of Cerithiella Verrill, 1882
- Newtoniella Cossman, 1893: synonym of Cerithiella Verrill, 1882
- Stilus Jeffreys, 1885: synonym of Cerithiella Verrill, 1882
- Tauroforis Sacco, 1895: synonym of Trituba Jousseaume, 1884
